= List of American Civil War Medal of Honor recipients: T–Z =

This is a complete alphabetical list (T to Z) of Medal of Honor recipients during the Civil War. Many of the awards during the Civil War were for capturing or saving regimental flags. These flags served as the rallying point for the unit, and guided the unit's movements. Loss of the flag could greatly disrupt a unit, and could have a greater effect than the death of the commanding officer.

== Medal of Honor ==
The Medal of Honor is the highest military decoration awarded by the United States government and is bestowed on a member of the United States armed forces who distinguishes himself "…conspicuously by gallantry and intrepidity at the risk of his life above and beyond the call of duty while that could engaged in an action against an enemy of the United States…" Due to the nature of this medal, it is commonly presented posthumously.

Recipients are listed alphabetically by last name. Posthumous receipt is denoted by an asterisk.

== T ==
Recipients are listed alphabetically by last name. Posthumous receipt is denoted by an asterisk.

This, along with the *, indicates that the Medal of Honor was awarded posthumously.

Image	Name	Service	Rank	Unit/command	Place of action	Date of action	Notes
	William L. S. Tabor	Army	Private	Company K, 15th New Hampshire Volunteer Infantry Regiment	Port Hudson, Louisiana	Jul 1863	Voluntarily exposed himself to the enemy only a few feet away to render valuable services for the protection of his comrades.
Medal of Honor winner Taggart, Charles A c1899	Charles A. Taggart	Army	Private	Company B, 37th Massachusetts Infantry	Battle of Sayler's Creek, Virginia	Apr 6, 1865	Capture of flag.
—	William Talbott	Navy	Captain of the Forecastle	(United States Navy) USS Louisville	USS Louisville (1861)	Jan 10, 1863 – Jan 11, 1863	Served as captain of the forecastle on board USS Louisville (1861) at the capture of the Arkansas post, 10 and 11 January 1863.
—	James Tallentine*	Navy	Quarter Gunner	(United States Navy) USS Tacony	USS Tacony (1863)	October 31, 1864	Served as quarter gunner on board USS Tacony (1863) during the taking of Plymouth, North Carolina, 31 October 1864.
—	Charles B. Tanner	Army	Second Lieutenant	Company H, 1st Delaware Infantry	Battle of Antietam, Maryland	Sep 17, 1862	Carried off the regimental colors, which had fallen within 20 yards (18 m) of the enemy's lines, the color guard of nine men having all been killed or wounded; was himself 3 times wounded.
	Anthony Taylor	Army	First Lieutenant	Company A, 15th Pennsylvania Cavalry Regiment	Battle of Chickamauga, Georgia	Sep 20, 1863	Held out to the last with a small force against the advance of superior numbers of the enemy.
Head and torso of an older white man with a long flowing beard wearing a jacket with four medals hanging from ribbons pinned to the left breast. The portrait is surrounded by a decorative frame and illustrations of American flags and laurel wreaths.	Forrester L. Taylor	Army	Captain	Company H, 23rd New Jersey Infantry Regiment	Battle of Chancellorsville, Virginia	May 3, 1863	23rd NJ Vol. Infantry
—	George Taylor	Navy	Armorer	(United States Navy) USS Lackawanna	USS Lackawanna (1862) Fort Morgan, Battle of Mobile Bay, Alabama	Aug 5, 1864	On board USS Lackawanna (1862) during successful attacks against Fort Morgan, rebel gunboats and the ram Tennessee in Mobile Bay, on 5 August 1864.
Medal of Honor winner Taylor, Henry Harrison c1899	Henry H. Taylor	Army	Sergeant	Company C, 45th Illinois Infantry	Battle of Vicksburg, Mississippi	Jun 25, 1863	Was the first to plant the Union colors upon the enemy's works.
	Joseph Taylor	Army	Private	Company E, 7th Rhode Island Infantry Regiment	Battle of Globe Tavern, Virginia	Aug 18, 1864	While acting as an orderly to a general officer on the field and alone, encountered a picket of three of the enemy and compelled their surrender.
Medal of Honor winner Taylor, Richard (1833–1890) c1899	Richard Taylor	Army	Private	Company E, 18th Indiana Infantry Regiment	Battle of Cedar Creek, Virginia	Oct 19, 1864	Capture of flag.
—	Thomas Taylor	Navy	Coxswain	(United States Navy) USS Metacomet	USS MetacometFort Morgan, Battle of Mobile Bay, Alabama	Aug 5, 1864	Served on board the USS Metacomet during the action against rebel forts and gunboats and with the rebel ram Tennessee in Mobile Bay, 5 August 1864. Despite damage to his ship and the loss of several men on board as enemy fire raked her decks, Taylor encouraged the men of the forward pivot gun when the officer in command displayed cowardice, doing honor to the occasion.
Medal of Honor winner Taylor, William (1836–1902) c1865	William Taylor	Army	Sergeant	Company H, 1st Maryland Infantry Regiment	Battle of Front Royal, Virginia and Battle of Globe Tavern, Virginia	May 23, 1862 and Aug 19, 1864	When a sergeant, at Front Royal, Virginia, he was wounded while obeying an order to burn a bridge, but, persevering in the attempt, he burned the bridge and prevented its use by the enemy. Later, at Weldon Railroad, Virginia, then a lieutenant, he voluntarily took the place of a disabled officer and undertook a hazardous reconnaissance beyond the lines of the army; was taken prisoner in the attempt.
—	William G. Taylor	Navy	Captain of the Forecastle	(United States Navy) USS Ticonderoga	USS TiconderogaFirst Battle of Fort Fisher, North Carolina	Dec 24, 1864 – Dec 25, 1864	On board USS Ticonderoga during attacks on Fort Fisher, 24 and 25 December 1864. As captain of a gun, Taylor performed his duties with coolness and skill as his ship took position in the line of battle and delivered its fire on the batteries on shore. Despite the depressing effect caused when an explosion of the 100-pounder Parrott rifle killed 8 men and wounded 12 more, and the enemy's heavy return fire, he calmly remained at his station during the 2 days' operations.
	John D. Terry	Army	Sergeant	Company E, 23rd Massachusetts Infantry Regiment	New Bern, North Carolina	Mar 14, 1862	In the thickest of the fight, where he lost his leg by a shot, still encouraged the men until carried off the field.
Medal of Honor winner Thackrah, Benjamin (1845–1912) c1899	Benjamin Thackrah	Army	Private	(New York (state)) Company H, 115th New York Infantry	Near Fort Gates, Fla.	Apr 1, 1864	Was a volunteer in the surprise and capture of the enemy's picket.
—	Charles M. Thatcher	Army	Private	Company B, 1st Michigan Volunteer Sharpshooters Regiment	Battle of the Crater, Petersburg, Virginia	Jul 30, 1864	Instead of retreating or surrendering when the works were captured, regardless of his personal safety continued to return the enemy's fire until he was captured.
Medal of Honor winner Thaxter, Sidney Warren (1839–1908) c1899	Sidney W. Thaxter	Army	Major	1st Maine Volunteer Cavalry Regiment	Battle of Boydton Plank Road, Petersburg, Virginia	Oct 27, 1864	Voluntarily remained and participated in the battle with conspicuous gallantry, although his term of service had expired and he had been ordered home to be mustered out.
—	Henry Thielberg	Navy	Seaman	(United States Navy) USS Mount Washington	USS Mount Washington	April 14, 1863	Serving temporarily on board the USS Mount Washington during the Nansemond River action, 14 April 1863. After assisting in hauling up and raising the flagstaff, Thielberg volunteered to go up on the pilothouse and observe the movements of the enemy and although 3 shells struck within a few inches of his head, remained at his post until ordered to descend.
Medal of Honor winner Thomas, Hampton Sidney (1837–1899) c1865	Hampton S. Thomas	Army	Major	1st Pennsylvania Veteran Cavalry Regiment	Amelia Springs, Virginia	Apr 5, 1865	Conspicuous gallantry in the capture of a field battery and a number of battle flags and in the destruction of the enemy's wagon train. Major Thomas lost a leg in this action.
Head of a middle aged white man with a full beard and neatly combed hair, wearing a double-breasted military jacket.	Stephen Thomas	Army	Colonel	8th Vermont Volunteer Infantry Regiment	Battle of Cedar Creek, Virginia	Oct 19, 1864	Distinguished conduct in a desperate hand-to-hand encounter, in which the advance of the enemy was checked.
—	George W. Thompkins	Army	Corporal	(New York (state)) Company F, 125th New York Volunteer Infantry Regiment	Battle of Fort Stedman, Petersburg, Virginia	Mar 25, 1865	Capture of flag of 49th Alabama Infantry (C.S.A.) from an officer who, with colors in hand, was rallying his men.
Head and shoulders of a white man with a long beard, wearing a forage cap and a plain jacket with a star-shaped medal and a long ribbon pinned to the left breast.	Allen Thompson	Army	Private	(New York (state)) Company I, 4th New York Heavy Artillery Regiment	White Oak Road, Virginia	Apr 1, 1865	Made a hazardous reconnaissance through timber and slashings preceding the Union line of battle, signaling the troops and leading them through the obstruction.
Medal of Honor winner Thompson, Charles Augustus (1843–1900) c1865	Charles A. Thompson	Army	Sergeant	Company D, 17th Michigan Infantry	Battle of Spotsylvania Court House, Virginia	May 12, 1864	After the regiment was surrounded and all resistance seemed useless, fought single-handed for the colors and refused to give them up until he had appealed to his superior officers.
—	Freeman C. Thompson	Army	Corporal	Company F, 116th Ohio Infantry	Third Battle of Petersburg, Virginia	Apr 2, 1865	Was twice knocked from the parapet of Fort Gregg by blows from the enemy muskets but at the third attempt fought his way into the works.
—	Henry A. Thompson	Marine Corps	Private	(United States Marine Corps) USS Minnesota	Second Battle of Fort Fisher, North Carolina	USS Minnesota Jan 15, 1865	On board the USS Minnesota in the assault on Fort Fisher, 15 January 1865. Landing on the beach with the assaulting party from his ship, Private Thompson advanced partly through a breach in the palisades and nearer to the fort than any man from his ship despite enemy fire which killed or wounded many officers and men. When more than two-thirds of the men became seized with panic and retreated on the run, he remained with the party until dark, when it came safely away, bringing its wounded, its arms and its colors.
—	James H. Thompson	Army	Surgeon	(United States) U.S. Volunteers	New Bern, North Carolina	Mar 14, 1862	Voluntarily reconnoitered the enemy's position and carried orders under the hottest fire.
Medal of Honor winner Thompson, James B. (1843–1875) c1865	James B. Thompson	Army	Sergeant	Company G, 1st Pennsylvania Rifles, "Bucktails"	Battle of Gettysburg, Pennsylvania	Jul 3, 1863	Capture of flag of 15th Georgia Infantry (C.S.A.).
Head and shoulders of a white man with a mustache, wearing a suit coat with a star-shaped medal pinned to the left breast, over a white shirt.	James G. Thompson	Army	Private	(New York (state)) Company K, 4th New York Heavy Artillery Regiment	White Oak Road, Virginia	Apr 1, 1865	Made a hazardous reconnaissance through timber and slashings, preceding the Union line of battle, signaling the troops and leading them through the obstructions.
—	John Thompson	Army	Corporal	Company C, 1st Maryland Infantry	Battle of Hatcher's Run, Virginia	Feb 6, 1865	As color bearer with most conspicuous gallantry preceded his regiment in the assault and planted his flag upon the enemy's works.
Medal of Honor winner Thomas W Thompson (1839–1927) c1865	Thomas W. Thompson	Army	Sergeant	Company A, 66th Ohio Infantry	Battle of Chancellorsville, Virginia	May 2, 1863	One of a party of four who voluntarily brought into the Union lines, under fire, a wounded Confederate officer from whom was obtained valuable information concerning the enemy.
—	William Thompson	Navy	Signal Quartermaster	(United States Navy) USS Mohican	USS Mohican Forts Beauregard and Walker on Hilton Head	November 7, 1861	During action of the main squadron of ships against heavily defended Forts Beauregard and Walker on Hilton Head, 7 November 1861. Serving as signal quartermaster on board the USS Mohican, Thompson steadfastly steered the ship with a steady and bold heart under the batteries; was wounded by a piece of shell but remained at his station until he fell from loss of blood. Legs since amputated.
—	William P. Thompson*	Army	Sergeant	Company G, 20th Indiana Infantry Regiment	Battle of the Wilderness, Virginia	May 6, 1864	Capture of flag of 55th Virginia Infantry (C.S.A.).
Medal of Honor winner Thomson, Clifford (1834–1912) c1899	Clifford Thomson	Army	First Lieutenant	(New York (state)) Company A, 1st New York Volunteer Cavalry "Lincoln Cavalry"	Battle of Chancellorsville, Virginia	May 2, 1863	Volunteered to ascertain the character of approaching troops; rode up so closely as to distinguish the features of the enemy, and as he wheeled to return they opened fire with musketry, the Union troops returning same. Under a terrific fire from both sides Lieutenant Thomson rode back unhurt to the Federal lines, averting a disaster to the Army by his heroic act.
Head of a white man with wavy hair and a drooping mustache wearing a military jacket with shoulderboards.	Walter Thorn	Army	Second Lieutenant	, Company G, 116th United States Colored Infantry Regiment	Dutch Gap Canal, Virginia	Jan 1, 1865	After the fuze to the mined bulkhead had been lit, this officer, learning that the picket guard had not been withdrawn, mounted the bulkhead and at great personal peril warned the guard of its danger.
Medal of Honor winner Tibbets, Andrew W. (1830–1898) c1865	Andrew W. Tibbets	Army	Private	Company I, 3rd Iowa Volunteer Cavalry Regiment	Columbus, Georgia	Apr 16, 1865	Capture of flag and bearer, Austin's Battery (C.S.A.).
Medal of Honor winner Tilton, William (1834–1910) c1865	William Tilton	Army	Sergeant	Company C, 7th New Hampshire Infantry	Richmond Campaign, Virginia	1864	Gallant conduct in the field.
Medal of Honor winner Tinkham, Eugene M. (1842–1909) c1870	Eugene M. Tinkham	Army	Corporal	(New York (state)) Company H, 148th New York Volunteer Infantry	Battle of Cold Harbor, Virginia	Jun 3, 1864	Though himself wounded, voluntarily left the rifle pits, crept out between the lines and, exposed to the severe fire of the enemy's guns at close range, brought within the lines two wounded and helpless comrades.
—	Charles Titus	Army	Sergeant	Company H, 1st New Jersey Cavalry	Battle of Sayler's Creek, Virginia	Apr 6, 1865	Was among the first to check the enemy's countercharge.
	James W. Toban	Army	Sergeant	Company C, 9th Michigan Volunteer Cavalry Regiment	Aiken, South Carolina	Feb 11, 1865	Voluntarily and at great personal risk returned, in the face of the advance of the enemy, and rescued from impending death or capture, Major William C. Stevens, 9th Michigan Cavalry, who had been thrown from his horse.
	Edward P. Tobie	Army	Sergeant Major	1st Maine Volunteer Cavalry Regiment	Appomattox Campaign, Virginia	Mar 29, 1865 – Apr 9, 1865	Though severely wounded at Sailors Creek, 6 April, and at Farmville, 7 April, refused to go to the hospital, but remained with his regiment, performed the full duties of adjutant upon the wounding of that officer, and was present for duty at Appomattox.
Medal of Honor winner Tobin, John Michael (1841–1898) c1865	John M. Tobin	Army	First Lieutenant and Adjutant	9th Massachusetts Infantry Regiment	Battle of Malvern Hill, Virginia	Jul 1, 1862	Voluntarily took command of the 9th Massachusetts while adjutant, bravely fighting from 3 p.m. until dusk, rallying and re-forming the regiment under fire; twice picked up the regimental flag, the color bearer having been shot down, and placed it in worthy hands.
—	Samuel Todd	Navy	Quartermaster	(United States Navy) USS Brooklyn	USS Brooklyn Fort Morgan, Battle of Mobile Bay, Alabama	Aug 5, 1864	Stationed at the conn on board USS Brooklyn during action against rebel forts and gunboats and with the ram Tennessee in Mobile Bay, 5 August 1864. Despite severe damage to his ship and the loss of several men on board as enemy fire raked her decks from stem to stern, Todd performed his duties with outstanding skill and courage throughout the furious battle which resulted in the surrender of the prize rebel ram Tennessee and in the damaging and destruction of batteries at Fort Morgan.
	John J. Toffey	Army	First Lieutenant	Company G, 33rd New Jersey Infantry Regiment	Third Battle of Chattanooga, Tennessee	November 23, 1863	Although excused from duty on account of sickness, went to the front in command of a storming party and with conspicuous gallantry participated in the assault of Missionary Ridge; was here wounded and permanently disabled.
Medal of Honor winner Tomlin, Andrew Jackson (1845–1906) c1865	Andrew J. Tomlin	Marine Corps	Corporal	(United States Marine Corps) USS Wabash	USS Wabash Second Battle of Fort Fisher, North Carolina	Jan 15, 1865	Member of USS Wabash Marine Guard during the assault on Fort Fisher, on 15 January 1865. As one of 200 marines assembled to hold a line of entrenchments in the rear of the fort which the enemy threatened to attack in force following a retreat in panic by more than two-thirds of the assaulting ground forces, Corporal Tomlin took position in line and remained until morning when relief troops arrived from the fort. When one of his comrades was struck down by enemy fire, he unhesitatingly advanced under a withering fire of musketry into an open plain close to the fort and assisted the wounded man to a place of safety.
—	Aaron B. Tompkins	Army	Sergeant	Company G, 1st New Jersey Cavalry Regiment	Sailors Creek, Virginia	Apr 5, 1865	Charged into the enemy's ranks and captured a battle flag, having a horse shot under him and his cheeks and shoulders cut with a saber.
Head and torso of a white man with a long, full beard and curly hair, wearing a military jacket, unbuttoned at the stomach, over a white shirt.	Charles H. Tompkins	Army	First Lieutenant	(United States) 2nd US Cavalry Regiment	Fairfax, Virginia	Jun 1, 1861	Twice charged through the enemy's lines and, taking a carbine from an enlisted man, shot the enemy's captain.
—	Thomas Toohey	Army	Sergeant	Company F, 24th Wisconsin Volunteer Infantry Regiment	Second Battle of Franklin, Tennessee	Nov 30, 1864	Gallantry in action; voluntarily assisting in working guns of battery near right of the regiment after nearly every man had left them, the fire of the enemy being hotter at this than at any other point on the line.
—	William Toomer	Army	Sergeant	Company G, 127th Illinois Infantry Regiment	Battle of Vicksburg, Mississippi	May 22, 1863	Gallantry in the charge of the "volunteer storming party."
—	Ernst Torgler	Army	Sergeant	Company G, 37th Ohio Infantry	Ezra Chapel, Georgia	Jul 28, 1864	At great hazard of his life he saved his commanding officer, then badly wounded, from capture.
—	Andrew J. Tozier	Army	Sergeant	Company I, 20th Maine Infantry	Battle of Gettysburg, Pennsylvania	Jul 2, 1863	At the crisis of the engagement this soldier, a color bearer, stood alone in an advanced position, the regiment having been borne back, and defended his colors with musket and ammunition picked up at his feet.
Profile of an older, balding white man with a mustache.	Amasa Tracy	Army	Lieutenant Colonel	2nd Vermont Volunteer Infantry Regiment	Battle of Cedar Creek, Virginia	Oct 19, 1864	Took command of and led the brigade in the assault on the enemy's works
Profile of an older, balding white man with a short-cropped white beard, wearing a dark suit jacket over a white shirt and dark tie.	Benjamin F. Tracy	Army	Colonel	(New York (state)) 109th New York Volunteer Infantry Regiment	Battle of the Wilderness, Virginia	May 6, 1864	Seized the colors and led the regiment when other regiments had retired and then reformed his line and held it.
Head of a white man with a large drooping mustache and receding hairline, wearing a dark suit coat over a shirt and tie.	Charles H. Tracy	Army	Sergeant	Company A, 37th Massachusetts Infantry	Battle of Spotsylvania Court House, Virginia and Third Battle of Petersburg, Virginia	May 12, 1864 and Apr 2, 1865	At the risk of his own life, at Spotsylvania, 12 May 1864, assisted in carrying to a place of safety a wounded and helpless officer.
Medal of Honor winner Tracy, William Gardner (1842–1924) c1870	William G. Tracy	Army	Second Lieutenant	(New York (state)) Company I, 122nd New York Infantry	Battle of Chancellorsville, Virginia	May 2, 1863	Having been sent outside the lines to obtain certain information of great importance and having succeeded in his mission, was surprised upon his return by a large force of the enemy, regaining the Union lines only after greatly imperiling his life.
	Andrew Traynor	Army	Corporal	Company D, 1st Michigan Cavalry	Mason's Hill, Virginia	Mar 16, 1864	Having been surprised and captured by a detachment of guerrillas, this soldier, with other prisoners, seized the arms of the guard over them, killed 2 of the guerrillas, and enabled all the prisoners to escape.
Medal of Honor winner Treat, Howell Burr (1833–1912) c1870	Howell B. Treat	Army	Sergeant	Company I, 52nd Ohio Infantry	Buzzard's Roost, Georgia	May 11, 1864	Risked his life in saving a wounded comrade.
Medal of Honor winner Tremain, Henry Edwin (1840–1910) c1865	Henry E. Tremain	Army	Major and Aide de Camp	(United States) U.S. Volunteers	Battle of Resaca, Georgia	May 15, 1864	Voluntarily rode between the lines while 2 brigades of Union troops were firing into each other and stopped the firing.
—	John Tribe	Army	Private	(New York (state)) Company G, 5th New York Cavalry	Waterloo Bridge, Virginia	Aug 25, 1862	Voluntarily assisted in the burning and destruction of the bridge under heavy fire of the enemy.
—	Othniel Tripp	Navy	Chief Boatswain's Mate	(United States Navy) USS Seneca	USS Seneca Second Battle of Fort Fisher, North Carolina	Jan 15, 1865	On board USS Seneca in the assault on Fort Fisher, 15 January 1865. Despite severe enemy fire which halted an attempt by his assaulting party to enter the stockade, Tripp boldly charged through the gap in the stockade although the center of the line, being totally unprotected, fell back along the open beach and left too few in the ranks to attempt an offensive operation.
	Howell G. Trogden	Army	Private	Company B, 8th Missouri Infantry	Battle of Vicksburg, Mississippi	May 22, 1863	Gallantry in the charge of the "volunteer storming party." He carried his regiment's flag and tried to borrow a gun to defend it.
Medal of Honor winner Truell, Edwin M. (1841–1907) c1899	Edwin M. Truell	Army	Private	Company E, 12th Wisconsin Infantry	Near Atlanta, Georgia	Jul 21, 1864	Although severely wounded in a charge, he remained with the regiment until again severely wounded, losing his leg.
—	Alexander H. Truett	Navy	Coxswain	(United States Navy) USS Richmond	USS Richmond Fort Morgan, Battle of Mobile Bay, Alabama	Aug 5, 1864	On board USS Richmond during action against rebel forts and gunboats and with the ram Tennessee in Mobile Bay, 5 August 1864. Despite damage to his ship and the loss of several men on board as enemy fire raked her decks, Truett performed his duties with skill and courage throughout a furious 2-hour battle which resulted in the surrender of the rebel ram Tennessee and in the damaging and destruction of batteries at Fort Morgan.
—	Allen Tucker	Army	Sergeant	Company F, 10th Connecticut Infantry Regiment	Third Battle of Petersburg, Virginia	Apr 2, 1865	For gallantry as Color Bearer in the assault on Fort Gregg
—	Jacob R. Tucker	Army	Corporal	Company G, 4th Maryland Infantry Regiment	Petersburg, Virginia	Apr 1, 1865	Was one of the three soldiers most conspicuous in the final assault.
Medal of Honor winner Tweedale, John (1841–1920) c1899	John Tweedale	Army	Private	Company B, 15th Pennsylvania Cavalry	Battle of Stones River, Murfreesboro, Tennessee	Dec 31, 1862 – Jan 1, 1863	Gallantry in action.
	Voltaire P. Twombly	Army	Corporal	Company F, 2nd Iowa Infantry	Fort Donelson, Tennessee	Feb 15, 1862	Took the colors after three of the color guard had fallen, and although most instantly knocked down by a spent ball, immediately arose and bore the colors to the end of the engagement.
—	George W. Tyrrell	Army	Corporal	Company H, 5th Ohio Infantry	Battle of Resaca, Georgia	May 14, 1864	Capture of flag.

== U ==
Recipients are listed alphabetically by last name. Posthumous receipt is denoted by an asterisk.

This along with the *, indicates that the Medal of Honor was awarded posthumously

Image	Name	Service	Rank	Unit/command	Place of action	Date of action	Notes
Head and shoulders of a balding white man with a mustache, wearing a dark suit coat.	George Uhrl	Army	Sergeant	(United States) Battery F, 5th Artillery Regiment	White Oak Swamp Bridge, Virginia	Jun 30, 1862	Was one of a party of three who, under heavy fire of advancing enemy, voluntarily secured and saved from capture a field gun belonging to another battery, and which had been deserted by its officers and men.
Medal of Honor winner Urell, Michael Emmet (1844–1910)	Micheal E. Urell	Army	Private	(New York (state)) Company E, 82nd New York Volunteer Infantry Regiment	Bristoe Station, Virginia	Oct 14, 1863	Gallantry in action while detailed as color bearer; was severely wounded.

== V ==
Recipients are listed alphabetically by last name. Posthumous receipt is denoted by an asterisk.

This along with the *, indicates that the Medal of Honor was awarded posthumously

Image	Name	Service	Rank	Unit/command	Place of action	Date of action	Notes
—	John Vale	Army	Private	Company H, 2nd Minnesota Infantry Regiment	Nolensville, Tennessee	Feb 15, 1863	Was one of a detachment of 16 men who heroically defended a wagon train against the attack of 125 cavalry, repulsed the attack and saved the train.
Medal of Honor winner Vance, Wilson J (1845–1911)	Wilson Vance	Army	Private	Company B, 21st Ohio Infantry	Battle of Stones River, Murfreesboro, Tennessee	Dec 31, 1862	Voluntarily and under a heavy fire, while his command was falling back, rescued a wounded and helpless comrade from death or capture.
	John M. Vanderslice	Army	Private	Company D, 8th Pennsylvania Cavalry	Battle of Hatcher's Run, Virginia	Feb 6, 1865	Was the first man to reach the enemy's rifle pits, which were taken in the charge.
—	Joseph Van Matre	Army	Private	Company G, 116th Ohio Infantry	Third Battle of Petersburg, Virginia	Apr 2, 1865	In the assault on Fort Gregg, this soldier climbed upon the parapet and fired down into the fort as fast as the loaded guns could be passed up to him by comrades.
Medal of Honor winner Vantine, Joseph Ebur (1835–1904)	Joseph E. Vantine	Navy	First Class Fireman	(United States Navy) USS Richmond	on board USS Richmond	March 14, 1863	Serving on board the USS Richmond in the attack on Port Hudson, 14 March 1863. Damaged by a 6-inch solid rifle shot which shattered the starboard safety-valve chamber and also damaged the port safety valve, the fire-room of the Richmond immediately filled with steam to place it in an extremely critical condition. Acting courageously in this crisis, Vantine persisted in penetrating the steam-filled room in order to haul the hot fires of the furnaces and continued this action until the gravity of the situation had been lessened.
—	Pinkerton R. Vaughn	Marine Corps	Sergeant	(United States Marine Corps) USS Mississippi	on board USS Mississippi	Mar 14, 1863	Serving on board the USS Mississippi during her abandonment and firing in the action with the Port Hudson batteries, 14 March 1863. During the abandonment of the Mississippi which had to be grounded, Sgt. Vaughn rendered invaluable assistance to his commanding officer, remaining with the ship until all the crew had landed and the ship had been fired to prevent its falling into enemy hands. Persistent until the last, and conspicuously cool under the heavy shellfire, Sgt. Vaughn was finally ordered to save himself as he saw fit.
—	Charles Veale	Army	Private	Company D, 4th United States Colored Infantry Regiment	Battle of Chaffin's Farm, Virginia	Sep 29, 1864	Seized the national colors after two color bearers had been shot down close to the enemy's works, and bore them through the remainder of the battle.
Medal of Honor winner Veale, Moses (1832–1917)	Moses Veale	Army	Captain	Company F, 109th Pennsylvania Infantry Regiment	Wauhatchie, Tennessee	Oct 28, 1863	Gallantry in action manifesting throughout the engagement coolness, zeal, judgment, and courage. His horse was shot from under him and he was hit by four enemy bullets.
Profile of a white man with a long mustache and goatee wearing a suit coat, vest, and bow tie. Below are the words "Wheelock G. Veazey, Judge Advocate General, Rutland, Vt."	Wheelock G. Veazey	Army	Colonel	16th Vermont Volunteer Infantry Regiment	Battle of Gettysburg, Pennsylvania	Jul 3, 1863	Rapidly assembled his regiment and charged the enemy's flank; charged front under heavy fire, and charged and destroyed a Confederate brigade, all this with new troops in their first battle.
Medal of Honor winner Vernay, James David (1834–1918)	James D. Vernay	Army	Second Lieutenant	Company B, 11th Illinois Infantry	Battle of Vicksburg, Mississippi	Apr 22, 1863	Served gallantly as a volunteer with the crew of the steamer Horizon that, under a heavy fire, passed the Confederate batteries.
—	James W. Verney	Navy	Chief Quartermaster	(United States Navy) USS Pontoosuc	USS Pontoosuc First and Second Battle of Fort Fisher, North Carolina	Dec 24, 1864 – Feb 22, 1865	Served as chief quartermaster on board the USS Pontoosuc during the capture of Fort Fisher and Wilmington, 24 December 1864 to 22 February 1865. Carrying out his duties faithfully throughout this period, Verney was recommended for gallantry and skill and for his cool courage while under fire of the enemy throughout these various actions.
	Victor Vifquain	Army	Lieutenant Colonel	97th Illinois Infantry Regiment	Battle of Fort Blakeley, Alabama	Apr 9, 1865	Captured the enemy flag
Medal of Honor winner Von Vegesack, Ernst Mathias Peter (1820–1903)	Ernest von Vegesack	Army	Major and Aide de Camp	(United States) U.S. Volunteers	Battle of Gaines' Mill, Virginia	Jun 27, 1862	While voluntarily serving as aide-de-camp, successfully and advantageously charged the position of troops under fire.

== W ==
Recipients are listed alphabetically by last name. Posthumous receipt is denoted by an asterisk.

This along with the *, indicates that the Medal of Honor was awarded posthumously

Image	Name	Service	Rank	Unit/command	Place of action	Date of action	Notes
—	John H. Wageman	Army	Private	Company I, 60th Ohio Infantry	Second Battle of Petersburg, Virginia	Jun 17, 1864	For extraordinary heroism on 17 June 1864, in action at Petersburg, Virginia. Private Wageman remained with the command after being severely wounded until he had fired all the cartridges in his possession, when he had to be carried from the field.
—	Maurice Wagg	Navy	Coxswain	(United States Navy) USS Rhode Island	USS Rhode Island	December 31, 1862	For extraordinary heroism in action while serving on board USS Rhode Island, which was engaged in saving the lives of the officers and crew of USS Monitor off Cape Hatteras, North Carolina, 30 December 1862. Participating in the hazardous task of rescuing the officers and crew of the sinking Monitor, Coxswain Wagg distinguished himself by meritorious conduct during this operation.
Medal of Honor winner Wagner, John W. (1837–1896)	John W. Wagner	Army	Corporal	Company F, 8th Missouri Volunteer Infantry Regiment	Battle of Vicksburg, Mississippi	May 22, 1863	For gallantry in the charge of the volunteer storming party on 22 May 1863, in action at Vicksburg, Mississippi.
	John Wainwright	Army	First Lieutenant	Company F, 97th Pennsylvania Infantry	Second Battle of Fort Fisher, North Carolina	Jan 15, 1865	For gallant and meritorious conduct on 15 January 1865, while serving with Company F, 97th Pennsylvania Infantry, in action at Fort Fisher, North Carolina, where, as first lieutenant, he commanded the regiment.
Medal of Honor winner Walker, James C. (1843–1923)	James C. Walker	Army	Private	Company K, 31st Ohio Infantry	Battle of Missionary Ridge, Tennessee	Nov 25, 1863	For extraordinary heroism on 25 November 1863, in action at Missionary Ridge, Tennessee. After two Color Bearers had fallen, Private Walker seized the flag and carried it forward, assisting in the capture of a battery. Shortly thereafter he captured the flag of the 41st Alabama and the Color Bearer
Head and shoulders of a white woman with straight hair pulled back into netting, wearing a tunic with a star-shaped medal hanging from a ribbon pinned to the left breast.	Mary E. Walker	Army	Contract Acting Assistant Surgeon (civilian)	(United States)	Various	July 1861 – September 1864	Whereas it appears from official reports that Dr. Mary E. Walker, a graduate of medicine, "has rendered valuable service to the Government, and her efforts have been earnest and untiring in a variety of ways," and that she was assigned to duty and served as an assistant surgeon in charge of female prisoners at Louisville, Ky., upon the recommendation of Major-Generals Sherman and Thomas, and faithfully served as contract surgeon in the service of the United States, and has devoted herself with much patriotic zeal to the sick and wounded soldiers, both in the field and hospitals, to the detriment of her own health, and has also endured hardships as a prisoner of war four months in a Southern prison while acting as contract surgeon; and Whereas by reason of her not being a commissioned officer in the military service, a brevet or honorary rank cannot, under existing laws, be conferred upon her; and Whereas in the opinion of the President an honorable recognition of her services and sufferings should be made: It is ordered, That a testimonial thereof shall be hereby made and given to the said Dr. Mary E. Walker, and that the usual medal of honor for meritorious services be given her.
Medal of Honor winner Wall, Jerry C. (1841–1930)	Jerry Wall	Army	Private	(New York (state)) Company B, 126th New York Volunteer Infantry	Battle of Gettysburg, Pa.	Jul 3, 1863	For extraordinary heroism on 3 July 1863, in action at Gettysburg, Pennsylvania, for capture of flag.
Medal of Honor winner Wallar, Francis A. (1840–1911)	Francis A. Wallar	Army	Corporal	Company I, 6th Wisconsin Volunteer Infantry Regiment	Battle of Gettysburg, Pennsylvania	Jul 1, 1863	For extraordinary heroism on 1 July 1863, in action at Gettysburg, Pennsylvania, for capture of flag of 2d Mississippi Infantry (Confederate States of America)..
Medal of Honor winner Walling, William Henry (1830–1912)	William H. Walling	Army	Captain	(New York (state)) Company C, 142nd New York Volunteer Infantry	First Battle of Fort Fisher, North Carolina	Dec 25, 1864	For extraordinary heroism on 25 December 1864, in action at Fort Fisher, North Carolina. During the bombardment of the fort by the fleet, Captain Walling captured and brought the flag of the fort, the flagstaff having been shot down.
Medal of Honor winner Walsh, John J. (1841–1924)	John Walsh	Army	Corporal	(New York (state)) Company D, 5th New York Cavalry Regiment	Battle of Cedar Creek, Virginia	Oct 19, 1864	For extraordinary heroism on 19 October 1864, in action at Cedar Creek, Virginia. Corporal Walsh recaptured the flag of the 15th New Jersey Infantry. 15th New Jersey Infantry.
Medal of Honor winner Walton, George Washington (1844–1920)	George W. Walton	Army	Private	Company C, 97th Pennsylvania Infantry	Fort Hell, Petersburg, Virginia	Aug 29, 1864	For extraordinary heroism on 29 August 1864, in action at Fort Hell, Petersburg, Virginia. Private Walton went outside the trenches, under heavy fire at short range, and rescued a comrade who had been wounded and thrown out of the trench by an exploding shell.
Medal of Honor winner Wambsgan, Martin (1829–1911)	Martin Wambsgan	Army	Private	(New York (state)) Company D, 90th New York Volunteer Infantry Regiment	Battle of Cedar Creek, Virginia	Oct 19, 1864	While the enemy were in close proximity, this soldier sprang forward and bore off in safety the regimental colors, the color bearer having fallen on the field of battle.
—	James Ward	Navy	Quarter Gunner	(United States Navy) USS Lackawanna	USS LackawannaFort Morgan, Battle of Mobile Bay, Alabama	Aug 5, 1864	Serving as gunner on board USS Lackawanna during successful attacks against Fort Morgan, rebel gunboats and the ram Tennessee in Mobile Bay, 5 August 1864. Although wounded and ordered below, Ward refused to go, but rendered aid at one of the guns when the crew was disabled. He subsequently remained in the chains, heaving the lead, until nearly caught in the collision with the ram Tennessee. He continued to serve bravely throughout the action which resulted in the capture of the prize ram Tennessee and in the damaging and destruction of Fort Morgan.
Medal of Honor winner Ward, Nelson W. (1837–1929)	Nelson W. Ward	Army	Private	Company M, 11th Pennsylvania Cavalry	Staunton River Bridge, Virginia	Jun 25, 1864	Voluntarily took part in a charge; went alone in front of his regiment under a heavy fire to secure the body of his captain, who had been killed in the action.
Medal of Honor winner Ward, Thomas J. (1837–1924)	Thomas J. Ward	Army	Private	Company C, 116th Illinois Infantry Regiment	Battle of Vicksburg, Mississippi	May 22, 1863	For gallantry in the charge of the volunteer storming party on 22 May 1863, in action at Vicksburg, Mississippi.
Medal of Honor winner Ward, William H. (1840–1927)	William H. Ward	Army	Captain	Company B, 47th Ohio Infantry	Battle of Vicksburg, Mississippi	May 3, 1863	Voluntarily commanded the expedition which, under cover of darkness, attempted to run the enemy's batteries.
—	John Warden	Army	Corporal	Company E, 55th Illinois Infantry Regiment	Battle of Vicksburg, Mississippi	May 22, 1863	For gallantry in the charge of the volunteer storming party on 22 May 1863, in action at Vicksburg, Mississippi.
Medal of Honor winner Warfel, Henry Clay (1844-1923	Henry C. Warfel	Army	Private	Company A, 1st Pennsylvania Cavalry	Paines Crossroads, Virginia	Apr 5, 1865	Capture of Virginia State colors.
—	David Warren	Navy	Coxswain	(United States Navy) USS Monticello	USS Monticello	Jun 23, 1864 – Jun 25, 1864	Served as coxswain on board USS Monticello during the reconnaissance of the harbor and water defenses of Wilmington, North Carolina, 23 to 25 June 1864. Taking part in a reconnaissance of enemy defenses which lasted 2 days and nights, Warren courageously carried out his duties during this action which resulted in the capture of a mail carrier and mail, the cutting of a telegraph wire, and the capture of a large group of prisoners. Although in immediate danger from the enemy, Warren showed gallantry and coolness throughout this action which resulted in the gaining of much vital information of the rebel defenses.
Head and shoulders of a white man with a mustache and pince-nez glasses, wearing a dark suit coat over a light-colored vest, shirt, and tie.	Francis E. Warren	Army	Corporal	Company C, 49th Massachusetts Infantry Regiment	Port Hudson, Louisiana	May 27, 1863	Voluntarily took part in an attack against the enemy's works under a heavy fire in advance of the general assault. Later Governor of Wyoming and a U.S. Senator.
Profile of a dark-haired white man with a mustache and scraggly goatee, wearing a double-breasted military jacket and sitting with a military cap in his lap.	Alexander S. Webb	Army	Brigadier General	(United States) U.S. Volunteers	Battle of Gettysburg, Pennsylvania	Jul 3, 1863	Distinguished personal gallantry in leading his men forward at a critical period in the contest.
Medal of Honor winner Webb, James W. (1841–1915)	James Webb	Army	Private	(New York (state)) Company F, 5th New York Volunteer Infantry	Second Battle of Bull Run, Virginia	Aug 30, 1862	Under heavy fire voluntarily carried information to a battery commander that enabled him to save his guns from capture. Was severely wounded, but refused to go to the hospital and participated in the remainder of the campaign.
Medal of Honor winner Webber, Alason Pitts (1828–1902)	Alason P. Webber	Army	Musician	86th Illinois Infantry Regiment	Kenesaw Mountain, Georgia	Jun 27, 1864	Voluntarily joined in a charge against the enemy, which was repulsed, and by his rapid firing in the face of the enemy enabled many of the wounded to return to the Federal lines; with others, held the advance of the enemy while temporary works were being constructed.
—	Henry S. Webster	Navy	Landsman	(United States Navy) USS Susquehanna	USS Susquehanna Second Battle of Fort Fisher, North Carolina	Jan 15, 1865	On board USS Susquehanna during the assault on Fort Fisher, 15 January 1865. When enemy fire halted the attempt by his landing party to enter the fort and more than two-thirds of the men fell back along the open beach, Webster voluntarily remained with one of his wounded officers, under fire, until aid could be obtained to bring him to the rear.
—	Charles H. Weeks	Navy	Captain of the Foretop	(United States Navy) USS Montauk	USS Montauk	September 21, 1864	Served as captain of the foretop on board USS Montauk, 21 September 1864. During the night of 21 September, when fire was discovered in the magazine lightroom of that vessel, causing a panic and demoralizing the crew, Weeks, notwithstanding the cry of "fire in the magazine," displayed great presence of mind and rendered valuable service in extinguishing the flames which were imperiling the ship and the men on board.
Medal of Honor winner Weeks, John Henry (1845–1911)	John H. Weeks	Army	Private	(New York (state)) Company H, 122nd New York Infantry	Battle of Spotsylvania Court House, Virginia	May 12, 1864	Capture of flag and color bearer using an empty cocked rifle while outnumbered 5 or 6.
—	Henry C. Weir	Army	Captain and Assistant Adjutant General	(United States) U.S. Volunteers	St. Mary's Church, Virginia	Jun 24, 1864	The division being hard pressed and falling back, this officer dismounted, gave his horse to a wounded officer, and thus enabled him to escape. Afterwards, on foot, Captain Weir rallied and took command of some stragglers and helped to repel the last charge of the enemy.
—	George W. Welch	Army	Private	Company A, 11th Missouri Volunteer Infantry Regiment	Battle of Nashville, Tennessee	Dec 16, 1864	for extraordinary heroism on 16 December 1864, in action at Nashville, Tennessee. Private Welch captured the flag of the 13th Alabama Infantry (Confederate States of America).
—	Richard Welch	Army	Corporal	Company E, 37th Massachusetts Infantry Regiment	Third Battle of Petersburg, Virginia	Apr 2, 1865	For extraordinary heroism on 2 April 1865, in action at Petersburg, Virginia, for capture of flag.
Medal of Honor winner Welch, Stephen (1824–1906)	Stephen Welch	Army	Sergeant	(New York (state)) Company C, 154th New York Volunteer Infantry	Battle of Rocky Face Ridge, Dug Gap, Georgia	May 8, 1864	For extraordinary heroism on 8 May 1864, in action at Dug Gap, Georgia. Sergeant Welch risked his life in rescuing a wounded comrade under fire of the enemy.
—	Henry S. Wells*	Army	Private	(New York (state)) Company C, 148th New York Volunteer Infantry	Battle of Chaffin's Farm, Virginia	Sep 29, 1864	For extraordinary heroism on 29 September 1864, in action at Chapin's Farm, Virginia. With two comrades, Private Wells took position in advance of the skirmish line, within short distance of the enemy's gunners, and drove them from their guns.
—	Thomas M. Wells	Army	Chief Bugler	(New York (state)) 6th New York Cavalry Regiment	Battle of Cedar Creek, Virginia	Oct 19, 1864	For extraordinary heroism on 19 October 1864, in action at Cedar Creek, Virginia, for capture of colors of 44th Georgia Infantry (Confederate States of America).
Medal of Honor winner	William Wells	Army	Major	1st Vermont Cavalry	Battle of Gettysburg, Pennsylvania	Jul 3, 1863	Led the second battalion of his regiment in a daring charge.
—	William Wells	Navy	Quartermaster	(United States Navy) USS Richmond	USS Richmond Fort Morgan, Battle of Mobile Bay, Alabama	Aug 5, 1864	As landsman and lookout on board USS Richmond during action against rebel forts and gunboats and with the ram Tennessee in Mobile Bay, 5 August 1864. Despite damage to his ship the loss of several men on board as enemy fire raked her decks, Wells performed his duties with skill and courage throughout a furious 2-hour battle which resulted in the surrender of the rebel ram Tennessee and in the damaging and destruction of batteries at Fort Morgan.
Medal of Honor winner	Edward Welsh	Army	Private	Company D, 54th Ohio Infantry	Battle of Vicksburg, Mississippi	May 22, 1863	For gallantry in the charge of the volunteer storming party on 22 May 1863, in action at Vicksburg, Mississippi.
—	James Welsh	Army	Private	Company E, 4th Rhode Island Infantry	Battle of the Crater, Petersburg, Virginia	Jul 30, 1864	For extraordinary heroism on 30 July 1864, in action at Petersburg, Virginia. Private Welsh bore off the regimental colors after the color sergeant had been wounded and the color corporal bearing the colors killed thereby saving the colors from capture.
—	William Westerhold	Army	Sergeant	(New York (state)) Company G, 52nd New York Volunteer Infantry	Battle of Spotsylvania Court House, Virginia	May 12, 1864	For extraordinary heroism on 12 May 1864, in action at Spotsylvania, Virginia, for capture of flag of 23rd Virginia Infantry (Confederate States of America).
Medal of Honor winner	John F. Weston	Army	Major	4th Kentucky Cavalry	Near Wetumpka, Alabama	Apr 13, 1865	For extraordinary heroism on 13 April 1865, in action at Wetumpka, Alabama. Major Weston, with a small detachment, while en route to destroy steamboats loaded with supplies for the enemy, was stopped by an unfordable river, but with five of his men swam the river, captured two leaky canoes, and ferried his men across. He then encountered and defeated the enemy, and on reaching Wetumpka found the steamers anchored in midstream. By a ruse obtained possession of a boat, with which he reached the steamers and demanded and received their surrender.
Head and torso of a white man with a close-cropped beard and a very wide, pointed mustache, wearing a military jacket with breast pockets and shoulder boards.	Loyd Wheaton	Army	Lieutenant Colonel	8th Illinois Infantry	Battle of Fort Blakeley, Alabama	Apr 9, 1865	For extraordinary heroism on 9 April 1865, in action at Fort Blakely, Alabama. Lieutenant Colonel Wheaton led the right wing of his regiment, and, springing through an embrasure, was the first to enter the enemy's works, against a strong fire of artillery and infantry.
—	Daniel D. Wheeler	Army	First Lieutenant	Company G, 4th Vermont Infantry	Salem Heights, Virginia	May 3, 1863	For distinguished bravery in action on 3 May 1863, in action at Salem Heights, Fredericksburg, Virginia, where he was wounded and had a horse shot from under him.
—	Henry W. Wheeler	Army	Private	Company A, 2nd Maine Volunteer Infantry	First Battle of Bull Run, Virginia	July 21, 1861	For extraordinary heroism on 21 July 1861, in action at Bull Run, Virginia. Private Wheeler voluntarily accompanied his commanding officer and assisted in removing the dead and wounded from the field under a heavy fire of artillery and musketry.
Medal of Honor winner	William M. Wherry	Army	First Lieutenant	Company D, 3rd Missouri Volunteer Infantry	Battle of Wilson's Creek, Missouri	Aug 10, 1861	For extraordinary heroism on 10 August 1861, in action at Wilson's Creek, Missouri. First Lieutenant Wherry displayed conspicuous coolness and heroism in rallying troops that were recoiling under heavy fire.
Medal of Honor winner	Edward W. Whitaker	Army	Captain	Company E, 1st Connecticut Infantry Regiment	Reams Station, Virginia	Jun 29, 1864	For extraordinary heroism on 29 June 1864, in action at Reams' Station, Virginia. While acting as an aide Captain Whitaker voluntarily carried dispatches from the commanding general to General Meade, forcing his way with a single troop of Cavalry, through an Infantry division of the enemy in the most distinguished manner, though he lost half his escort.
Medal of Honor winner	Adam White	Army	Corporal	Company G, 11th West Virginia Infantry Regiment	Hatcher's Run, Third Battle of Petersburg, Virginia	Apr 2, 1865	For extraordinary heroism on 2 April 1865, in action at Hatcher's Run, Virginia, for capture of flag.
Medal of Honor winner	J. Henry White	Army	Private	Company A, 90th Pennsylvania Infantry	Rappanhannock Station, Virginia	Aug 23, 1862	for extraordinary heroism on 23 August 1862, in action at Rappahannock Station, Virginia. At the imminent risk of his life, Private White crawled to a nearby spring within the enemy's range and exposed to constant fire, filled a large number of canteens, and returned in safety to the relief of his comrades who were suffering from want of water.
—	Joseph White	Navy	Captain of the Gun	(United States Navy) USS New Ironsides	USS New Ironsides First and Second Battle of Fort Fisher, North Carolina	Dec 1864 and Jan 1865	For extraordinary heroism in action while serving on board the USS New Ironsides during action in several attacks on Fort Fisher, North Carolina, 24 and 25 December 1864; and 13,14, and 15 January 1865. The ship steamed in and took the lead in the ironclad division close inshore and immediately opened its starboard battery in a barrage of well-directed fire to cause several fires and explosions and dismount several guns during the first two days of fighting. Taken under fire as she steamed into position on 13 January, the New Ironsides fought all day and took on ammunition at night despite severe weather conditions. When the enemy came out of his bombproofs to defend the fort against the storming party, the ships battery disabled nearly every gun on the fort facing the shore before the ceasefire order was given by the flagship.
Medal of Honor winner	Patrick H. White	Army	Captain	Chicago Mercantile Battery, Illinois Light Artillery	Battle of Vicksburg, Mississippi	May 22, 1863	For extraordinary heroism on 22 May 1863, while serving with Chicago Mercantile Battery, Illinois Light Artillery, in action at Vicksburg, Mississippi. Captain White carried, with others, by hand, a cannon up to and fired it through an embrasure of the enemy's works.
Medal of Honor winner	John M. Whitehead	Army	Chaplain	15th Indiana Volunteer Infantry Regiment	Battle of Stones River, Murfreesboro, Tennessee	Dec 31, 1862	For extraordinary heroism on 31 December 1862, in action at Stone River, Tennessee. Chaplain Whitehead went to the front during a desperate contest and unaided carried to the rear several wounded and helpless soldiers.
—	Daniel Whitfield	Navy	Quartermaster	(United States Navy) USS Lackawanna	USS Lackawanna Fort Morgan, Battle of Mobile Bay, Alabama	Aug 5, 1864	For extraordinary heroism in action while serving as quartermaster on board USS Lackawanna during successful attacks against Fort Morgan, rebel gunboats and the rebel ram Tennessee in Mobile Bay, Alabama, 5 August 1864. Acting as Captain of a gun, Quartermaster Whitfield coolly stood by his gun, holding on to the lock string and waited alongside the rebel ram Tennessee until able to fire the shot that entered her port. Quartermaster Whitfield courageously carried out his duties during the prolonged action which resulted in the capture of the prize ram Tennessee and in the damaging and destruction of Fort Morgan.
Medal of Honor winner	Frank M. Whitman	Army	Private	Company G, 35th Massachusetts Infantry Regiment	Battle of Antietam, Maryland and Battle of Spotsylvania Court House, Virginia	Sep 17, 1862 and May 18, 1864	For extraordinary heroism on 17 September 1862, in action at Antietam, Maryland. Private Whitman was among the last to leave the field at Antietam and was instrumental in saving the lives of several of his comrades at the imminent risk of his own. At Spotsylvania, Virginia, on 18 May 1864, he was foremost in line in the assault, where he lost a leg.
Medal of Honor winner	John Whitmore	Army	Private	Company F, 119th Illinois Infantry Regiment	Battle of Fort Blakeley, Alabama	Apr 9, 1865	For extraordinary heroism on 9 April 1865, in action at Fort Blakely, Alabama, for capture of flag.
	William G. Whitney	Army	Sergeant	Company B, 11th Michigan Infantry	Battle of Chickamauga, Georgia	Sep 20, 1863	For extraordinary heroism on 20 September 1863, in action at Chickamauga, Georgia. As the enemy were about to charge, Sergeant Whitney went outside the temporary Union works among the dead and wounded enemy and at great exposure to himself cut off and removed their cartridge boxes, bringing the same within the Union lines, the ammunition being used with good effect in again repulsing the attack.
Medal of Honor winner	Edward N. Whittier	Army	First Lieutenant	5th Battery, Maine Volunteer Light Artillery	Battle of Fisher's Hill, Virginia	Sep 22, 1864	For extraordinary heroism on 22 September 1864, while serving with, in action at Fisher's Hill, Virginia. While acting as assistant adjutant general, Artillery Brigade, 6th Army Corps, First Lieutenant Whittier went over the enemy's works, mounted, with the assaulting column, to gain quicker possession of the guns and to turn them upon the enemy.
Medal of Honor winner	Andrew J. Widick	Army	Private	Company B, 116th Illinois Infantry Regiment	Battle of Vicksburg, Mississippi	May 22, 1863	For gallantry in the charge of the volunteer storming party on 22 May 1863, in action at Vicksburg, Mississippi.
—	Franklin L. Wilcox	Navy	Ordinary Seaman	(United States Navy) USS Minnesota	USS MinnesotaSecond Battle of Fort Fisher, North Carolina	Jan 15, 1865	For extraordinary heroism in action while serving on board USS Minnesota in action during the assault on Fort Fisher, North Carolina, 15 January 1865. Landing on the beach with the assaulting party from his ship, Ordinary Seaman Wilcox advanced to the top of the sand hill and partly through the breach in the palisades despite enemy fire which killed and wounded many officers and men. When more than two-thirds of the men became seized with panic and retreated on the run, he remained with the party until dark when it came safely away, bringing its wounded, its arms and its colors.
Medal of Honor winner	William H. Wilcox	Army	Sergeant	Company G, 9th New Hampshire Infantry	Battle of Spotsylvania Court House, Virginia	May 12, 1864	For extraordinary heroism on 12 May 1864, in action at Spotsylvania, Virginia. Sergeant Wilcox took command of his company, deployed as skirmishers, after the officers in command of the skirmish line had both been wounded, conducting himself gallantly; afterwards, becoming separated from command, he asked and obtained permission to fight in another company..
—	James Wiley	Army	Sergeant	(New York (state)) Company B, 59th New York Volunteer Infantry Regiment	Battle of Gettysburg, Pennsylvania	Jul 3, 1863	For extraordinary heroism on 3 July 1863, in action at Gettysburg, Pennsylvania, for capture of flag of a Georgia regiment. Later captured and died at Andersonville, Georgia, 2 February 1865.
Medal of Honor winner	George Wilhelm	Army	Captain	Company F, 56th Ohio Infantry	Champion Hill, or Bakers Creek, Mississippi	May 16, 1863	For extraordinary heroism on 16 May 1863, while serving with, in action at Champion Hill (Baker's Creek), Mississippi. Having been badly wounded in the breast and captured, Captain Wilhelm made a prisoner of his captor and brought him into camp.
—	Henry Wilkes	Navy	Landsman	(United States Navy) U.S. Picket Boat No. 1	U.S. Picket Boat No. 1	October 27, 1864	for extraordinary heroism in action while serving on board U.S. Picket Boat No.1 in action, 27 October 1864, against the Confederate Ram, Albemarle, which had resisted repeated attacks by our steamers and had kept a large force of vessels employed in watching her. The picket boat, equipped with a spar torpedo, succeeded in passing the enemy pickets within 20 yards without being discovered and them made for the Albemarle under a full head of steam. Immediately taken under fire by the ram, the small boat plunged on, jumped the log boom which encircled the target and exploded its torpedo under the port bow of the ram. The picket boat was destroyed by enemy fire and almost the entire crew taken prisoner or lost.
Medal of Honor winner	Perry Wilkes	Navy	Pilot	(United States Navy) USS Signal	USS Signal	May 5, 1864	For extraordinary heroism in action while serving as Pilot on board the USS Signal, Red River, 5 May 1864. Proceeding up the Red River, the USS Signal engaged a large force of enemy field batteries and sharpshooters, returning their fire until the ship was totally disabled, at which time the white flag was ordered raised. Acting as Pilot throughout the battle, Perry Wilkes stood by his wheel until it was disabled in his hands by a bursting enemy shell.
—	Leander A. Wilkins	Army	Sergeant	Company H, 9th New Hampshire Volunteer Infantry Regiment	Battle of the Crater, Petersburg, Virginia	Jul 30, 1864	For extraordinary heroism on 30 July 1864, in action at Petersburg, Virginia. Sergeant Wilkins recaptured the colors of 21st Massachusetts Infantry in a hand-to-hand encounter.
Head and torso of a white man with a full beard, wearing a partially unbuttoned double-breasted military jacket, a handkerchief tied around his neck, and a single medal pinned to his left breast.	Orlando B. Willcox	Army	Colonel	1st Michigan Infantry	First Battle of Bull Run, Virginia	Jul 21, 1861	For extraordinary heroism on 21 July 1861, at Bull Run, Virginia. Colonel Willcox led repeated charges until wounded and taken prisoner.
—	Anthony Williams	Navy	Sailmaker's mate	(United States Navy) USS Pontoosuc	USS Pontoosuc First and Second Battle of Fort Fisher, North Carolina	Dec 24, 1864 – Feb 22, 1865	For extraordinary heroism in action while serving as sailmaker's mate on board the USS Pontoosuc during the capture of Forts Fisher and Wilmington, North Carolina, 24 December 1864 to 22 February 1865. Carrying out his duties faithfully throughout this period, Sailmaker's Mate Williams was recommended for gallantry and skill and for his cool courage while under the fire of the enemy throughout these various actions.
—	Augustus Williams	Navy	Seaman	(United States Navy) USS Santiago de Cuba	USS Santiago de Cuba Second Battle of Fort Fisher, North Carolina	Jan 15, 1865	For extraordinary heroism in action while serving on board the USS Santiago de Cuba during the assault by the fleet on Fort Fisher, North Carolina on 15 January 1865. When the landing party to which he was attached charged on the fort with a cheer, and with determination to plant their colors on the ramparts, Seaman Williams remained steadfast when they reached the foot of the fort and more than two-thirds of the marines and sailors fell back in panic. Taking cover when the enemy concentrated his fire on the remainder of the group, he alone remained with his executive officer, subsequently withdrawing from the field after darkness.
Head and shoulders of a young man with a mustache, wearing a military cap and a jacket with three medals pinned to the left breast.	Elwood N. Williams	Army	Private	Company A, 28th Illinois Infantry Regiment	Shiloh, Tennessee	Apr 6, 1862	For extraordinary heroism on 6 April 1862, while serving with, in action at Shiloh, Tennessee. A box of ammunition having been abandoned between the lines, Private Williams voluntarily went forward with one companion, under a heavy fire from both armies, secured the box, and delivered it within the line of his regiment, his companion being mortally wounded.
—	George C. Williams	Army	Quartermaster Sergeant	1st Battalion, 14th Infantry Regiment (United States)	Battle of Gaines' Mill, Virginia	Jun 27, 1862	For extraordinary heroism on 27 June 1862, in action at Gaines Mill, Virginia. While on duty with the wagon train as Quartermaster Sergeant, George Williams voluntarily left his place of safety in the rear, joined a company, and fought with distinguished gallantry through the action.
—	John Williams	Navy	Boatswain's Mate	(United States Navy) USS Mohican	USS Mohican	November 7, 1861	For extraordinary heroism in action, serving as Captain of an 11-inch gun aboard the USS Mohican during action of the main squadron of ships against the heavily defended Forts Beauregard and Walker on Hilton Head, South Carolina, and against ships of the Confederate Fleet, 7 November 1861. Cool and courageous at his battle station, Boatswain's Mate Williams maintained steady fire against the enemy while under the fort batteries during a four-hour engagement which resulted in silencing the batteries of the forts and in the rout of the rebel steamers.
—	John Williams	Navy	Captain of the Maintop	(United States Navy) USS Pawnee	USS Pawnee	June 27, 1861	For extraordinary heroism in action, serving as captain of the Maintop of the USS Pawnee in the attack upon Mathias Point, Virginia, 26 June 1861. Captain of the Maintop Williams told his men, while lying off in the boat, that every man must die on his thwart sooner than leave a man behind. Although wounded by a musket ball in the thigh, he retained charge of his boat; and when the staff was shot away, held the stump in his hand, with the flag, until alongside the Freeborn.
—	John Williams	Navy	Seaman	(United States Navy) USS Commodore Perry	USS Commodore Perry	October 3, 1862	For extraordinary heroism in action while serving on board the USS Commodore Perry in the attack upon Franklin, Virginia, 3 October 1862. With enemy fire raking the deck of his ship and blockades thwarting her progress, Seaman Williams remained at his post and performed his duties with skill and courage as the Commodore Perry fought a gallant battle to silence many rebel batteries as she steamed down the Blackwater River.
	Le Roy Williams	Army	Sergeant	(New York (state)) Company G, 8th New York Heavy Artillery Regiment	Battle of Cold Harbor, Virginia	Jun 3, 1864	For extraordinary heroism on 3 June 1864, in action at Cold Harbor, Virginia. Sergeant Williams voluntarily exposed himself to the fire of the enemy's sharpshooters and located the body of his colonel who had been killed close to the enemy's lines. Under cover of darkness, with four companions, he recovered the body and brought it within the Union lines, having approached within a few feet of the Confederate pickets while so engaged. Grave is located at Oakwood Cemetery (Niagara Falls, New York)
Medal of Honor winner	Peter Williams	Navy	Seaman	(United States Navy) USS Monitor	USS Monitor	March 9, 1862	For extraordinary heroism in action while serving on board the USS Monitor, Hampton Roads, Virginia, 9 March 1862. During the engagement between the USS Monitor and the CSS Merrimack, Seaman Williams gallantly served throughout the engagement as Quartermaster, piloting the Monitor throughout the battle in which the Merrimack, after being damaged, retired from the scene of the battle.
—	Robert Williams	Navy	Signal Quartermaster	(United States Navy) USS Benton	USS Benton	Dec 23, 1862 – Dec 27, 1862	For extraordinary heroism in action while serving as Quartermaster on board the USS Benton during the Yazoo River (Mississippi) Expedition, 23 to 27 December 1862. Taking part in the hour-and-a-half engagement with the enemy at Drumgould's Bluff, 27 December, Signal Quartermaster Williams served courageously throughout that battle against hostile forces in which the enemy had the dead range of the vessel and were punishing her with heavy fire and, for various other action in which he took part during the Yazoo River Expedition.
—	William Williams	Navy	Landsman	(United States Navy) USS Lehigh	USS Lehigh	November 16, 1863	For extraordinary heroism in action while serving on board the USS Lehigh, Charleston Harbor, South Carolina, 16 November 1863, during the hazardous task of freeing the Lehigh, which had been grounded, and was under heavy enemy fire from Fort Moultrie. After several previous attempts had been made, Landsman Williams succeeded in passing in a small boat from the Lehigh to the Nahant with a line bent on a hawser. This courageous action while under severe enemy fire enabled the Lehigh to be freed from her helpless position.
—	William Haliday Williams	Army	Private	Company C, 82nd Ohio Infantry	Battle of Peachtree Creek, Georgia	Jul 20, 1864	For extraordinary heroism on 20 July 1864, in action at Peach Tree Creek, Georgia. Private Williams voluntarily went beyond the lines to observe the enemy; also aided a wounded comrade.
Profile of a white man with curly hair, a receding hairline, and a full beard, wearing a suit coat over a shirt and tie.	James A. Williamson	Army	Colonel	4th Iowa Volunteer Infantry Regiment	Battle of Chickasaw Bayou, Mississippi	Dec 29, 1862	For extraordinary heroism on 29 December 1862, in action at Chickasaw Bayou, Mississippi. Colonel Williamson led his regiment against a superior force, strongly entrenched, and held his ground when all support had been withdrawn.
—	Richard Willis	Navy	Coxswain	(United States Navy) USS New Ironsides	USS New Ironsides First and Second Battle of Fort Fisher, North Carolina	Dec 1864 and Jan 1865	For extraordinary heroism in action while serving on board the USS New Ironsides during action in several attacks on Fort Fisher, North Carolina, 24 and 25 December 1864; and 13, 14 and 15 January 1865. The ship steamed in and took the lead in the ironclad division close inshore and immediately opened its starboard battery in a barrage of well-directed fire to cause several fires and explosions and dismount several guns during the first two days of fighting. Taken under fire as she steamed into position on 13 January, the New Ironsides fought all day and took on ammunition at night, despite severe weather conditions. When the enemy troops came out of their bombproofs to defend the fort against the storming party, the ship's battery disabled nearly every gun on the fort facing the shore before the ceasefire order was given by the flagship.
A white man with a thin mustache, wearing a military jacket and a forage cap low over his eyes. His side is turned to the camera and his is tending to a horse.	Edward B. Williston	Army	First Lieutenant	(United States) Battery D, 2nd Regiment of Artillery	Battle of Trevilian Station, Virginia	Jun 12, 1864	For distinguished gallantry on 12 June 1864, in action at Trevilian Station, Virginia.
—	Charles E. Wilson	Army	Sergeant	Company A, 1st New Jersey Cavalry	Battle of Sayler's Creek, Virginia	Apr 6, 1865	For extraordinary heroism on 6 April 1865, in action at Deatonsville (Sailor's Creek), Virginia. Sergeant Wilson charged the enemy's works, colors in hand, and had two horses shot from under him.
—	Christopher W. Wilson	Army	Private	(New York (state)) Company E, 73rd New York Infantry	Battle of Spotsylvania Court House, Virginia	May 12, 1864	For extraordinary heroism on 12 May 1864, in action at Spotsylvania, Virginia. Private Wilson took the flag from the wounded Color Bearer and carried it in the charge over the Confederate works, in which charge he also captured the colors of the 56th Virginia (Confederate States of America) bringing off both flags in safety.
—	Francis A. Wilson	Army	Corporal	Company B, 95th Pennsylvania Infantry	Third Battle of Petersburg, Virginia	Apr 2, 1865	For extraordinary heroism on 2 April 1865, in action at Petersburg, Virginia. Corporal Wilson was among the first to penetrate the enemy's lines and himself captured a gun of the two batteries captured.
—	John Wilson	Army	Sergeant	Company L, 1st New Jersey Cavalry	Chamberlains Creek, Virginia	Mar 31, 1865	For extraordinary heroism on 31 March 1865, in action at Chamberlain's Creek, Virginia. With the assistance of one comrade, Sergeant Wilson headed off the advance of the enemy, shooting two of his Color Bearers; also posted himself between the enemy and the lead horses of his own command, thus saving the herd from capture.
Head of a white man with a goatee, wearing a flat cap and a high-collared jacket with a bowtie.	John A. Wilson	Army	Private	Company G, 21st Ohio Infantry	Great Locomotive Chase, Georgia	Apr 1862	For extraordinary heroism on April, 1862, in action during the Andrew's Raid in Georgia. Private Wilson was one of the 19 of 22 men (including two civilians) who, by direction of General Mitchell (or Buell), penetrated nearly 200 miles/200 miles (320 km) south into enemy territory and captured a railroad train at Big Shanty, Georgia, and attempted to destroy the bridges and track between Chattanooga and Atlanta.
Head of a white man with a full bushy beard, wearing a cavalry hat and a military jacket with a single button buttoned near the neck.	John M. Wilson	Army	First Lieutenant	(United States) U.S. Engineers	Battle of Malvern Hill, Virginia	Aug 6, 1862	For extraordinary heroism on 6 August 1862, in action at Malvern Hill, Virginia. First Lieutenant Wilson remained on duty, while suffering from an acute illness and very weak, and participated in the action of that date. A few days previous he had been transferred to a staff corps, but preferred to remain until the close of the campaign, taking part in several actions.
Medal of Honor winner	William W. Winegar	Army	First Lieutenant	(New York (state)) Company B, 19th New York Cavalry (1st New York Dragoons)	Battle of Five Forks, Virginia	Apr 1, 1865	For extraordinary heroism on 1 April 1865, while serving with, in action at Five Forks, Virginia. While advancing in front of his company and alone, First Lieutenant Winegar found himself surrounded by the enemy. He accosted a nearby enemy flag-bearer demanding the surrender of the group. His effective firing of one shot so demoralized the unit that it surrendered with flag.
—	Edward Van Winkle	Army	Corporal	(New York (state)) Company C, 148th New York Volunteer Infantry	Battle of Chaffin's Farm, Virginia	Sep 29, 1864	First name given as "Edwin" in some records. Took position in advance of the skirmish line and drove the enemy's cannoneers from their guns.
Medal of Honor winner	Lewis S. Wisner	Army	First Lieutenant	(New York (state)) Company K, 124th New York Volunteer Infantry Regiment	Battle of Spotsylvania Court House, Virginia	May 12, 1864	For extraordinary heroism on 12 May 1864, in action at Spotsylvania, Virginia, while serving as an engineer officer voluntarily exposed himself to the enemy's fire.
Medal of Honor winner	William H. Withington	Army	Captain	Company B, 1st Michigan Infantry	First Battle of Bull Run, Virginia	Jul 21, 1861	For extraordinary heroism on 21 July 1861, while serving with, in action at Bull Run, Virginia. Captain Withington remained on the field under heavy fire to succor his superior officer.
Head and shoulders of a white man with a long goatee, wearing a vest and suit coat with a flower pinned to the lapel.	John Wollam	Army	Private	Company G, 21st Ohio Infantry	Great Locomotive Chase, Georgia	Apr 1862	For extraordinary heroism on April, 1862, in action during the Andrew's Raid in Georgia. Private Wilson was one of the 19 of 22 men (including two civilians) who, by direction of General Mitchell (or Buell), penetrated nearly 200 miles/200 miles (320 km) south into enemy territory and captured a railroad train at Big Shanty, Georgia, and attempted to destroy the bridges and track between Chattanooga and Atlanta.
Medal of Honor winner	Henry Clay Wood	Army	First Lieutenant	(United States) 11th U.S. Infantry	Battle of Wilson's Creek, Missouri	Aug 10, 1861	For distinguished gallantry on 10 August 1861, in action at Wilson's Creek, Missouri.
Head and shoulders of a white man with a Van Dyke mustache and curly hair, wearing a military jacket with a star-shaped medal pinned to the left breast.	Mark Wood	Army	Private	Company G, 21st Ohio Infantry	Great Locomotive Chase, Georgia	Apr 1862	For extraordinary heroism on April, 1862, in action during the Andrew's Raid in Georgia. Private Wilson was one of the 19 of 22 men (including two civilians) who, by direction of General Mitchell (or Buell), penetrated nearly 200 miles/200 miles (320 km) south into enemy territory and captured a railroad train at Big Shanty, Georgia, and attempted to destroy the bridges and track between Chattanooga and Atlanta.
—	Richard H. Wood	Army	Captain	Company A, 97th Illinois Infantry Regiment	Battle of Vicksburg, Mississippi	May 22, 1863	For extraordinary heroism on 22 May 1863, in action at Vicksburg, Mississippi. Captain Wood led the volunteer storming party, which made a most gallant assault upon the enemy's works.
—	Robert B. Wood	Navy	Coxswain	(United States Navy) USS Mount Washington	USS Mount Washington	April 14, 1863	For extraordinary heroism in action while attached to the USS Minnesota and temporarily serving on USS Mount Washington, during action against the enemy in the Nansemond River, Virginia, 14 April 1863. When the USS Mount Washington drifted against the bank and all men were driven from the decks by escaping steam following several successive hits which struck her boilers and stopped her engines, Coxswain Wood boarded the stricken vessel and, despite a strike on the head by a spent ball, continued at his gun for six hours as fierce artillery and musketry continued to rake her decks.
—	William H. Woodall	Army	Civilian scout	(United States) Army of the Shenandoah	Appomattox campaign	Mar 29, 1865 – Apr 9, 1865	For extraordinary heroism in action from March 29 to 9 April 1865, while serving as a Scout attached to the Federal Forces. At Deatonsville (Sailor's Creek), Virginia, he captured flag of Brigadier General Rufus Barringer's headquarters brigade.
Medal of Honor winner	Eri D. Woodbury	Army	Sergeant	Company E, 1st Vermont Cavalry	Battle of Cedar Creek, Virginia	Oct 19, 1864	For extraordinary heroism on 19 October 1864, in action at Cedar Creek, Virginia. During the regiment's charge when the enemy was in retreat Sergeant Woodbury encountered four Confederate infantrymen retreating. He drew his saber and ordered them to surrender, overcoming by his determined actions their willingness to further resist. They surrendered to him together with their rifles and 12th North Carolina (Confederate States of America) regimental flag.
Medal of Honor winner	Alonzo Woodruff	Army	Sergeant	Company I, 1st United States Sharpshooters	Battle of Boydton Plank Road, Petersburg, Virginia	Oct 27, 1864	For extraordinary heroism on 27 October 1864, in action at Hatcher's Run, Virginia. Sergeant Woodruff went to the assistance of a wounded and overpowered comrade, and in a hand-to-hand encounter effected his rescue.
Head of a clean-shaven young man leaning to the side and wearing a military jacket with a single button buttoned near the neck.	Carle A. Woodruff	Army	First Lieutenant	(United States) Battery M, 2nd Regiment of Artillery	Newbys Crossroads, Virginia	Jul 24, 1863	For extraordinary heroism on 24 July 1863, in action at Newbys Crossroads, Virginia. While in command of a section of a battery constituting a portion of the rear guard of a division then retiring before the advance of a corps of Infantry, First Lieutenant Woodruff was attacked by the enemy and ordered to abandon his guns. He disregarded the orders received and aided in repelling the attack and saving the guns.
—	Daniel A. Woods	Army	Private	Company K, 1st West Virginia Cavalry	Battle of Sayler's Creek, Virginia	Apr 6, 1865	For extraordinary heroism on 6 April 1865, in action at Deatonsville (Sailor's Creek), Virginia, for capture of flag of 18th Florida Infantry (Confederate States of America).
—	Samuel Woods	Navy	Seaman	(United States Navy) USS Mount Washington	USS Mount Washington	April 14, 1863	For extraordinary heroism in action while serving as Captain of the gun, serving temporarily on board the USS Mount Washington, during the Nansemond River (Virginia) action, 14 April 1863. When one of his comrades was struck by a bullet and knocked overboard, Seaman Woods fearlessly jumped into the water and swam after him. Before he reached him, the man sank beneath the surface and Woods promptly swam back to the vessel, went to his gun, and fought it to the close of the action. At the close of the battle, he tirelessly cared for the wounded.
Medal of Honor winner	Evan M. Woodward	Army	First Lieutenant and Adjutant	2nd Pennsylvania Reserve Regiment	Battle of Fredericksburg, Virginia	Dec 13, 1862	For extraordinary heroism on 13 December 1862, in action at Fredericksburg, Virginia. First Lieutenant Woodward advanced between the lines, demanded and received the surrender of the 19th Georgia Infantry and captured their battle flag.
—	John Woon	Navy	Boatswain's Mate	(United States Navy) USS Pittsburgh	USS Pittsburgh	April 29, 1863	For extraordinary heroism in action while serving on board the USS Pittsburgh, Mississippi River, 29 April 1863. Engaging the enemy batteries at Grand Gulf, the USS Pittsburgh, although severely damaged and suffering many personnel casualties, continued to fire her batteries until ordered to withdraw. Taking part in a similar action after nightfall, the USS Pittsburgh received further damage, but receiving no personnel casualties in the latter action. Boatswain's Mate Woon showed courage and devotion to duty throughout these bitter engagements.
—	Charles B. Woram	Navy	Seaman	(United States Navy) USS Oneida	USS OneidaFort Morgan, Battle of Mobile Bay, Alabama	Aug 5, 1864	For extraordinary heroism in action while serving on board the USS Oneida in the engagement at Mobile Bay, Alabama, 5 August 1864. Acting as an aid to the executive officer, Seaman Woram carried orders intelligently and correctly, distinguishing himself by his cool courage throughout the battle which resulted in the capture of the rebel ram Tennessee and the damaging of Fort Morgan.
Medal of Honor winner	Joseph Wortick	Army	Private	Company A, 6th Missouri Infantry	Battle of Vicksburg, Mississippi	May 22, 1863	for gallantry in the charge of the volunteer storming party on 22 May 1863, in action at Vicksburg, Mississippi. Last name sometimes spelled "Wertick"
Medal of Honor winner	William J. Wray	Army	Sergeant	(United States) Company K, 1st Veteran Reserve Corps	Battle of Fort Stevens, District of Columbia	Jul 12, 1864	for extraordinary heroism on 12 July 1864, in action at Fort Stevens, Washington, D.C. Sergeant Wray rallied the company at a critical moment during a change of position under fire.
Medal of Honor winner	Albert D. Wright	Army	Captain	(United States) Company G, 43rd U.S. Colored Troops	Battle of the Crater, Petersburg, Virginia	Jul 30, 1864	For extraordinary heroism on 30 July 1864, in action at Petersburg, Virginia. Captain Wright advanced beyond the enemy's lines, capturing a stand of colors and its color guard; was severely wounded.
—	Edward Wright	Navy	Quartermaster	(United States Navy) USS Cayuga	USS Cayuga	Apr 24, 1862 – Apr 25, 1862	On board USS Cayuga during the capture of Forts St. Philip and Jackson and the taking of New Orleans, 24 and 25 April 1862.
—	Robert Wright	Army	Private	Company G, 14th U.S. Infantry	Chapel House, Farm, Virginia	Oct 1, 1864	For gallantry in action on 1 October 1864, at Chapel House Farm, Virginia.
—	Samuel Wright	Army	Corporal	Company H, 2nd Minnesota Infantry Regiment	Nolensville, Tennessee	Feb 15, 1863	for extraordinary heroism on 15 February 1863, in action at Nolensville, Tennessee. Corporal Wright was one of a detachment of 16 men who heroically defended a wagon train against the attack of 125 cavalry, repulsed the attack and saved the train.
	Samuel C. Wright	Army	Private	Company E, 29th Massachusetts Infantry	Battle of Antietam, Maryland	Sep 17, 1862	For extraordinary heroism on 17 September 1862, in action at Antietam, Maryland. Private Wright voluntarily advanced under a destructive fire and removed a fence which would have impeded a contemplated charge.
—	William Wright (Medal of Honor recipient)	Navy	Yeoman	(United States Navy) USS Monticello	USS Monticello	Jun 23, 1864 – Jun 25, 1864	For extraordinary heroism in action while serving as Yeoman on board the USS Monticello during the reconnaissance of the harbor and water defenses of Wilmington, North Carolina, 23 to 25 June 1864. Taking part in a reconnaissance of enemy defenses which covered a period of two days and nights, Yeoman Wright courageously carried out his cutting of a telegraph wire and the capture of a large group of prisoners. Although in immediate danger from the enemy at all times, Wright showed gallantry and coolness throughout this action which resulted in the gaining of much vital information of the rebel defenses.

== Y ==
Recipients are listed alphabetically by last name. Posthumous receipt is denoted by an asterisk.

This along with the *, indicates that the Medal of Honor was awarded posthumously

Image	Name	Service	Rank	Unit/command	Place of action	Date of action	Notes
Medal of Honor winner	Jacob F. Yeager	Army	Private	Company H, 101st Ohio Infantry	Buzzard's Roost, Georgia	May 11, 1864	For extraordinary heroism on 11 May 1864, in action at Buzzard's Roost, Georgia. Private Yeager seized a shell with fuze burning that had fallen in the ranks of his company and threw it into a stream, thereby probably saving his comrades from injury.
—	Andrew J. Young	Army	Sergeant	Company F, 1st Pennsylvania Cavalry Regiment	Paines Crossroads, Virginia	Apr 5, 1865	For extraordinary heroism on 5 April 1865, in action at Paines Crossroads, Virginia, for capture of flag.
Medal of Honor winner	Benjamin F. Young	Army	Corporal	1st Michigan Sharpshooters	Second Battle of Petersburg, Virginia	Jun 17, 1864	For extraordinary heroism on 17 June 1864, in action at Petersburg, Virginia, for capture of flag of 35th North Carolina Infantry (Confederate States of America).
Medal of Honor winner	Calvary M. Young	Army	Sergeant	Company L, 3rd Iowa Volunteer Cavalry Regiment	Osage, Kansas	Oct 25, 1864	For extraordinary heroism on 25 October 1864, while serving with, in action at Osage, Kansas, for gallantry in capturing General Cabell.
—	Edward B. Young	Navy	Coxswain	(United States Navy) USS Galena	Aboard USS Galena, Battle of Mobile Bay	Aug 5, 1864	For extraordinary heroism in action while serving on board the USS Galena during the attack on enemy forts at Mobile Bay, Alabama, 5 August 1864. Securely lashed to the side of the USS Oneida (1861) which had suffered the loss of her steering apparatus and an explosion of her boiler from enemy fire, the Galena aided the stricken vessel past the enemy forts to safety. Despite heavy damage to his ship from raking enemy fire, Coxswain Young performed his duties with skill and courage throughout the action.
Medal of Honor winner	Horatio N. Young	Navy	Seaman	(United States Navy) USS Lehigh	Aboard USS Lehigh, Charleston Harbor	Nov 16, 1863	For extraordinary heroism in action while serving on board the USS Lehigh, Charleston Harbor, South Carolina, 16 November 1863, during the hazardous task of freeing the Lehigh, which had grounded, and was under heavy enemy fire from Fort Moultrie. After several previous attempts had been made, Seaman Young succeeded in passing in a small boat from the Lehigh to the Nahant with a line bent on a hawser. This courageous action while under severe enemy fire enabled the Lehigh to be freed from her helpless position.
Medal of Honor winner	James M. Young	Army	Private	(New York (state)) Company B, 72nd New York Volunteer Infantry Regiment	Battle of Wilderness, Virginia	May 6, 1864	For extraordinary heroism on 6 May 1864, in action during the Wilderness Campaign, Virginia. With two companions, Private Young voluntarily went forward in the forest to reconnoiter the enemy's position, was fired upon and one of his companions disabled. Private Young took the wounded man upon his back and, under fire, carried him within the Union lines.
Medal of Honor winner	William Young	Navy	Boatswain's Mate	(United States Navy) USS Cayuga	Aboard USS Cayuga, Battle of Forts Jackson and St. Philip	April 24, 1862 – April 25, 1862	For extraordinary heroism in action while serving on board the USS Cayuga during the capture of Forts St. Philip and Jackson, Louisiana, and the taking of New Orleans, 24 and 25 April 1862. As his ship led the advance column toward the barrier and both forts opened fire simultaneously, striking the vessel from stem to stern, Boatswain's Mate Young calmly manned a Parrot gun throughout the action in which attempts by three rebel steamers to butt and board were thwarted and the ships driven off or captured, 11 gunboats were successfully engaged and garrisons forced to surrender. During the battle, the Cayuga sustained 46 hits.
Head of a white man with a Van Dyke mustache and goatee, wearing a cap tilted on his head and a military jacket buttoned only at the neck.	John L. Younker	Army	Private	(United States) Company A, 12th U.S. Infantry	Battle of Cedar Mountain, Virginia	Aug 9, 1862	For extraordinary heroism on 9 August 1862, in action at Cedar Mountain, Virginia. Private Younker voluntarily carried an order, at great risk of life in the face of a fire of grape and canister; in doing this he was wounded.

== See also ==
- List of Medal of Honor recipients
