= William L. S. Tabor =

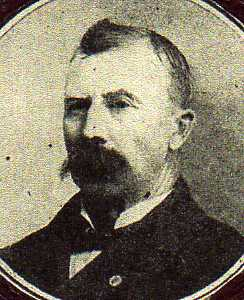
- Born: June 2, 1843; Metheun, Massachusetts
- Died: December 15, 1921 (aged 78)
- Burial place: East Derry, New Hampshire
- Military career
- Allegiance: United States of America
- Branch: United States Army
- Rank: Private
- Units: Company K, 15th New Hampshire Infantry
- Awards: Medal of Honor

Private William L. S. Tabor (June 2, 1843 – December 15, 1921) was an American soldier who fought in the American Civil War. Tabor received his country's highest award for bravery during combat, the Medal of Honor, for his action in the Siege of Port Hudson in Port Hudson, Louisiana, in July 1863. He was honored with the award on 10 March 1896.

== Biography ==
Tabor was born in Metheun, Massachusetts, on June 2, 1843. He enlisted into the 15th New Hampshire Infantry's K Company. He died on December 15, 1921, and he is buried in East Derry, New Hampshire.

== Medal of Honor citation ==
Citation: Voluntarily exposed himself to the enemy only a few feet away to render valuable services for the protection of his comrades.

== See also ==
- List of American Civil War Medal of Honor recipients: T–Z
