= William H. Woodall =

- Born: Lynchburg, Virginia
- Military career
- Allegiance: United States
- Branch: United States Army (civilian employee)
- Rank: Chief Civilian Scout
- Unit: Jessie Scouts
- Conflicts: American Civil War: Battle of Namozine Church
- Awards: Medal of Honor

William H. Woodall was a civilian employee of the Union Army during the American Civil War and a recipient of the U.S. military's highest decoration, the Medal of Honor, for his actions at the Battle of Namozine Church. He is one of only a handful of civilians to have received the medal.

Born in Lynchburg, Virginia, Woodall was living in Winchester, Virginia, when he was hired by the U.S. Army. He served as the Chief Civilian Scout for Major General Philip Sheridan's Cavalry Corps and rode with the Jessie Scouts, an irregular group of spies which infiltrated Southern territory by dressing in Confederate uniforms. During the Battle of Namozine Church, Virginia, on April 3, 1865, he was among a group of Jessie Scouts that captured Confederate Brigadier General Rufus Barringer. Woodall himself seized the general's headquarters flag, for which he was formally presented with the Medal of Honor a month later, on May 3, 1865, in Washington, D.C.

Woodall's official Medal of Honor citation reads:

Captured flag of Brigadier General Rufus Barringer's headquarters brigade.

A 1916 review of all Medals of Honor awarded by the Army resulted in the revocation of 900 medals, including Woodall's. He and four other civilian scouts had their awards rescinded due to their civilian status. In June 1989, the U.S. Army Board of Correction of Records restored the medal to all five of these men.

The flag which Woodall captured is now held by the North Carolina Museum of History.

== See also ==
- List of American Civil War Medal of Honor recipients: T–Z
