= Jacob R. Tucker =

American soldier

Jacob. Ruth Tucker
- Born: April 1, 1845; Chester County, Pennsylvania, US
- Died: February 16, 1926 (aged 80); Baltimore, Maryland, US
- Military career
- Allegiance: United States
- Branch: United States Army; Union Army
- Rank: Corporal
- Units: Company G, 4th Maryland Infantry
- Conflicts: Battle of Gettysburg
- Awards: Medal of Honor

Jacob. Ruth Tucker (April 1, 1845 – February 16, 1926) was an American soldier who fought in the American Civil War. Tucker received his country's highest award for bravery during combat, the Medal of Honor. Tucker's medal was won for his heroism at the Third Battle of Petersburg in Virginia on April 1, 1865. He was honored with the award on April 22, 1871.

Tucker died in Baltimore, Maryland, in 1926.

== Medal of Honor citation ==
The President of the United States of America, in the name of Congress, takes pleasure in presenting the Medal of Honor to Corporal Jacob R. Tucker, United States Army, for extraordinary heroism on 1 April 1865, while serving with Company G, 4th Maryland Infantry, in action at Petersburg, Virginia. Corporal Tucker was one of the three soldiers most conspicuous in the final assault.

== See also ==
- List of American Civil War Medal of Honor recipients: T–Z
