= Howell B. Treat =

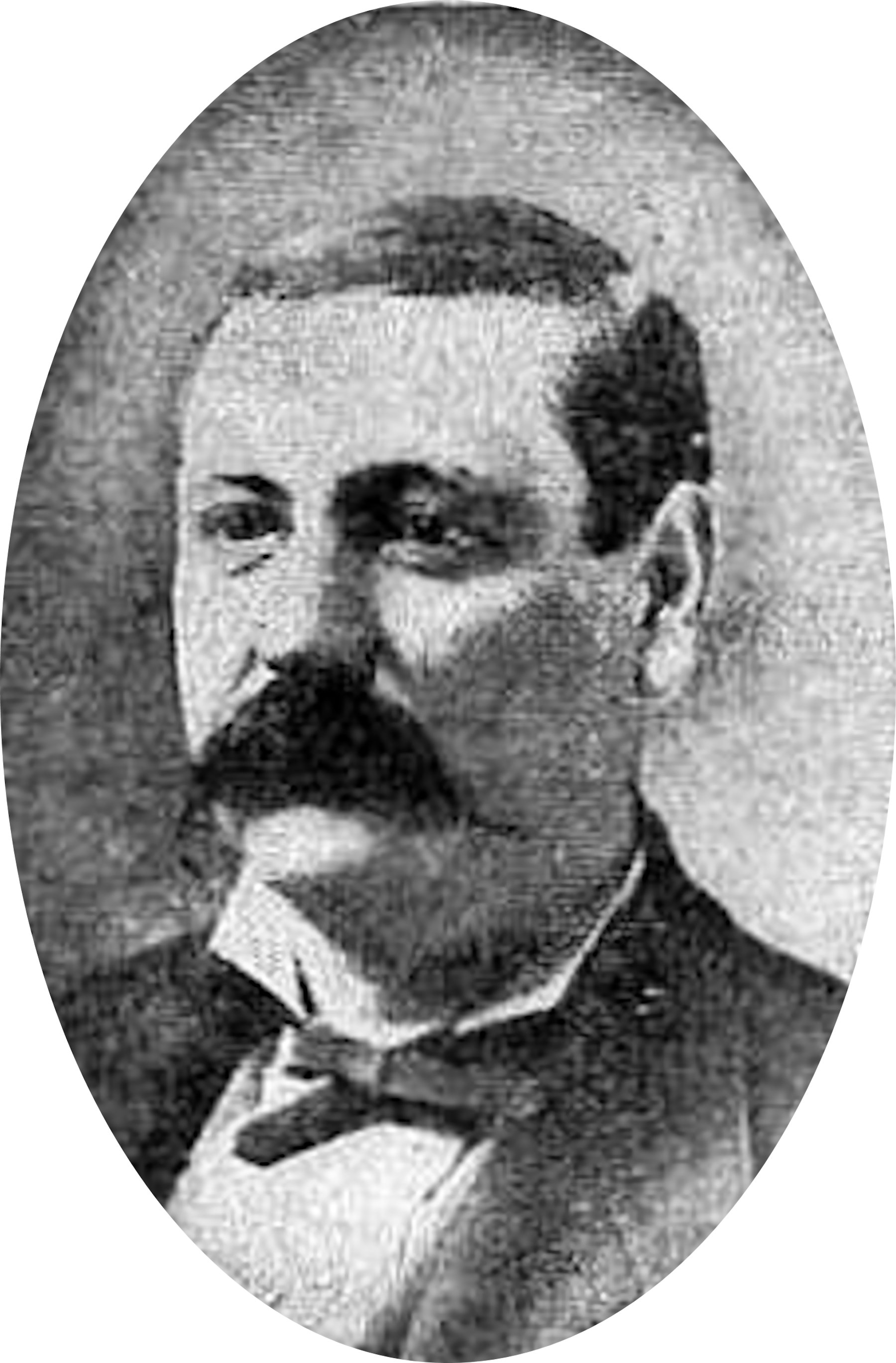
- Born: March 31, 1833; Connecticut
- Died: July 21, 1912 (aged 79); Painesville, Ohio
- Burial place: Painesville, Ohio
- Military career
- Allegiance: United States of America
- Branch: United States Army
- Rank: Sergeant
- Units: Company I, 52nd Ohio Infantry
- Conflicts: American Civil War
- Awards: Medal of Honor

Howell B. Treat (March 31, 1833 – July 21, 1912) was an American soldier who fought in the American Civil War. He received his country's highest award for bravery during combat, the Medal of Honor. Treat's medal was won when he risked his life to save a wounded comrade at Buzzard's Roost on May 11, 1864. He was honored with the award on February 20, 1884.

Treat was born in Connecticut. He came to Claridon Twp., Geauga County, Ohio as a baby, and entered service from there. He was buried in Painesville, Ohio.

== Medal of Honor citation ==
The President of the United States of America, in the name of Congress, takes pleasure in presenting the Medal of Honor to Sergeant Howell B. Treat, United States Army, for extraordinary heroism on 11 May 1864, while serving with Company I, 52d Ohio Infantry, in action at Buzzard's Roost, Georgia. Sergeant Treat risked his life in saving a wounded comrade.

== See also ==
- List of American Civil War Medal of Honor recipients: T–Z
