= Benjamin Thackrah =

Scottish soldier

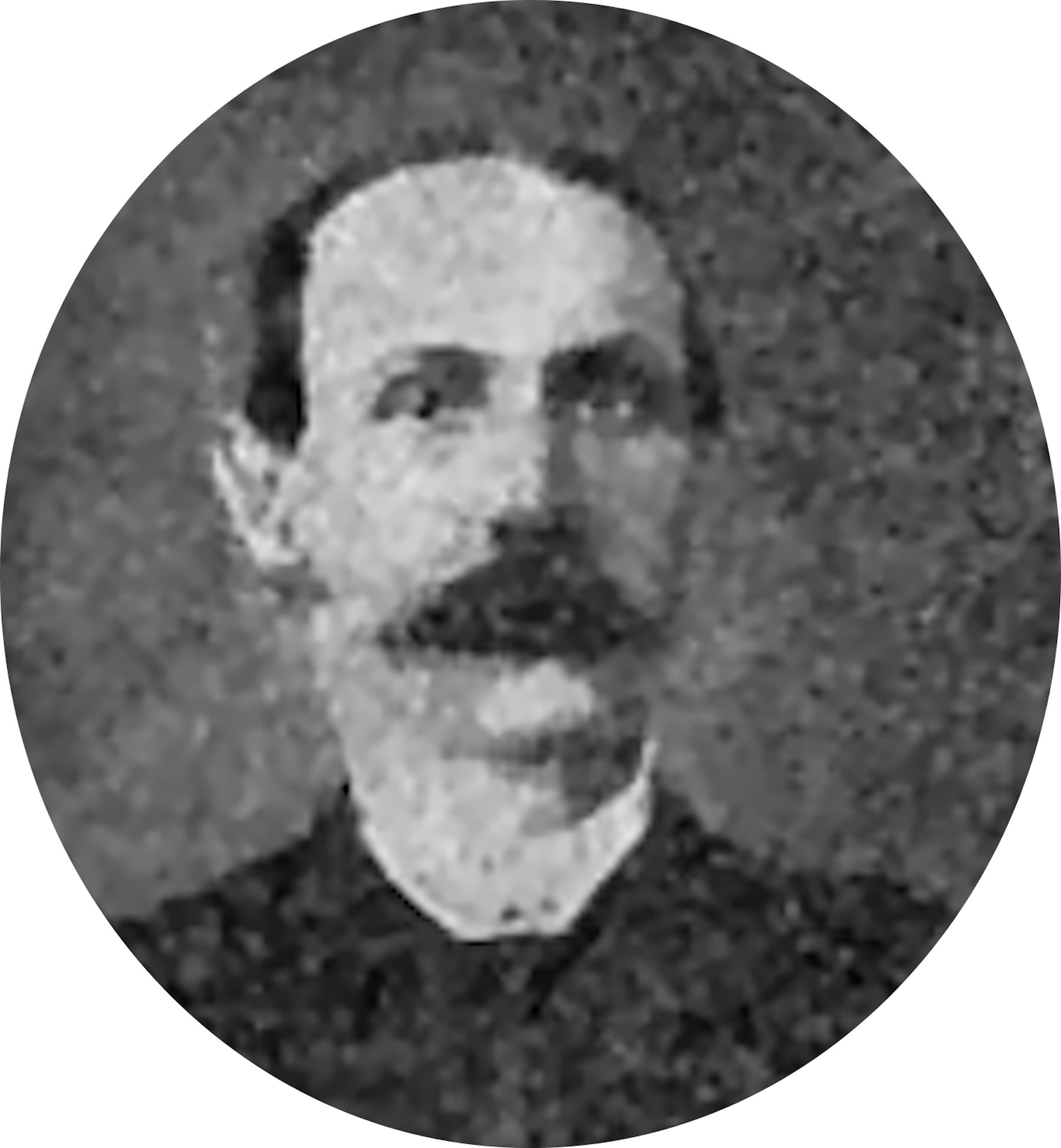
- Born: August 13, 1845; Scotland
- Died: May 20, 1912 (aged 66)
- Burial place: Saint Mary's Cemetery, Fort Johnson, New York
- Military career
- Allegiance: United States of America
- Branch: United States Army; Union Army
- Rank: Private
- Unit: 115th New York Infantry
- Conflicts: Fort Gates, Florida
- Awards: Medal of Honor

Benjamin Thackrah (August 13, 1845 – May 20, 1912) was a Scottish soldier who fought for the Union Army during the American Civil War. He received the Medal of Honor for valor.

== Biography ==
Thackrah served in the American Civil War in the 115th New York Infantry. He received the Medal of Honor on May 2, 1890, for his actions near Fort Gates, Florida, on April 1, 1864.

== Medal of Honor citation ==
Citation:

Was a volunteer in the surprise and capture of the enemy's picket.

== See also ==
- List of American Civil War Medal of Honor recipients: T-Z
