= Henry H. Taylor =

American soldier who fought in the American Civil War

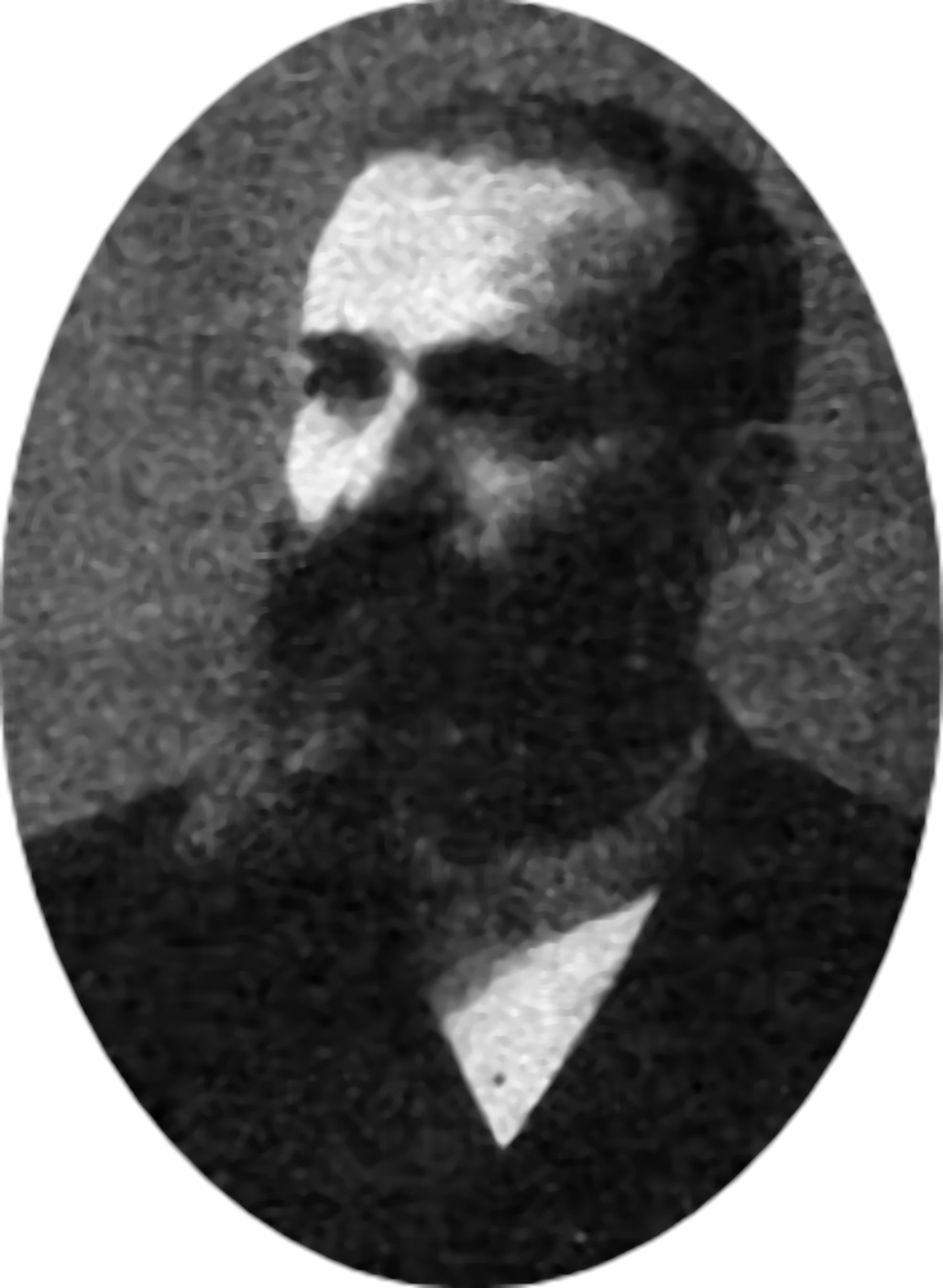
- Born: July 4, 1841; Galena, Illinois
- Died: May 3, 1909 (aged 67)
- Burial place: Clay Center, Kansas
- Military career
- Allegiance: United States of America
- Branch: United States Army
- Rank: Sergeant
- Units: Company C, 45th Illinois Infantry
- Awards: Medal of Honor

Sergeant Henry H. Taylor (July 4, 1841 – May 3, 1909) was an American soldier who fought in the American Civil War. Clark received his country's highest award for bravery during combat, the Medal of Honor, for his action during the Battle of Vicksburg in Mississippi on June 25, 1863. He was honored with the award on 1 September 1893.

== Biography ==
Taylor was born in Galena, Illinois, on July 4, 1841. He enlisted into the 45th Illinois Infantry C Company, entering service in Galena, Jo Daviess County, Illinois. He died on May 3, 1909, and he is buried in Clay Center, Kansas.

== Medal of Honor citation ==
Citation: Was the first to plant the Union colors upon the enemy's works.

== See also ==
- List of American Civil War Medal of Honor recipients: T–Z
