= Andrew J. Widick =

American Medal of Honor recipient (1842–1929)

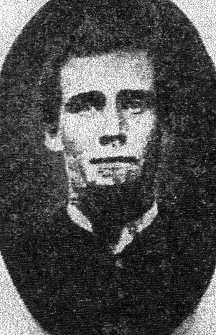
- Born: March 27, 1842; Macon County, Illinois, US
- Died: January 24, 1929 (aged 86); Bertrand, Nebraska, US
- Military career
- Branch: Union Army
- Unit: 116th Illinois Infantry Regiment
- Conflicts: American Civil War
- Awards: Medal of Honor

Andrew Widick (March 27, 1842 – January 24, 1929) was an American Medal of Honor recipient who fought in the American Civil War.

== Biography ==
Andrew Widick was born on March 27, 1842, in Macon County, Illinois. He joined the 116th Illinois Infantry Regiment and fought as a private during the war. He earned his Medal of Honor at the Battle of Vicksburg in Mississippi, on May 22, 1863. He died January 24, 1929, in Bertrand, Nebraska, and is now buried there in Highland Cemetery.

== Medal of Honor Citation ==
For gallantry in the charge of the volunteer storming party on 22 May 1863, in action at Vicksburg, Mississippi.
