= Henry C. Weir =

American soldier

Henry Weir (August 22, 1840 – April 22, 1927) was an American soldier who was awarded the Medal of Honor for his actions in the American Civil War. Weir was presented his medal on 18 May, 1899 for his actions as a captain in the U.S Volunteers at St. Mary's Church, Virginia on Jun 24, 1864.

He later served as an assistant adjutant general with the rank of major and was breveted to the rank of lieutenant colonel. After the war, he became a companion of the New York Commandery of the Military Order of the Loyal Legion of the United States.

He was born in West Point, New York and died in Warwick, New York.

He is buried in The Green-Wood Wood Cemetery in Brooklyn, New York.

== Medal of Honor Citation ==
The division being hard pressed and falling back, this officer dismounted, gave his horse to a wounded officer, and thus enabled him to escape. Afterwards, on foot, Captain Weir rallied and took command of some stragglers and helped to repel the last charge of the enemy.
