= Leander A. Wilkins =

American Union soldier during Civil War

Leander Wilkins (b. 1843, Lancaster, New Hampshire) was an American soldier who was awarded the Medal of Honor during the American Civil War. Little is known about Wilkins except for his Medal of Honor date and related information. He served in the 9th New Hampshire Volunteer Infantry Regiment as a sergeant and earned his medal on Jul 30, 1864 at the Battle of the Crater, Petersburg, Virginia.

== Medal of Honor Citation ==
For extraordinary heroism on 30 July 1864, in action at Petersburg, Virginia. Sergeant Wilkins recaptured the colors of 21st Massachusetts Infantry in a hand-to-hand encounter.
