= Clifford Thomson =

US Medal of Honor recipient

Clifford Thomson (April 15, 1834 - September 29, 1912) was an American soldier who fought as a First Lieutenant with the 1st New York Cavalry in the American Civil War. He was awarded the medal for actions at the Battle of Chancellorsville.

Thomson was later promoted to major and reassigned to the 5th United States Colored Cavalry.

After the war, he became a companion of the New York Commandery of the Military Order of the Loyal Legion of the United States.

Thomson was born in Fulton, Oswego County, New York and was buried in Holy Sepulchre, St. John & Paul Cemetery in East Orange, New Jersey.

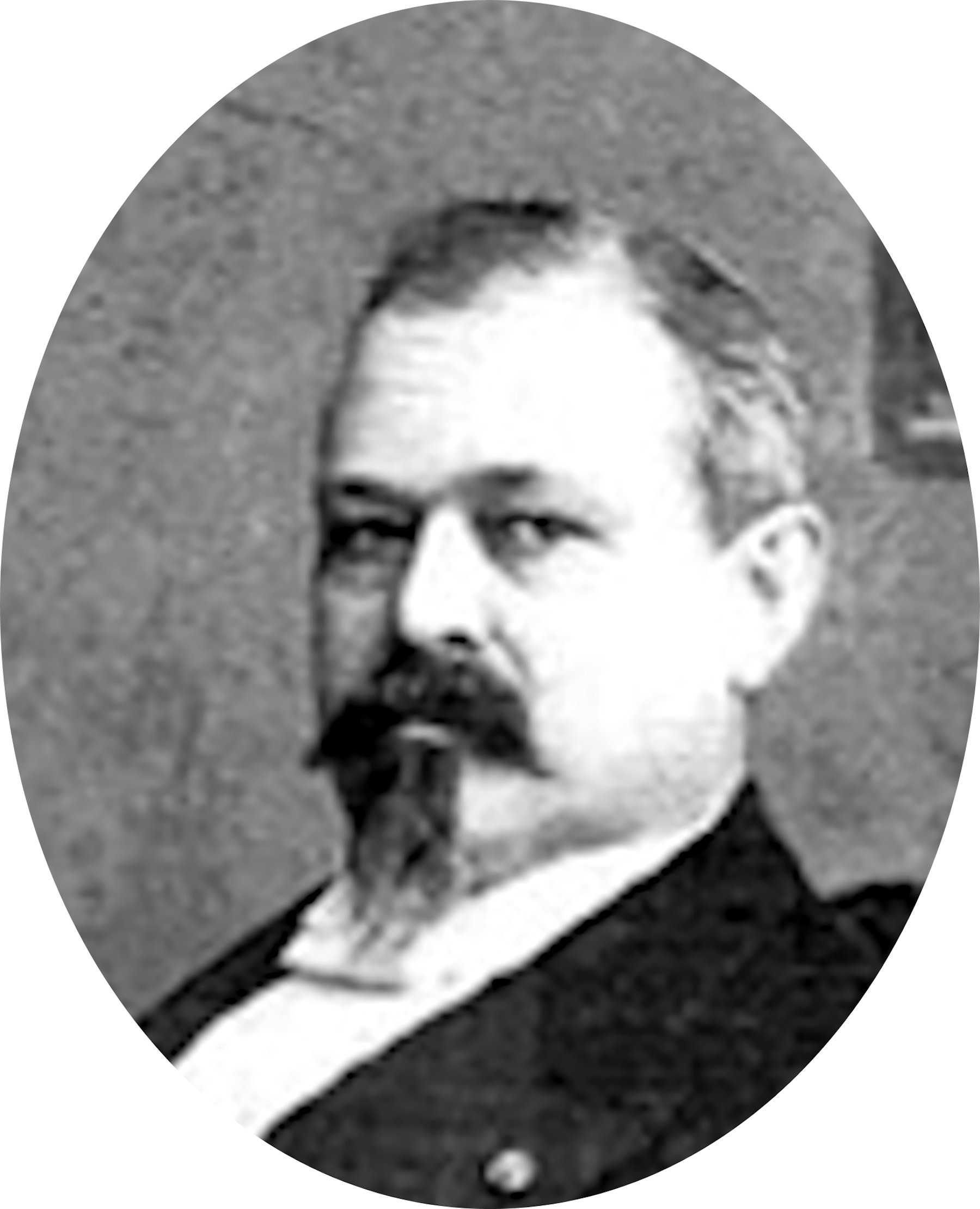

== Medal of Honor Citation ==
Volunteered to ascertain the character of approaching troops; rode up so closely as to distinguish the features of the enemy, and as he wheeled to return they opened fire with musketry, the Union troops returning same. Under a terrific fire from both sides Lieutenant Thomson rode back unhurt to the Federal lines, averting a disaster to the Army by his heroic act.

Date Issued: 27 November, 1897
