= Richard Welch (Medal of Honor) =

American Union soldier during Civil War

Richard Welch (c. 1828 - March 13, 1894) was an Irish born soldier who fought in the Union Army during the American Civil War. He was awarded the Medal of Honor on 10 May 1865 for actions as a corporal with the 37th Massachusetts Infantry Regiment at the Third Battle of Petersburg, Virginia on 2, April, 1865. Richard Welch is buried where he died in Williamstown, Massachusetts in the Eastlawn Cemetery.

== Medal of Honor Citation ==
For extraordinary heroism on 2 April 1865, in action at Petersburg, Virginia, for capture of flag.
