= Alason P. Webber =

American Union soldier during Civil War

Alason P. Webber (March 16, 1828 – July 27, 1902) was an American musician and soldier who served in the Union Army during the American Civil War. He was awarded the Medal of Honor on 22 June, 1896 for actions as a musician with the 86th Illinois Infantry Regiment at Kenesaw Mountain, Georgia on 27 June, 1864. He was born in Greene County, New York and died in Henry, Illinois where he is buried at the Saratoga Methodist Church Cemetery.

== Medal of Honor Citation ==
Voluntarily joined in a charge against the enemy, which was repulsed, and by his rapid firing in the face of the enemy enabled many of the wounded to return to the Federal lines; with others, held the advance of the enemy while temporary works were being constructed.
