= Elwood N. Williams =

American recipient of the Medal of Honor (1842–1921)

- Born: November 12, 1842; Philadelphia, Pennsylvania, U.S.
- Died: March 8, 1921 (aged 78)
- Buried: West Laurel Hill Cemetery, Bala Cynwyd, Pennsylvania, U.S.
- Allegiance: United States
- Branch: Army
- Conflicts: Battle of Shiloh
- Awards: Medal of Honor

Elwood N. Williams (November 12, 1842 – March 8, 1921) was an American recipient of the Medal of Honor for actions during the American Civil War.

== Biography ==
Elwood Williams was born November 12, 1842, in Philadelphia, Pennsylvania. He fought as a private in the 28th Illinois Infantry Regiment. He participated in the Battle of Shiloh, which is where he earned his medal on April 6, 1862. His medal was presented to him on September 28, 1897. He died on March 8, 1921, and is now buried in West Laurel Hill Cemetery, Bala-Cynwyd, Pennsylvania.

== Medal of Honor citation ==
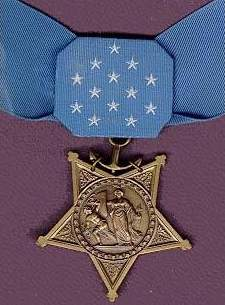

Medal of Honor citation reads:

For extraordinary heroism on 6 April 1862, while serving with, in action at Shiloh, Tennessee. A box of ammunition having been abandoned between the lines, Private Williams voluntarily went forward with one companion, under a heavy fire from both armies, secured the box, and delivered it within the line of his regiment, his companion being mortally wounded.
