= James D. Vernay =

American Union soldier during Civil War

James D. Vernay (December 24, 1834 – July 19, 1918) was an American soldier in the American Civil War who was awarded the Medal of Honor. The medal was granted on 1 April 1898 for Vernay's actions as a Second Lieutenant with the 11th Illinois Infantry at the Battle of Vicksburg on 22 April 1863. Born in Lacon, Illinois, Vernay died on 19 July 1918 and is now interred in Arlington National Cemetery.

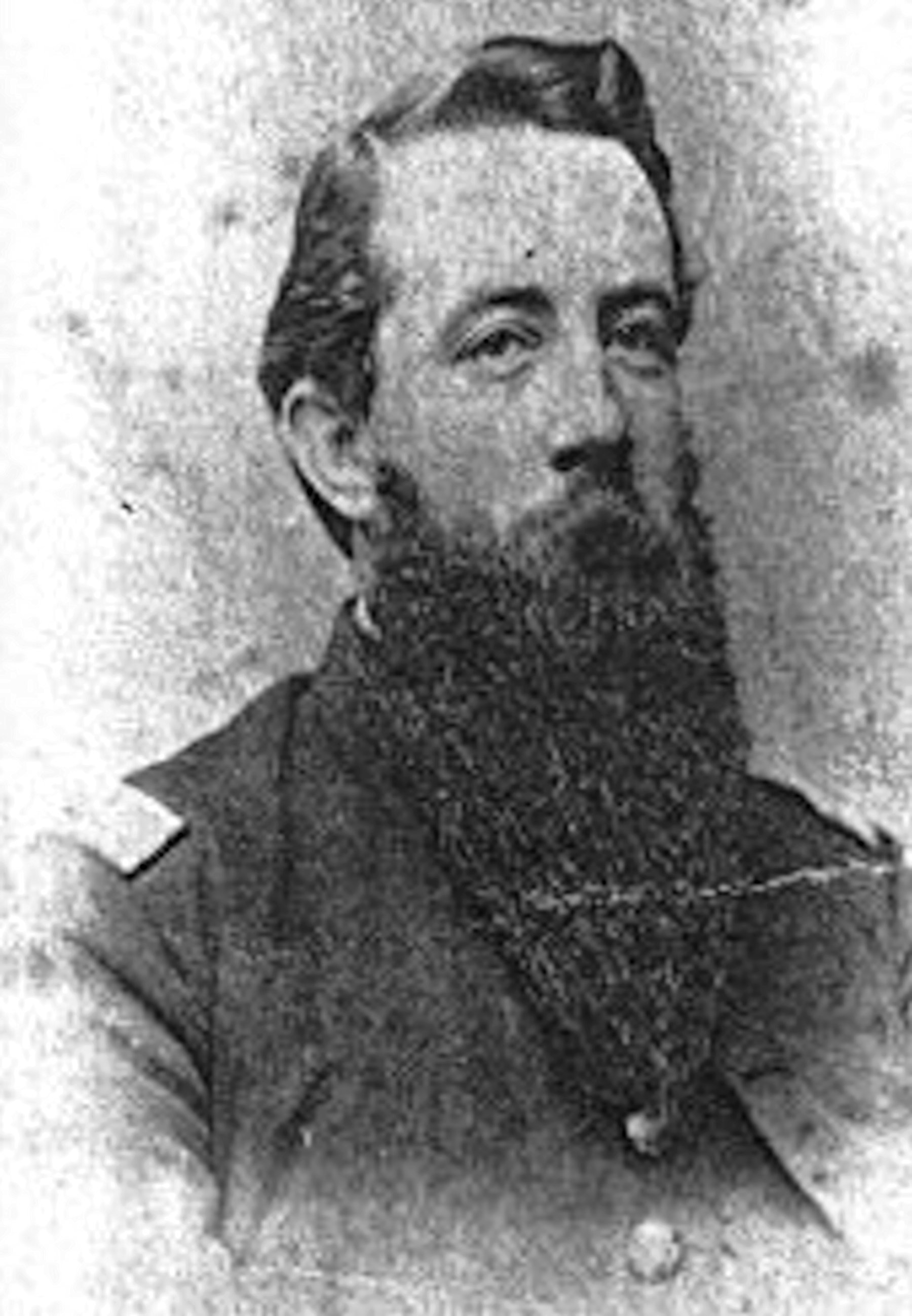

== Medal of Honor citation ==
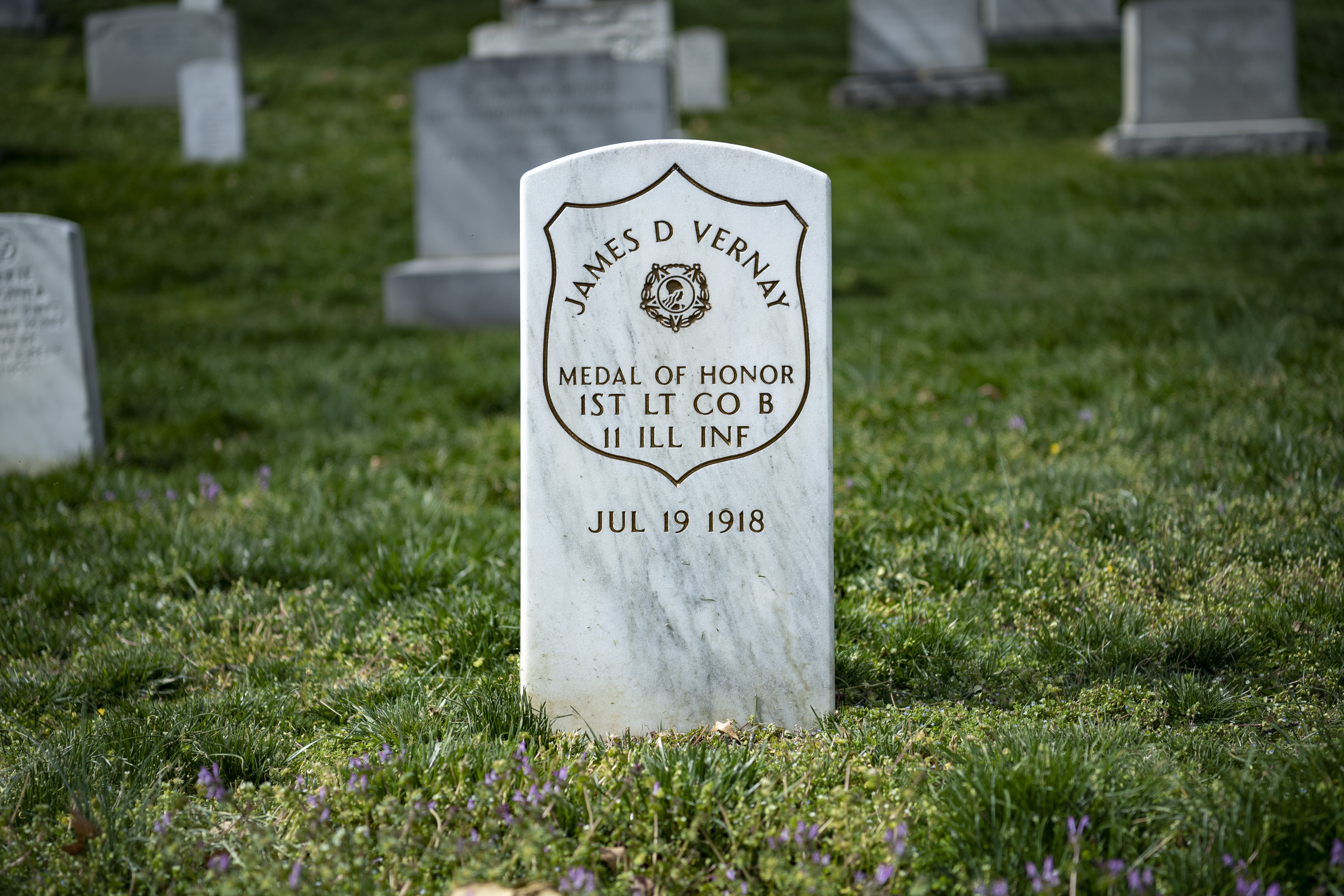
Grave at Arlington National Cemetery

Served gallantly as a volunteer with the crew of the steamer Horizon that, under a heavy fire, passed the Confederate batteries.
