= Richard H. Wood =

Richard H. Wood (November 15, 1833 - March 8, 1903) was an American soldier and recipient of the Medal of Honor.

== Biography ==
Richard Wood was born in Canton, New Jersey on November 15, 1833. He served as a captain in the 97th Illinois Infantry Regiment. He earned his medal on May 22, 1863, at the Battle of Vicksburg, Mississippi. His medal was presented to him on December 12, 1895. He died on March 8, 1903, and is now buried in Woodburn Cemetery, Woodburn, Illinois.

== Medal of Honor Citation ==
For extraordinary heroism on 22 May 1863, in action at Vicksburg, Mississippi. Captain Wood led the volunteer storming party, which made a most gallant assault upon the enemy's works.
