= Freeman C. Thompson =

American Union soldier during Civil War

Freeman C. Thompson (February 25, 1845 – August 10, 1887) was a Union Army officer in the American Civil War who was awarded the Medal of Honor for his actions at the Third Battle of Petersburg on 2 April, 1865. He fought for the 116th Ohio Infantry. Thompson was born in Monroe County, Ohio and is now buried in Olive Cemetery (Caldwell, Ohio).

== Medal of Honor Citation ==
Was twice knocked from the parapet of Fort Gregg by blows from the enemy muskets but at the third attempt fought his way into the works.

Date Issued: May 12, 1865
