= Stephen Welch (Medal of Honor) =

Stephen Welch (June 14, 1824 - 30 March, 1906) was an American soldier who received the Medal of Honor for actions during the American Civil War. The medal was presented to Welch on 13 April, 1894 for actions as a sergeant with the 154th New York Volunteer Infantry at the Battle of Rocky Face Ridge, Dug Gap, Georgia on 8 May, 1864. Welch was born in Groton, New York and is buried in Allegany, New York at the Allegany Cemetery.

== Medal of Honor ==
For extraordinary heroism on 8 May 1864, in action at Dug Gap, Georgia. Sergeant Welch risked his life in rescuing a wounded comrade under fire of the enemy.
