= Alonzo Woodruff =

American soldier

Alonzo Woodruff (March 31, 1839 - February 10, 1917) was an American soldier and recipient of the Medal of Honor for actions in the American Civil War.

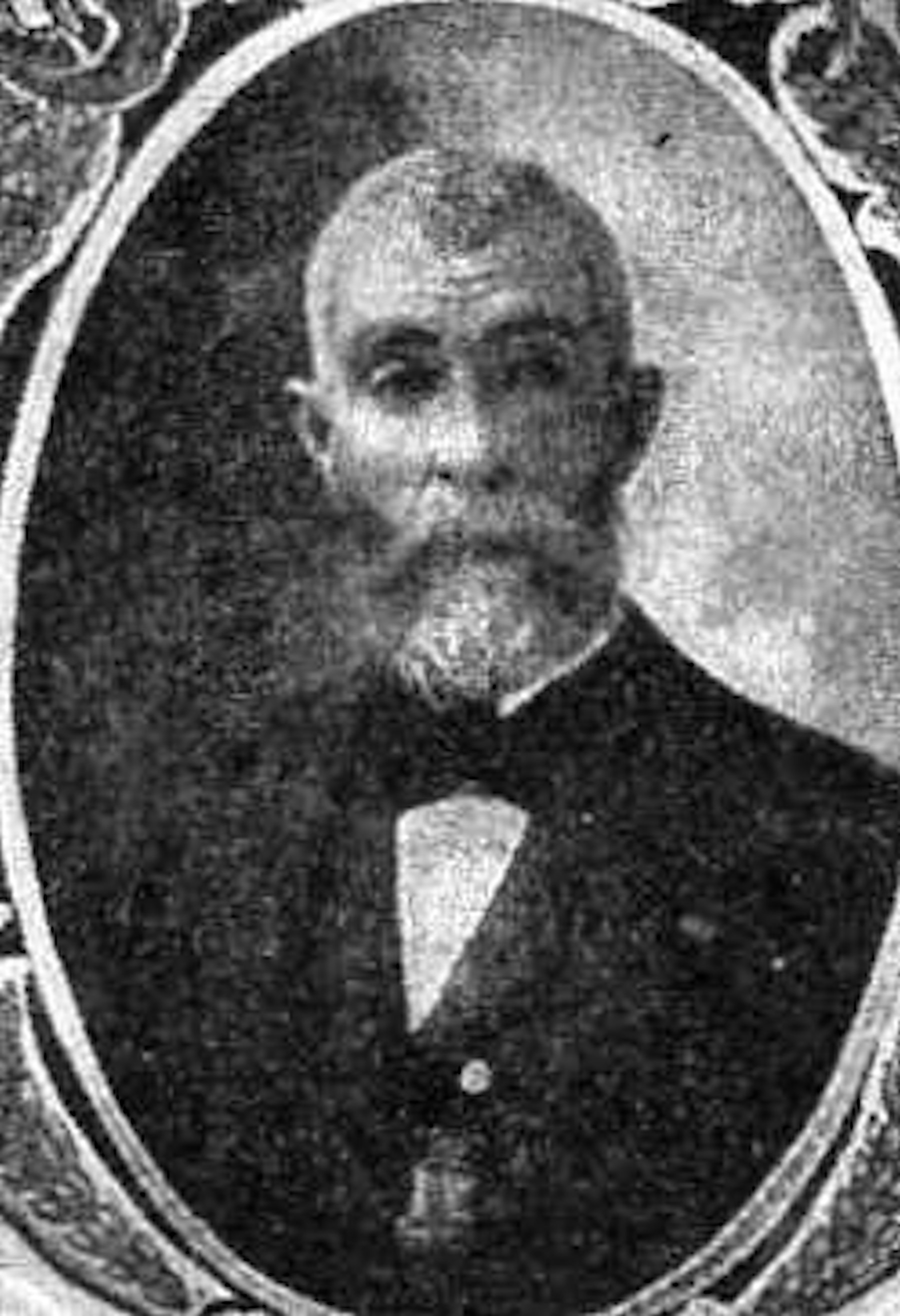

== Biography ==
Woodruff was born in Ionia, Michigan, on March 31, 1839. During the Civil War he served in the 1st United States Sharpshooters as a sergeant. He served in this role at the Battle of Boydton Plank Road on October 27, 1864, in which he earned his Medal of Honor. He died on February 10, 1917, and was buried in Valley Cemetery, Luther, Michigan.

== Medal of Honor Citation ==
For extraordinary heroism on 27 October 1864, in action at Hatcher's Run, Virginia. Sergeant Woodruff went to the assistance of a wounded and overpowered comrade, and in a hand-to-hand encounter effected his rescue.
