= William J. Wray =

American soldier and Medal of Honor recipient

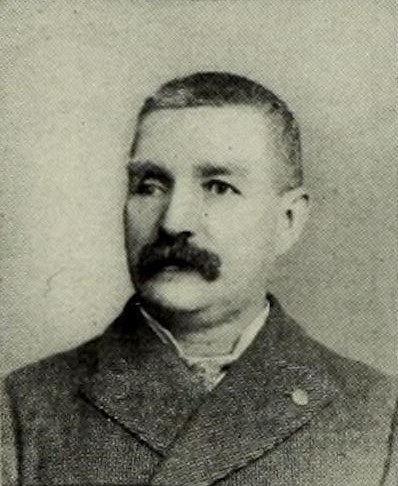
William J. Wray circa 1901

William J. Wray (May 16, 1845 - June 2, 1919) was an American soldier who won the Medal of Honor for his actions at the Battle of Fort Stevens in the American Civil War.

Wray was born in Philadelphia, and enlisted in the 23rd Pennsylvania Volunteer Infantry in 1861. He was wounded at the Battle of Fredericksburg in 1862, getting shot through the eye on December 13. After recovering, he fought as a sergeant in the 1st Veteran Reserve Corps.

Wray was awarded the Medal of Honor on December 15, 1892 for his actions at Fort Stevens on July 12, 1864. His Medal of Honor citation read: "Rallied the company at a critical moment during a change of position under fire."

Wray died aged 74 on June 2, 1919, and was buried at Philadelphia Memorial Park.
