= William Wright (Medal of Honor) =

English-born American soldier

William Wright (born c. 1835) was a British-born American soldier who fought for the Union Navy in the American Civil War. He received a Medal of Honor for his actions during a reconnaissance of Wilmington, North Carolina. The date of issue is unknown.

== Medal of Honor Citation ==
The President of the United States of America, in the name of Congress, takes pleasure in presenting the Medal of Honor to Yeoman William Wright, United States Navy, for extraordinary heroism in action while serving as Yeoman on board the U.S.S. Monticello during the reconnaissance of the harbor and water defenses of Wilmington, North Carolina, 23 to 25 June 1864. Taking part in a reconnaissance of enemy defenses which covered a period of two days and nights, Yeoman Wright courageously carried out his cutting of a telegraph wire and the capture of a large group of prisoners. Although in immediate danger from the enemy at all times, Wright showed gallantry and coolness throughout this action which resulted in the gaining of much vital information of the rebel defenses.
