= John Whitmore (Medal of Honor) =

American Union soldier during Civil War

John Whitmore (July 3, 1844 - February 26, 1918) was an American soldier in the American Civil War and recipient of the Medal of Honor.

== Biography ==
Whitmore was born in Brown County, Illinois on July 3, 1844. He joined the 119th Illinois Infantry Regiment in Company F and fought as a Private. He earned his medal on Apr 9, 1865 at the Battle of Fort Blakeley, Alabama. He died on February 26, 1918, in New London, Iowa.

== Medal of Honor Citation ==
For extraordinary heroism on 9 April 1865, in action at Fort Blakely, Alabama, for capture of flag.
