= William G. Tracy =

Union Army Medal of Honor recipient (1842–1924)

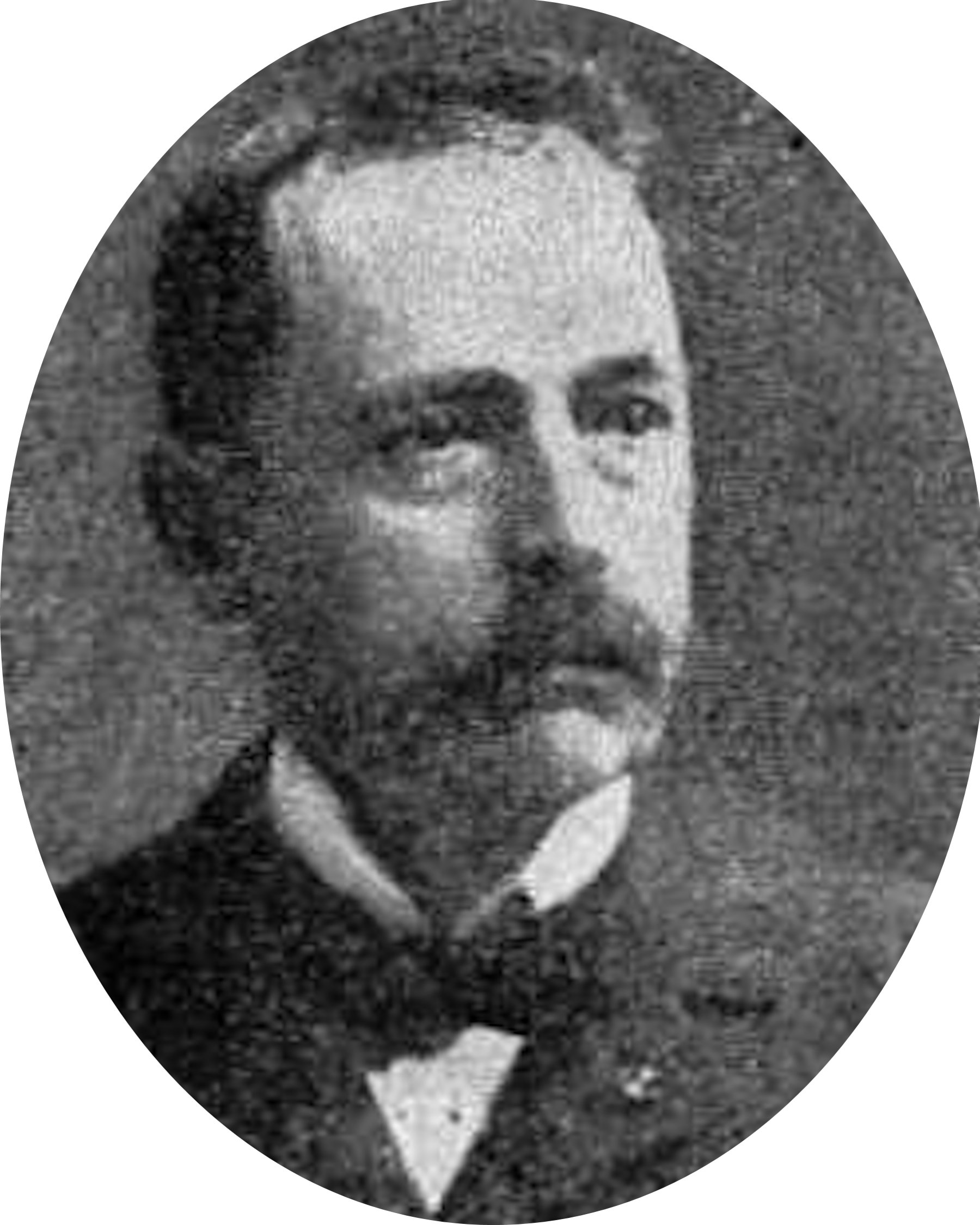

William G. Tracy (April 7, 1842 – December 8, 1924) was an American soldier awarded the Medal of Honor for actions during the American Civil War. The medal was awarded for actions as a Second Lieutenant at the Battle of Chancellorsville with the 122nd New York Infantry on 2 May, 1863. He was born in Syracuse, New York and died there in 1924.

== Medal of Honor Citation ==
Having been sent outside the lines to obtain certain information of great importance and having succeeded in his mission, was surprised upon his return by a large force of the enemy, regaining the Union lines only after greatly imperiling his life.

Date Issued: 2 May, 1895

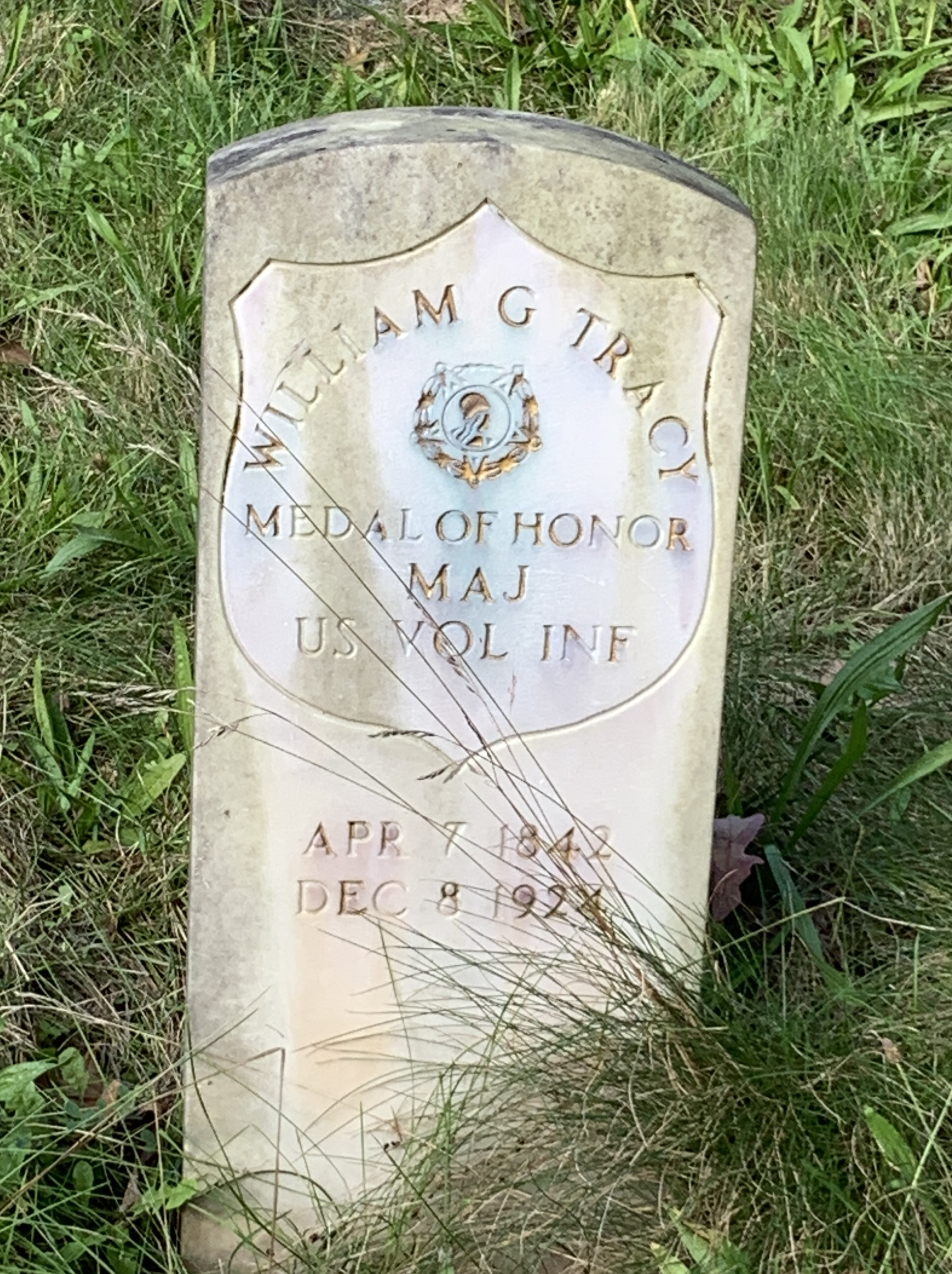
photo of his gravestone
