= William H. Walling =

American soldier (1830–1912)

William H. Walling (September 3, 1830 – June 16, 1912) was an American soldier awarded the Medal of Honor for actions at First Battle of Fort Fisher, North Carolina during the American Civil War. The medal was earned while serving with the 142nd New York Volunteer Infantry as a captain. By the end of the war he had achieved a rank of Brevet Lieutenant Colonel. He was born in Hartford, New York and died in Potsdam, New York where he is buried at Bayside Cemetery.

== Medal of Honor citation ==
For extraordinary heroism on 25 December 1864, in action at Fort Fisher, North Carolina. During the bombardment of the fort by the fleet, Captain Walling captured and brought the flag of the fort, the flagstaff having been shot down.

Date Issued: 28 March 1892
