= Thomas W. Thompson (Medal of Honor) =

American Civil War soldier

Thomas W. Thompson (May 27, 1839 - March 25, 1927) was an American Medal of Honor recipient who fought as a Sergeant in the Union Army with the 66th Ohio Infantry in the American Civil War. The medal was awarded for his actions at Chancellorville on 2 May, 1863. He was born in Champaign, Ohio and died in Mechanicsburg, Ohio. He is now buried in Maple Grove Cemetery in the city he died in.

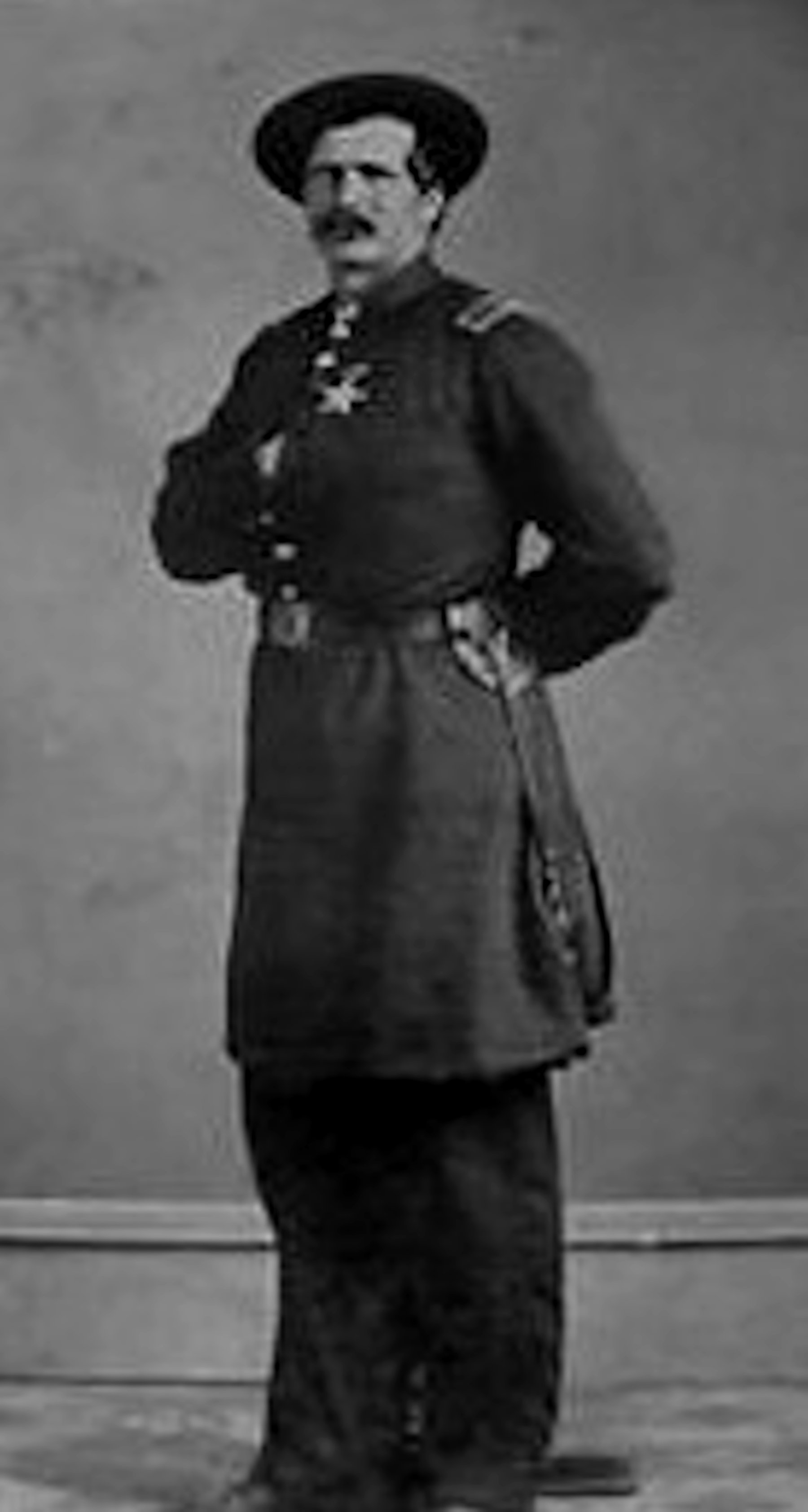

== Medal of Honor Citation ==
One of a party of four who voluntarily brought into the Union lines, under fire, a wounded Confederate officer from whom was obtained valuable information concerning the enemy.

Date Issued: 16 July, 1892
