= Robert Wright (Medal of Honor) =

Irish-American soldier (c.1828–1885)

Robert Wright (c. 1828 – October 22, 1885) was an Irish-born American soldier who fought in the Union Army during the American Civil War. He was awarded the Medal of Honor for gallantry at Chapel House Farm in 1864. He fought in the 14th U.S. Infantry during the war. He died on 22 October 1885 and is buried at Cedar Lawn Cemetery in Paterson, New Jersey.

== Medal of Honor citation ==
For gallantry in action on 1 October 1864, while serving with Company G, 14th U.S. Infantry, in action at Chapel House Farm, Virginia.

Date Issued: 25 November 1869
