= Jacob F. Yeager =

American soldier

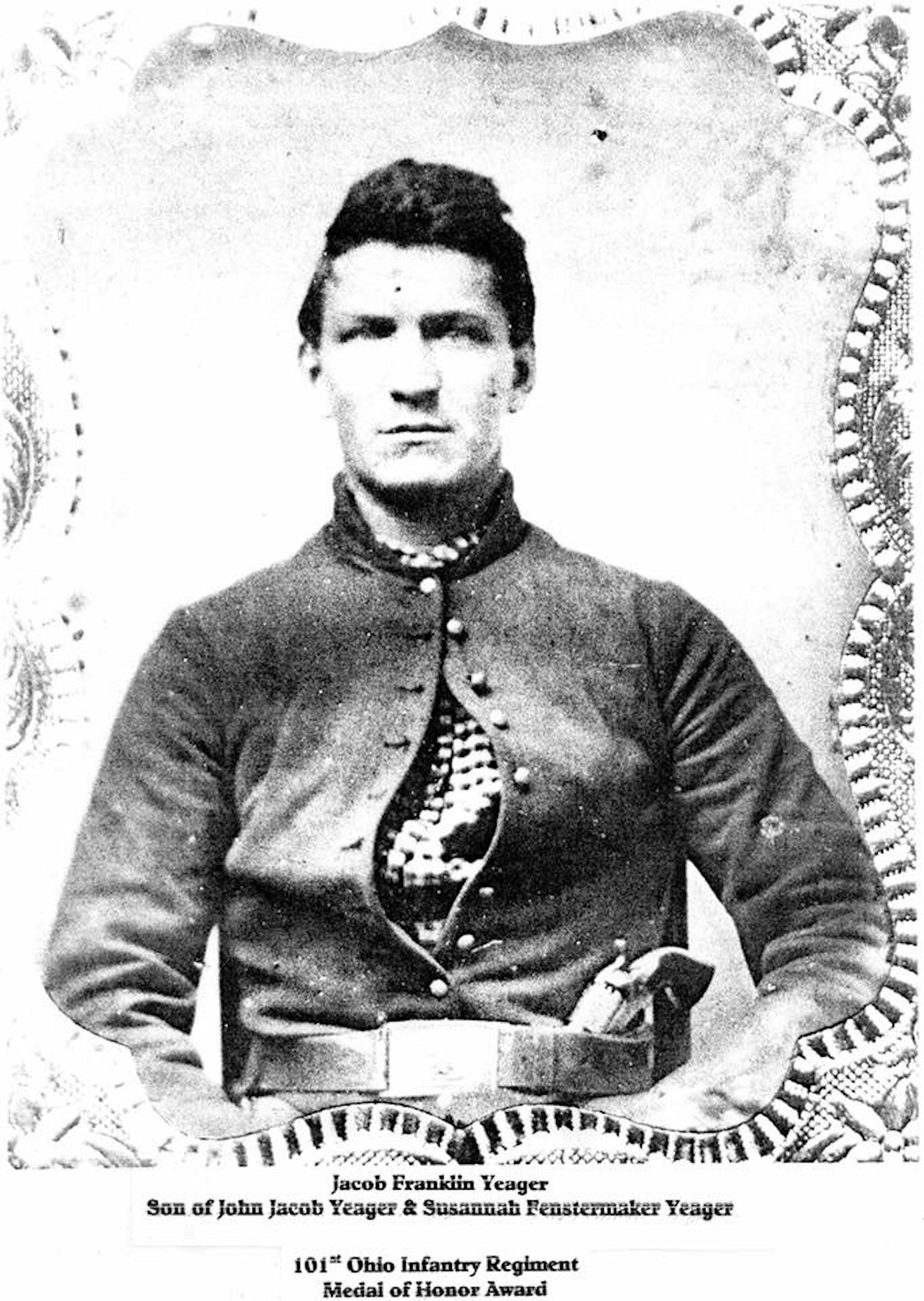
- Born: 27 January 1841
- Died: 13 November 1909 (aged 68)
- Military career
- Unit: 101st Ohio Infantry Regiment
- Awards: Medal of Honor

Jacob F. Yeager (January 27, 1841 - November 13, 1909) was an American soldier who fought in the Union Army during the American Civil War. He was awarded the Medal of Honor for his actions at Buzzard's Roost.

== Biography ==
Yeager was born on 27 January 1841 in Pennsylvania. Before and after the war, he worked in the tannery business and later in real estate. He fought in the 101st Ohio Infantry during the war where he was wounded thrice. Yeager notably appeared in the papers during the election of 1896. James A. Norton was running for Congress and was in trouble over an allegedly forged letter from a General Kirby, praising Norton's war record. On November 3, 1896, Yeager was handing out flyers by a voting place in Tiffin, Ohio decrying the aforementioned letter as a forgery when Norton arrived on the scene. Egged on by friends, Norton made an assault on Yeager, shouting "I'll kill you" resulting in the latter's injury. The Seneca County Grand Jury reviewed an indictment of Norton for "assault with intent to kill" but it was turned down by one vote. Accounts are conflicted though with some papers attributing Yeager as the fight's instigator. Jacob F. Yeager died on 13 November 1909 and is now buried at Greenlawn Cemetery, Tiffin, Ohio.

== Medal of Honor Citation ==
For extraordinary heroism on 11 May 1864, in action at Buzzard's Roost, Georgia. Private Yeager seized a shell with fuse burning that had fallen in the ranks of his company and threw it into a stream, thereby probably saving his comrades from injury.

Date Issued: 3 August 1897
