= George William Tyrrell =

American Civil War Medal of Honor recipient

- Born: Ireland
- Military career
- Allegiance: United States
- Branch: United States Army
- Rank: Corporal
- Units: Company H, 5th Ohio Infantry
- Conflicts: American Civil War
- Awards: Medal of Honor

George William Tyrrell was a Union Army officer in the American Civil War who received the U.S. military's highest decoration, the Medal of Honor.

Tyrrell was born in Ireland and entered service in Hamilton County, Ohio. He was awarded the Medal of Honor, for extraordinary heroism shown on May 14, 1864, while serving as a corporal with Company G, 5th New York Cavalry, at Battle of Resaca in Georgia. Tyrrell won his medal for capturing a Confederate battle flag. His Medal of Honor was issued on June 11, 1895.

It is not known when Tyrrell was born, when he died or where he was buried.
