= Eugene M. Tinkham =

American Union soldier during Civil War

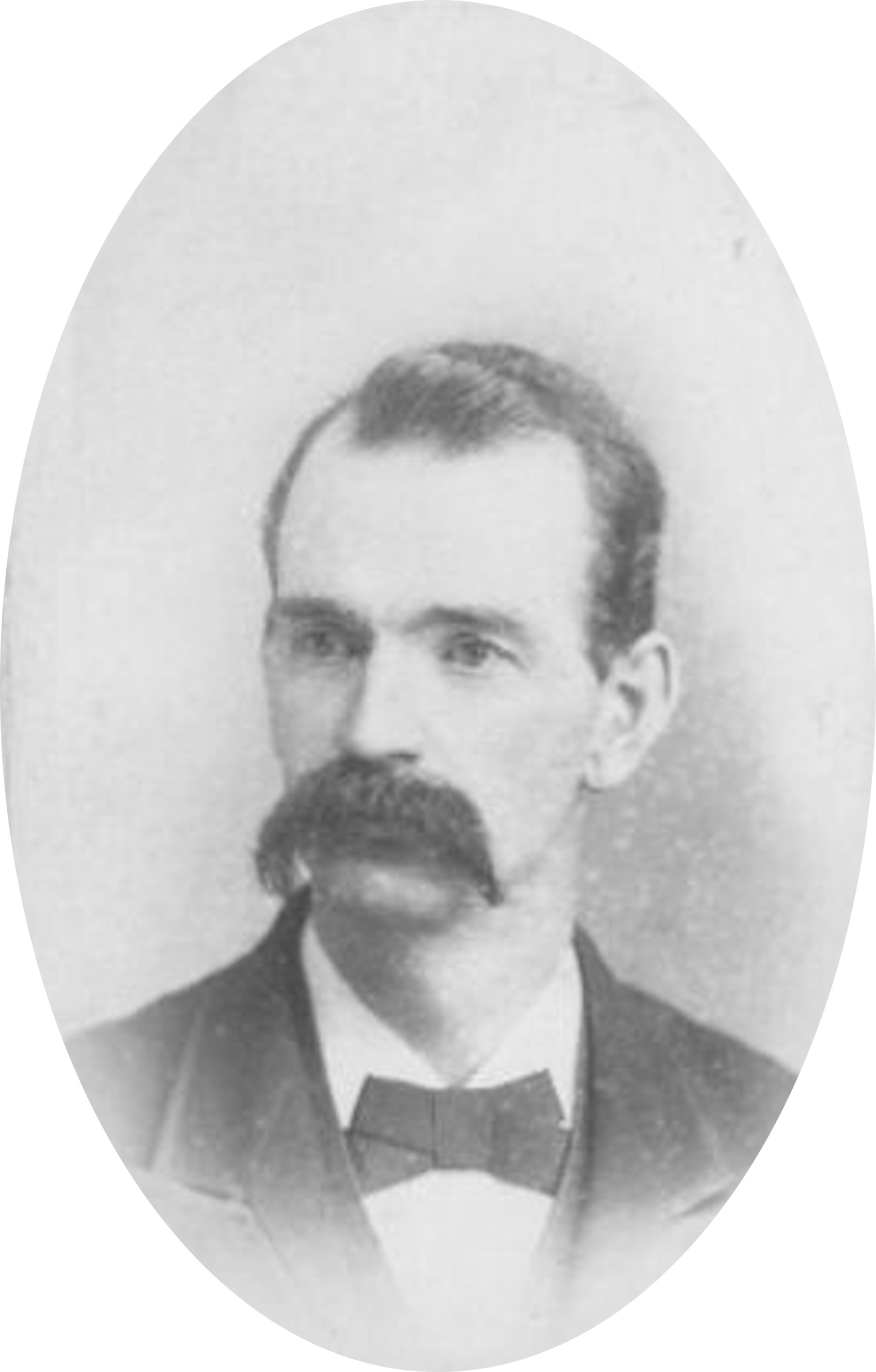
Eugene M. Tinkham (c. 1870)

Eugene M. Tinkham (April 19, 1842 - October 21, 1909) was an American soldier awarded the Medal of Honor for his actions in the Union Army in the American Civil War. He was awarded the medal whilst fighting with the 148th New York Infantry at the Battle of Cold Harbor on 3 June, 1864. Although born in Sprague, Connecticut he live most of life after the war in Waterloo, New York. He died in Springfield, Massachusetts and is buried in New Hanover Cemetery in Hanover, Connecticut.

== Medal of Honor Citation ==
Though himself wounded, voluntarily left the rifle pits, crept out between the lines and, exposed to the severe fire of the enemy's guns at close range, brought within the lines two wounded and helpless comrades.

Date Issued: 5 April, 1898
