= List of Medal of Honor recipients for the Second Battle of Fort Fisher =

The Second Battle of Fort Fisher was a joint assault by Union Army and naval forces against the Confederate Fort Fisher, outside Wilmington, North Carolina, near the end of the American Civil War. Sometimes referred to as the "Gibraltar of the South" and the last major coastal stronghold of the Confederacy, Fort Fisher had tremendous strategic value during the war. The Medal of Honor was awarded to 54 Union servicemen for their actions during this battle.

The Medal of Honor was created during the American Civil War and is the highest military decoration presented by the United States government to a member of its armed forces. The recipient must have distinguished themselves at the risk of their own life above and beyond the call of duty in action against an enemy of the United States. Due to the nature of this medal, it is commonly presented posthumously.

== Recipients ==
Image	Name	Service	Rank	Date of action	Unit	Notes
—	Bruce Anderson	Army	Private	January 15, 1865	Company K, 142nd New York Infantry	"Voluntarily advanced with the head of the column and cut down the palisading"
—	John Anglin	Navy	Cabin Boy	24 December 1864 to 22 January 1865	USS Pontoosuc (1864)	Carried out his duties while under the fire of the enemy
—	James Barnum	Navy	Boatswain's Mate	December 24–25, 1864 and January 13–15, 1865	USS New Ironsides (1862)	"[Was] commended for highly meritorious conduct" during an all day battle between his ship and Fort Fisher
—	Gurdon H. Barter	Navy	Landsman	January 15, 1865	USS Minnesota (1855)	"Landing on the beach with the assaulting party from his ship, he advanced to the top of the sand hill and partly through the breach in the palisades despite enemy fire which killed and wounded many officers and men. When more than two-thirds of the men became seized with panic and retreated on the run, he remained with the party until dark, when it came safely away, bringing its wounded, its arms, and its colors."
—	David L. Bass	Navy	Seaman	15 January 1865	USS Minnesota (1855)	"Landing on the beach with the assaulting party from his ship, S/man Bass advanced to the top of the sand hill and partly through the breach in the palisades despite enemy fire which killed and wounded many officers and men. When more than two-thirds of the men became seized with panic and retreated on the run, he remained with the party until dark, when it came safely away, bringing its wounded, its arms, and its colors"
—	Philip Bazaar	Navy	Ordinary Seaman	15 January 1865	USS Santiago de Cuba	Was one of six men who entered the fort in an assault and accompanied his party in carrying dispatches at the height of the battle
—	Asa Betham	Navy	Coxswain	24 December 1864, to 22 January 1865	USS Pontoosuc (1864)	
	Richard Binder	Marine Corps	Sergeant	24 and December 25, 1864, and 13 to January 15, 1865	USS Ticonderoga (1862)	
—	Robert M. Blair	Navy	Boatswain's Mate	24 December 1864 to 22 January 1865	USS Pontoosuc (1864)	
—	Edward R. Bowman	Navy	Quartermaster	13 to 15 January 1865	USS Ticonderoga (1862)	Although severely wounded he continued to perform his duties throughout the action
—	Albert Burton	Navy	Seaman	15 January 1865	USS Wabash (1855)	
—	William Campbell	Navy	Boatswain's Mate	24 and 25 December 1864; and 13 to 15 January 1865	USS Ticonderoga (1862)	
	Alaric B. Chapin	Army	Private	15 January 1865	Company G, 142d New York Infantry	"[V]oluntarily advanced with the head of the column and cut down the palisading"
—	Thomas Connor	Navy	Ordinary Seaman	15 January 1865	USS Minnesota (1855)	
	Newton Martin Curtis	Army	Brigadier General	15 January 1865	U.S. Volunteers	Was the first to pass through the stockade and although being wounded 4 times led each assault on the traverses of the fort
—	John Dempster	Navy	Coxswain	24 and 25 December 1864; and 13, 14, and 15 January 1865	USS New Ironsides (1862)	
—	William Dunn	Navy	Quartermaster	24 and 25 December 1864; and 13, 14, and 15 January 1865	USS Monadnock (1863)	
—	Thomas English	Navy	Signal Quartermaster	24 and 25 December 1864; and 13, 14, and 15 January 1865	USS New Ironsides (1862)	
—	Charles H. Foy	Navy	Signal Quartermaster	13 to 15 January 1865	USS Rhode Island (1861)	
—	William H. Freeman	Army	Private	15 January 1865	Company B, 169th New York Infantry	"Volunteered to carry the brigade flag after the bearer was wounded"
—	Isaac N. Fry	Marine Corps	Orderly Sergeant	13 to 15 January 1865	USS Ticonderoga (1862)	
—	John Griffiths	Navy	Captain of the Forecastle	15 January 1865	USS Santiago de Cuba (1861)	While working for one of the generals on shore he carried dispatches during the battle and was one of 6 who entered the fort in the assault
—	Edmund Haffee	Navy	Quarter Gunner	24 and 25 December 1864; and 13, 14, and 15 January 1865	USS New Ironsides (1862)	
—	Thomas Harcourt	Navy	Ordinary Seaman	15 January 1865	USS Minnesota (1855)	
—	Joseph B. Hayden	Navy	Quartermaster	13 to 15 January 1865	USS Ticonderoga (1862)	
—	Thomas Jones	Navy	Coxswain	24 and 25 December 1864; and 13 to 15 January 1865	USS Ticonderoga (1862)	
—	Thomas Kane	Navy	Captain of the Hold	15 January 1865	USS Nereus (1863)	
—	Nicholas Lear	Navy	Quartermaster	24 and 25 December 1864; and 13, 14, and 15 January 1865	USS New Ironsides (1862)	
—	George Merrill	Army	Private	15 January 1865	Company I, 142d New York Infantry	"Voluntarily advanced with the head of the column and cut down the palisading"
—	Daniel Milliken	Navy	Quarter Gunner	24 and 25 December 1864_ and 13,14 and 15 January 1865	USS New Ironsides (1862)	
—	Charles Mills	Navy	Seaman	15 January 1865	USS Minnesota (1855)	
—	Zachariah C. Neahr	Army	Private	16 January 1865	Company K, 142d New York Infantry	Voluntarily advanced with the head of the column and cut down the palisading
	Galusha Pennypacker	Army	Colonel	15 January 1865	97th Pennsylvania Infantry	"Gallantly led the charge over a traverse and planted the colors of one of his regiments thereon, was severely wounded"
—	George Prance	Navy	Captain of the Main Top	24 and 25 December 1864; and 13 to 15 January 1865	USS Ticonderoga (1862)	
—	George Province	Navy	Ordinary Seaman	15 January 1865	USS Santiago de Cuba (1861)	While working for one of the generals on shore he carried dispatches during the battle and was one of 6 who entered the fort in the assault
—	John Rannahan	Marine Corps	Corporal	15 January 1865	USS Minnesota (1855)	
—	Auzella Savage	Navy	Ordinary Seaman	15 January 1865	USS Santiago de Cuba (1861)	
	Louis C. Shepard	Navy	Ordinary Seaman	15 January 1865	USS Wabash (1855)	
—	William Shipman	Navy	Coxswain	15 January 1865	USS Ticonderoga (1862)	
—	John Shivers	Marine Corps	Private	15 January 1865	USS Minnesota (1855)	
—	Robert Sommers	Navy	Chief Quartermaster	13 to 15 January 1865	USS Ticonderoga (1862)	
	Daniel D. Stevens	Navy	Quartermaster	13 January 1865	USS Canonicus	
—	John Swanson	Navy	Seaman	15 January 1865	USS Santiago de Cuba (1861)	While working for one of the generals on shore he carried dispatches during the battle and was one of 6 who entered the fort in the assault
—	Edward Swatton	Navy	Seaman	15 January 1865	USS Santiago de Cuba (1861)	While working for one of the generals on shore he carried dispatches during the battle and was one of 6 who entered the fort in the assault
—	James Tallentine	Navy	Captain of the Forecastle	31 October 1864	USS Tacony (1863)	Participated in landing and spiking a 9-inch gun while under devastating fire from enemy musketry.
—	Henry A. Thompson	Marine Corps	Private	15 January 1865	USS Minnesota (1855)	
—	Andrew J. Tomlin	Marine Corps	Corporal	15 January 1865	USS Wabash (1855)	
—	Othniel Tripp	Navy	Chief Boatswain's Mate	15 January 1865	USS Seneca (1861)	"Despite severe enemy fire which halted an attempt by his assaulting party to enter the stockade, Tripp boldly charged through the gap in the stockade although the center of the line, being totally unprotected, fell back along the open beach and left too few in the ranks to attempt an offensive operation."
—	John Wainwright	Army	First Lieutenant	15 January 1865	Company F, 97th Pennsylvania Infantry	"Gallant and meritorious conduct, where, as first lieutenant, he commanded the regiment."
—	Henry S. Webster	Navy	Landsman	15 January 1865	USS Susquehanna (1850)	
—	Joseph White	Navy	Coxswain	24 and 25 December 1864; and 13,14, and 15 January 1865	USS New Ironsides (1862)	
—	Franklin L. Wilcox	Navy	Ordinary Seaman	15 January 1865	USS Minnesota (1855)	
—	Augustus Williams	Navy	Seaman	15 January 1865	USS Santiago de Cuba (1861)	
—	Richard Willis	Navy	Coxswain	24 and 25 December 1864; and 13, 14 and 15 January 1865	USS New Ironsides (1862)	
