= Robert Summers =

Robert Summers may refer to:

- Robert S. Summers (1933–2019), American academic
- Robert Summers (artist) (born 1940), American artist most known for his sculptures
- Robert Summers (badminton) (born 2002), South African badminton player
- Robert Summers (economist) (1922–2012), American economist
- Rob Summers (born 1972), American stock car racing driver

== See also ==
- Robert Sommers (1911–2000), British Columbia politician
- Robert Sommers (Medal of Honor) (1837–1919), American Civil War sailor
