= Robert Wilson Shufeldt (naval officer) =

Naval officer and diplomat

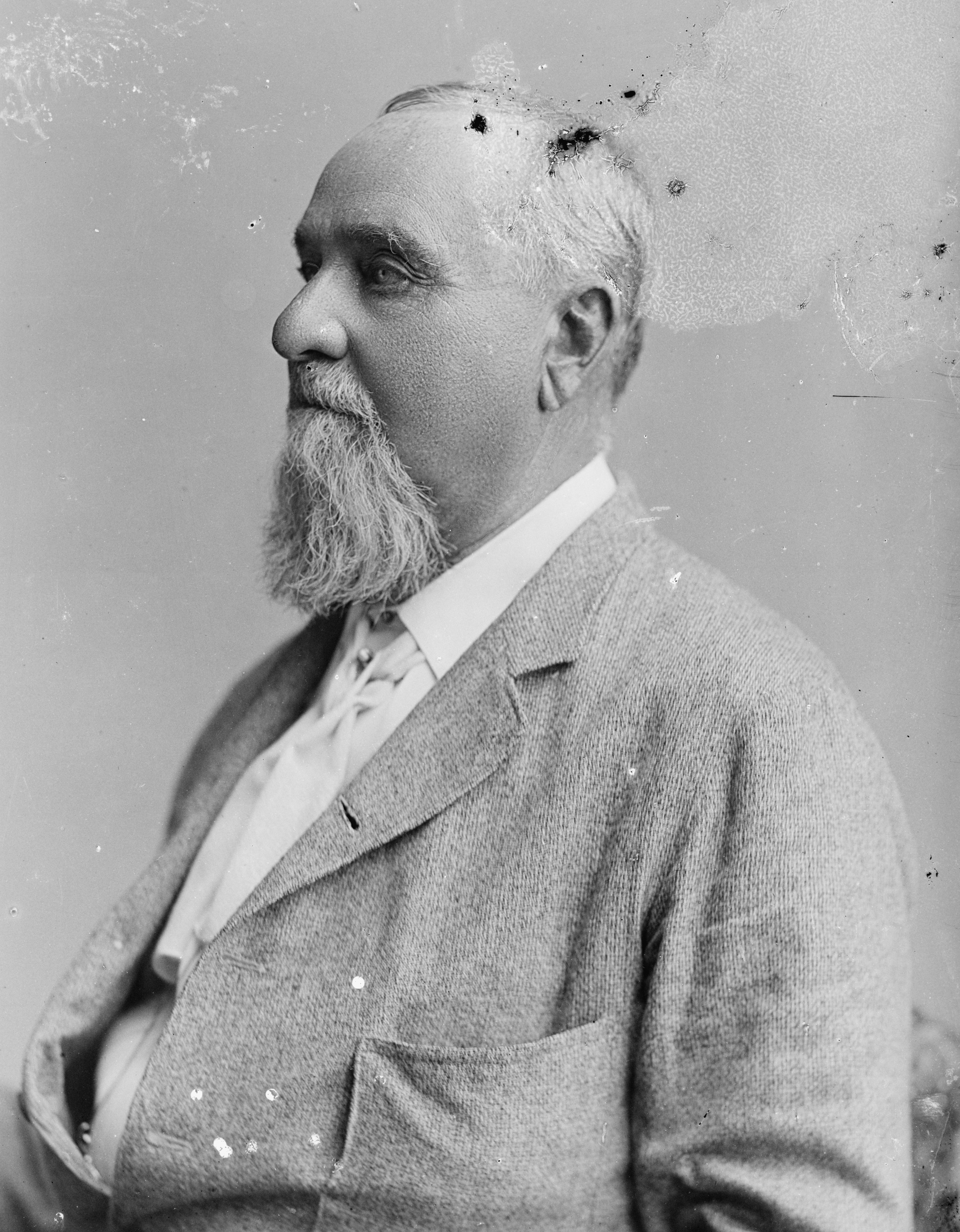
- Born: February 21, 1822; Red Hook, New York
- Died: November 7, 1895 (aged 73) Washington, D.C.
- Allegiance: United States
- Branch: United States Navy
- Service years: 1839–1854, 1863–1884
- Rank: Rear Admiral
- Commands: U.S. Naval Observatory; Bureau of Equipment and Recruiting; USS Plymouth; USS Wabash; USS Miantonomoh; USS Wachusett; USS Hartford; USS Proteus; USS Conemaugh; SS Quaker City; SS Catawba; SS Black Warrior
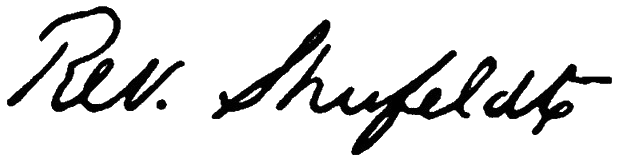
- Signature

Robert Wilson Shufeldt (February 21, 1822 – November 7, 1895) was a 19th-century officer in the United States Navy best known for his negotiation of the 1882 Shufeldt Treaty with Korea, the first treaty signed by that country with a Western nation. He was Consul-General of the United States to Cuba at the beginning of the American Civil War, commander of USS Wachusett and, as a commodore, flew his pennant on USS Ticonderoga.

== Personal life ==
Robert Wilson Shufeldt was born in Red Hook, New York on February 21, 1822. He was married in 1848 to Sarah Hutchins Abercrombie, daughter of Reverend James Abercrombie. Their first child, Robert Wilson Shufeldt Jr (1850-1934) was a medical doctor and pioneer in the study of ancient human remains, ornithology, and an advocate of white supremacy. Their adopted daughter, Mary Abercrombie Shufeldt, accompanied her father to China on a diplomatic mission in 1881 and acted as his secretary. She later donated ethnographic material from her travels to the Smithsonian Institution.

== Naval and diplomatic career ==
Shufeldt studied at Middlebury College from 1837 until 1839, but left before graduation to join the United States Navy as a midshipman. He spent fifteen years serving on foreign stations and working on the coast survey. He visited and became interested in the colony in Liberia in West Africa. In 1854, he resigned his commission and was engaged in the mercantile marine service and worked to create a trade route across the Isthmus of Tehuantepec. While working for the New York & New Orleans Steamship Co., Shufeldt superintended the construction of the steamers SS Black Warrior and SS Catawba and served as their commander. He wrote in 1860 an article on the subject of slave trade between Cuba and Africa, in consequence of which he was appointed to a position where he could break up that trade, which he did.

Accordingly, after the outbreak of the Civil War, while serving as commander of the steamer SS Quaker City, Shufeldt was appointed to the position of Consul-General of the United States' mission in Havana, Cuba, likely with the support of Secretary of State William Seward. The first two years of the civil war were spent on civilian diplomatic duties. He on one occasion went in secret on a mission to President Juarez of Mexico, moving unnoticed and disguised through French lines to do so. As Consul-General to Cuba from 1861 to 1863, he played a role in the Trent Affair.

He returned to the Navy as a Commander in 1863, and commanded USS Conemaugh and USS Proteus blockading Southern ports for two years. In 1865, he went to China as captain of the flagship USS Hartford. Following the war, he commanded USS Wachusett. In 1867, he attempted to investigate the sinking of the SS General Sherman in Korea, but was forced to turn back by bad winter weather. During the 1860s and 1870s, Shufeldt became established in naval circles as an advocate of reform and the expansion of trade. Promoted to Captain in 1869, Shufeldt commanded the monitor USS Miantonomoh. In 1870, he was responsible for putting together the survey of the Isthmus of Tehuantepec and the report laid the ground for the ship-railway project canvassed for a time by the engineer Captain James Buchanan Eads. From 1871 to 1872, Shufeldt served with the European Squadron, commanding both the flagship USS Wabash and USS Plymouth. From 1872 to 1874, he was assigned to the New York Navy Yard. With a considerable reputation and strong political connections, in 1875 Shufeldt was appointed the first head of the newly formed Bureau of Equipment and Recruiting, which eventually became the Navy's Bureau of Naval Personnel.

Promoted to Commodore in 1876, he returned to Korea on his flagship USS Ticonderoga during her circumnavigation of the globe in 1878, establishing relationships with Japanese and Chinese diplomats and political leaders in the region, including Li Hongzhang. As a result of that interest, he was appointed the American representative to the 1882 Treaty of Peace, Amity, Commerce and Navigation with Korea, known in the West as the "Shufeldt Treaty," which negotiated protection for shipwrecked sailors, commerce regulations, and a most-favored nation status for the United States.

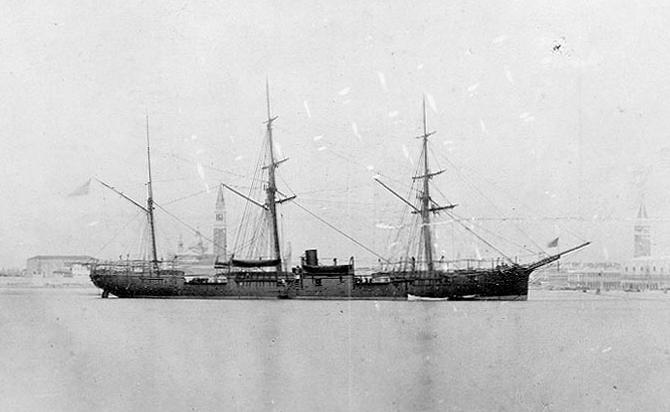
USS Ticonderoga in 1863, before Shufeldt's circumnavigation of the globe

Tyler Dennett, writing his 1922 analysis of 19th century US policy as regards Japan, China and Korea, is highly critical of the personalised nature of US diplomatic moves. One of his key illustrations is the career of Shufeldt, who returned to China in 1881, but was not well received in Tientsin where he was stationed. While there Shufeldt wrote privately to Senator A. A. Sargent of California in consequence of the poor treatment he had received at the hands of the Chinese. However, the letter went much further, denigrating the character of the powerful Chinese he had to deal with, and stating that American higher motivation was misplaced because only selfishness and force would be understood. This letter was later published but its immediate impact is thought to explain the failure of the US government (now forced to rethink its Far Eastern policy as an integrated whole) to give Shufeldt the direct authority he requested to sign the Korea treaty, which he did anyway. Shufeldt returned to California in July 1882, and spent the next few months recuperating while the Senate ratified the treaty with Korea.

He returned to Washington in 1883, where he was made the President of the Naval Advisory Board and the Superintendent of the U.S. Naval Observatory, and was promoted to Rear Admiral. Shufeldt retired from the Navy in 1884, and visited Korea once more as a private citizen following his retirement. He died of pneumonia on November 7, 1895, in Washington, D.C., and is buried in Arlington National Cemetery.

== Works ==
- Shufeldt, Robert W. (1871). Reports of Explorations and Surveys, to Ascertain the Practicability of a Ship-Canal between the Atlantic and Pacific Oceans, by the Way of the Isthmus of Tehuantepec. Washington: United States. Congress. Senate. Committee on Naval, Affairs and Services United States. Congress. Senate. Committee on Armed.
- ---, "Secret History of the Slave Trade to Cuba Written By an American Naval Officer, Robert Wilson Schufeldt, 1861 edited by Frederick C. Drake, The Journal of Negro History 1970 55:3: 218-235.
- (Missing) In 1897 the historian William Ellis Griffis wrote: "The official history of the semi-diplomatic cruise of the Ticonderoga round the world has been written but not yet published."
