= Joseph Hayden =

Joseph Hayden may refer to:

- Joseph Haydn (1732–1809), Austrian composer
- Joseph B. Hayden (1834–?), U.S. Navy sailor and Medal of Honor recipient
