= David Bass =

David Bass may refer to:

- David Bass, member of The Freight Hoppers
- David Bass (American football) (born 1990), American football player
- David L. Bass (1842–1886), American Civil War sailor

== See also ==
- David Baas (born 1981), American football player
- Dave Bass (born 1950), American jazz musician
