= Joseph White (Medal of Honor) =

- Born: c. 1840; Washington, D.C.
- Military career
- Allegiance: United States of America; Union
- Branch: United States Navy; Union Navy
- Rank: Coxswain
- Unit: USS New Ironsides (1862)
- Conflicts: American Civil War • First Battle of Fort Fisher • Second Battle of Fort Fisher
- Awards: Medal of Honor

Joseph White (c. 1840 – unknown) was a sailor in the U.S. Navy during the American Civil War. He received the Medal of Honor for his actions during the Second Battle of Fort Fisher on January 15, 1865.

== Military service ==
White volunteered for service in the U.S. Navy and was assigned to the Union ironclad USS New Ironsides (1862). His enlistment is credited to the state of Pennsylvania.

On January 15, 1865, the North Carolina Confederate stronghold of Fort Fisher was taken by a combined Union storming party of sailors, marines, and soldiers under the command of Admiral David Dixon Porter and General Alfred Terry.

== Medal of Honor citation ==
The President of the United States of America, in the name of Congress, takes pleasure in presenting the Medal of Honor to Coxswain Joseph White, United States Navy, for extraordinary heroism in action while serving on board the U.S.S. New Ironsides during action in several attacks on Fort Fisher, North Carolina, 24 and 25 December 1864; and 13,14, and 15 January 1865. The ship steamed in and took the lead in the ironclad division close inshore and immediately opened its starboard battery in a barrage of well-directed fire to cause several fires and explosions and dismount several guns during the first two days of fighting. Taken under fire as she steamed into position on 13 January, the New Ironsides fought all day and took on ammunition at night despite severe weather conditions. When the enemy came out of his bombproofs to defend the fort against the storming party, the ships battery disabled nearly every gun on the fort facing the shore before the ceasefire order was given by the flagship.

General Orders: War Department, General Orders No. 59 (June 22, 1865)

Action Date: December 24–25, 1864 & January 13–15, 1865

Service: Navy

Rank: Coxswain

Division: U.S.S. New Ironsides

== See also ==
- List of American Civil War Medal of Honor recipients: T–Z
- List of Medal of Honor recipients for the Second Battle of Fort Fisher
