= Albert Burton =

Union Navy Medal of Honor recipient

- Born: c. 1838; England
- Military career
- Allegiance: United States of America; Union
- Branch: United States Navy; Union Navy
- Rank: Seaman
- Unit: USS Wabash (1855)
- Conflicts: American Civil War • Second Battle of Fort Fisher
- Awards: Medal of Honor

Albert Burton (c. 1838 – unknown) was a sailor in the U.S. Navy during the American Civil War. He received the Medal of Honor for his actions during the Second Battle of Fort Fisher on January 15, 1865.

== Military service ==
Immigrating from his native England, Burton volunteered for service in the U.S. Navy and was assigned to the Union frigate USS Wabash (1855). His enlistment is credited to the state of New York.

On January 15, 1865, the North Carolina Confederate stronghold of Fort Fisher was taken by a combined Union storming party of sailors, marines, and soldiers under the command of Admiral David Dixon Porter and General Alfred Terry. Burton was a member of the storming party.

== Medal of Honor citation ==
The President of the United States of America, in the name of Congress, takes pleasure in presenting the Medal of Honor to Seaman Albert Burton, United States Navy, for extraordinary heroism in action while serving on board the U.S.S. Wabash in the assault on Fort Fisher, North Carolina, 15 January 1865. Advancing gallantly through the severe enemy fire while armed only with a revolver and cutlass which made it impossible to return the fire at that range, Seaman Burton succeeded in reaching the angle of the fort and going on, to be one of the few who entered the fort. When the rest of the body of men to his rear were forced to retreat under a devastating fire, he was forced to withdraw through lack of support, and to seek the shelter of one of the mounds near the stockade from which point he succeeded in regaining the safety of his ship.

General Orders: War Department, General Orders No. 59 (June 22, 1865)

Action Date: January 15, 1865

Service: Navy

Rank: Seaman

Division: U.S.S. Wabash

== See also ==
- List of American Civil War Medal of Honor recipients: A–F
- List of Medal of Honor recipients for the Second Battle of Fort Fisher
