= Edward R. Bowman =

Union Navy Medal of Honor recipient (c. 1826 – 1898)

- Born: c. 1826; Eastport, Maine, US
- Died: 1898 (aged 71–72); Maine, US
- Burial place: Hillside Cemetery, Eastport, Maine
- Military career
- Allegiance: United States of America; Union
- Branch: United States Navy; Union Navy
- Rank: Quartermaster
- Unit: USS Ticonderoga (1862)
- Conflicts: American Civil War • Second Battle of Fort Fisher
- Awards: Medal of Honor

Edward R. Bowman (c. 1826 – 1898) was a sailor in the U.S. Navy during the American Civil War. He received the Medal of Honor for his actions during the Second Battle of Fort Fisher on January 15, 1865.

== Military service ==
Bowman volunteered for service in the U.S. Navy and was assigned to the Union sloop-of-war USS Ticonderoga (1862). His enlistment is credited to the state of Maine.

On January 15, 1865, the North Carolina Confederate stronghold of Fort Fisher was taken by a combined Union storming party of sailors, marines, and soldiers under the command of Admiral David Dixon Porter and General Alfred Terry. Bowman was aboard the Ticonderoga which directed its fire at Fort Fisher.

== Medal of Honor citation ==
The President of the United States of America, in the name of Congress, takes pleasure in presenting the Medal of Honor to Quartermaster Edward R. Bowman, United States Navy, for extraordinary heroism in action while serving on board the U.S.S. TICONDEROGA during attacks on Fort Fisher, North Carolina, 13 to 15 January 1865. Despite severe wounds sustained during the action Quartermaster Bowman displayed outstanding courage in the performance of duty as his ship maintained its well-placed fire upon the batteries on shore, and thereafter, as she materially lessened the power of guns on the mound which had been turned upon our assaulting columns. During this battle the flag was planted on one of the strongest fortifications possessed by the rebels.

General Orders: War Department, General Orders No. 59 (June 22, 1865)

Action Date: January 15, 1865

Service: Navy

Rank: Quartermaster

Division: U.S.S. Ticonderoga

== See also ==
- List of American Civil War Medal of Honor recipients: A–F
- List of Medal of Honor recipients for the Second Battle of Fort Fisher
