= Jeannette Monument =

Coordinates: 38°59′13″N 76°29′25″W

- United States Naval Academy
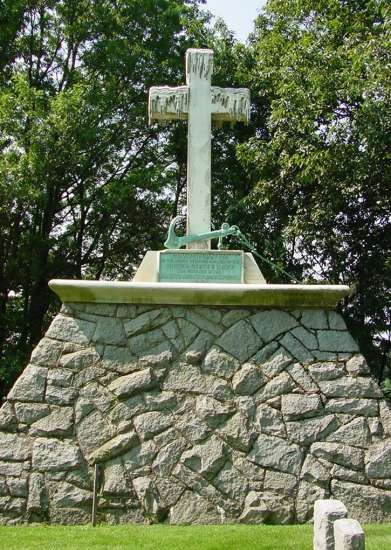
- Cemetery of the US Naval Academy
- For the lost explorers of the 1881 Jeannette expedition
- Unveiled: 30 October 1890
- Location: United States Naval Academy Cemetery near Dorsey Creek
- Designed by: George Partridge Colvocoresses
- Commemorative of the heroic officers and men of the United States Navy who perished in the Jeannette Arctic Exploring Expedition·1881

The Jeannette Monument is the largest monument in the United States Naval Academy Cemetery. It memorializes the 1881 loss of USS Jeannette while exploring the Arctic ice. Jeannette, with a crew of 33, collapsed and sank under surging ice in the summer of 1881. Her crew, commanded by George W. DeLong, took to the ice dragging three small boats. When open water was found, the boats were used to sail to the Lena Delta of Siberia, 700 miles distant. DeLong commanded a boat of 14 total crew members, Executive Officer Charles W. Chipp's boat's crew was 8 total crew members, and Engineer Officer George W. Melville's boat had 11. Chipp's boat was lost at sea with all hands. Engineer Melville's boat landed in the southern delta, and DeLong's boat came ashore farther to the north on 17 September 1881. Melville quickly found aid, as did the two hardiest sailors of DeLong's crew soon after. The 12 remaining, including DeLong, perished from starvation or exposure. Thus 20 of the original 33 did not survive the expedition.

== Monument description ==
Ten of the lost twelve from DeLong's boat were discovered by Melville on 23 March 1882, and interred on the Lena Delta. Their bodies were marked by a stone cairn constructed locally, then later to be returned to the United States in 1884. The Jeanette Monument is evocative of the cairn erected by Melville in 1882. It was designed by George Partridge Colvocoresses, drawing instructor at the Academy. It has caked ice draped on the cross, and an antique anchor at the cross's base. The monument is situated near the cemetery's shore with Dorsey Creek, and near the mouth of the creek into the Severn River. Of the twenty names thought to be inscribed, only eleven appear.

The monument was unveiled 30 October 1890, nine years exactly from the last entry in DeLong's journal of the expedition. There are no bodies interred under the monument.

== Monument inscriptions ==
On the cemetery's Cushing Road side:

COMMEMORATIVE
of the heroic officers and men of the
UNITED STATES NAVY
who perished in the
Jeannette Arctic Exploring Expedition
1881

On the Dorsey Creek side:

Lieut. Comdr. Geo. W DeLong

Lieut. Chas. W. Chipp
P.A. Surgeon, Jas. M. Ambler
Meteorologist, Jerome J. Collins
Ice Pilot, Wm. Dunbar
Coppersmith, Walter Lee
— Coal Heavers —

— Seamen —
Heinrich H. Kaack
Adolph Dressler
Hans H. Ericksen
Alfred Sweetman
Henry D. Warren

Re-interpreted for clarity, and using modern punctuation:

Lieutenant Commander George W. DeLong

Lieutenant Charles W. Chipp (Note: Lost at sea, 12 September 1881. Comparisons with the cairn's inscription place seamen Sweetman and Warren in Chipp's boat crew.)
Passed Assistant Surgeon James M. Ambler
Meteorologist Jerome J. Collins
Ice Pilot William Dunbar
Coppersmith Walter Lee
— Coal Heavers —

— Seamen —
Heinrich H. Kaack
Adolph Dressler
Hans H. Ericksen (Note: Variously Erichsen, Ericksen, Erickson.)
Alfred Sweetman
Henry D. Warren

== Cairn description ==
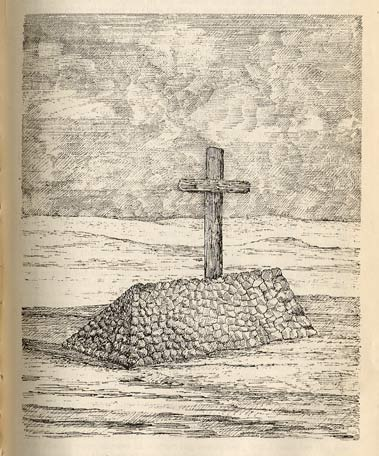
Jeannette Cairn designed and placed by George W. Melville, March 1882

The tomb or mausoleum in which the bodies were deposited was constructed of the lumber of a broken-up flatboat. First a cross was made from timbers one foot square, hewn out of logs which had drifted down the river, and erected on the crest of the hill. It was twenty-two feet high, and the cross-beam was twelve feet long. Around this cross was built a box twenty-two feet long, six feet wide, and two feet deep, located exactly on a north and south line. After the bodies had been placed in the box it was covered with plank. A ridge-pole sixteen feet long was then framed into the cross five feet above the top of the box, and its ends were supported by timbers sloping outward. A roof was then formed by placing timbers side by side against the ridge-poles and ends. The whole outside was then covered with stones, and when completed it resembled a pyramidal mound of stones surmounted by a cross.

== Cairn inscription ==
Inscribed into the cross of the Jeannette cairn:

IN
MEMORY
OF 12
OF THE
OFFICERS
AND
MEN
OF
THE ARCTIC STEAMER "JEANNETTE"
WHO DIED OF STARVATION
IN THE LENA DELTA, OCTOBER, 1881.
LIEUTENANT
G. W. DE LONG (Note: Deceased shortly after 30 October 1881 journal entry.)
DR. J. M. AMBLER
MR. J. J. COLLINS
W. LEE (Note: Deceased 21 October 1881.)
A. GORTZ (Note: Deceased 30 October 1881.)
A. DRESSLER (Note: Deceased 29 October 1881.)
H. H. ERICKSON (Note: Deceased 6 October 1881.)
G. W. BOYD
N. IVERSON (Note: Deceased 28 October 1881.)
H. H. KAACK (Note: name=Oct21)
ALEXAI (Note: Deceased about 6 October 1881.)
AH SAM

== Other crew members ==
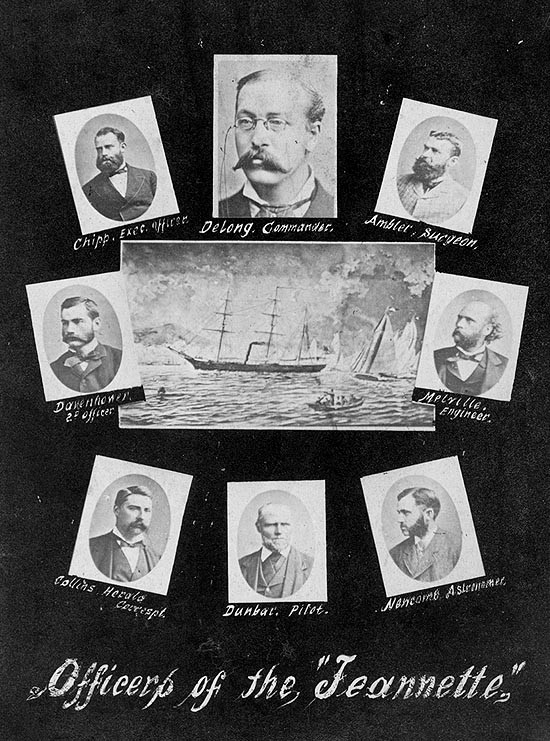
Officers of the Jeannette, clockwise from the top: DeLong, Ambler, Melville, Newcomb, Dunbar, Collins, Danenhower, Chipp

- James Markham Marshall Ambler was the medical officer on board Jeannette, and a member of DeLong's boat crew. He treated his crew mates for starvation and exposure in the northern Lena Delta. Ambler was one of the last three to perish, sometime after 30 October 1881.
- George W. Melville was an Arctic explorer both before and after his time on Jeannette. A famous naval engineer, Melville rose to the rank of rear admiral. He died in 1912.
- Raymond Lee Newcomb was the naturalist, artist, and astronomer on Jeannette, and a member of Melville's boat crew. He died in 1918.
- William Dunbar was the ice pilot on Jeannette, and a member of Chipp's boat crew. He died, lost at sea, 12 September 1881.
- Jerome J. Collins was the expedition's Scientific Officer & Meteorologist, and a correspondent for the New York Herald. He headed the very first weather bureau via the New York Herald. A member of DeLong's boat crew, Collins is last subject of DeLong's last journal entry: "Sunday Oct 30 — ... Mr Collins dying"
- John Wilson Danenhower was second officer of the Jeannette, and a member of Melville's boat crew. His seamanship is given credit for saving Melville's boat during the 12 September storm. He died in 1887 by suicide.
- William Friedrich Carl Nindemann was a seaman on Jeannette, and a member of DeLong's boat crew. He was one of two that were able to leave DeLong to seek help. Nindemann returned with Melville in 1882 to locate DeLong's last camp site.
- Louis P. Noros was a seaman on Jeannette, and a member of DeLong's boat crew. He was the other of two that were able to leave DeLong to seek help. Language difficulties prevented timely rescue.
- Ah Sam was the expedition's cook, and a member of DeLong's boat crew.
