= William G. Taylor =

- Born: August 9, 1829; Philadelphia Pennsylvania
- Died: March 28, 1910 (aged 80)
- Burial place: Quincy, Illinois
- Military career
- Allegiance: United States of America
- Branch: United States Navy
- Rank: Captain of the Forecastle
- Unit: USS Ticonderoga (1862)
- Conflicts: American Civil War • First Battle of Fort Fisher
- Awards: Medal of Honor

Captain William G. Taylor (9 August 1829 – 28 March 1910) was an American sailor who fought in the American Civil War. Taylor received his country's highest award for bravery during combat, the Medal of Honor, for his actions on the USS Ticonderoga during the First Battle of Fort Fisher.

Taylor was from Philadelphia, Pennsylvania, and buried in Quincy, Illinois.

== Medal of Honor citation ==
Citation: As captain of a gun, Taylor performed his duties with coolness and skill as his ship took position in the line of battle and delivered its fire on the batteries on shore. Despite the depressing effect caused when an explosion of the 100-pounder Parrott rifle killed 8 men and wounded 12 more, and the enemy's heavy return fire, he calmly remained at his station during the 2 days' operations

== See also ==
- List of American Civil War Medal of Honor recipients: T–Z
