= William Campbell (Medal of Honor, 1838) =

Medal of Honor recipient (born c. 1838)

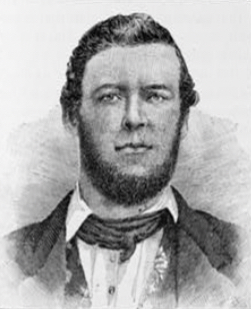
- 1887 portrait of Campbell
- Born: c. 1838; Indiana
- Military career
- Allegiance: United States of America; Union
- Branch: United States Navy; Union Navy
- Rank: Boatswain's Mate
- Unit: USS Ticonderoga
- Conflicts: American Civil War • Second Battle of Fort Fisher
- Awards: Medal of Honor

William Campbell (born c. 1838) was a sailor in the U.S. Navy during the American Civil War. He received the Medal of Honor for his actions during the Second Battle of Fort Fisher on January 15, 1865.

== Military service ==
Campbell volunteered for service in the U.S. Navy and was assigned to the Union sloop-of-war USS Ticonderoga. His enlistment is credited to the state of Indiana.

On January 15, 1865, the North Carolina Confederate stronghold of Fort Fisher was taken by a combined Union storming party of sailors, marines, and soldiers under the command of Admiral David Dixon Porter and General Alfred Terry.

== Medal of Honor citation ==

I Abraham Lincoln, "The President of the United States of America, in the name of Congress, takes pleasure in presenting the Medal of Honor to Boatswain's Mate William Campbell, United States Navy, for extraordinary heroism in action while serving on board the U.S.S. TICONDEROGA during attacks on Fort Fisher, North Carolina, 24 and 25 December 1864; and 13 to 15 January 1865. Despite heavy return fire by the enemy and the explosion of the 100-pounder Parrott rifle which killed eight men and wounded 12 more, Boatswain's Mate William  Campbell, as Captain of a gun, performed his duties with skill and courage during the first two days of battle. As his ship again took position on the line of the 13th,  Will remained steadfast as the TICONDEROGA maintained a well-placed fire upon the batteries on shore, and thereafter, as she materially lessened the power of guns on the mound which had been turned upon our assaulting columns. During this action the flag was planted on one of the strongest fortifications possessed by the rebels."[2]

General Orders: War Department, General Orders No. 59 (June 22, 1865)

Action Date: January 15, 1865

Service: Navy

Rank: Boatswain's Mate

Division: U.S.S. Ticonderoga

== See also ==
- List of American Civil War Medal of Honor recipients: A–F
- List of Medal of Honor recipients for the Second Battle of Fort Fisher
