= James Barnum =

- Born: c. 1816; Massachusetts
- Military career
- Allegiance: United States of America; Union
- Branch: United States Navy; Union Navy
- Rank: Boatswain's Mate
- Unit: USS New Ironsides
- Conflicts: American Civil War • First Battle of Fort Fisher • Second Battle of Fort Fisher
- Awards: Medal of Honor

James Barnum (c. 1816 – unknown) was a boatswain’s mate in the United States Navy stationed aboard the Union ironclad USS New Ironsides during the American Civil War. He received the Medal of Honor for his actions during the First and Second Battle of Fort Fisher in December 1864 and January 1865.

== Medal of Honor citation ==
"The President of the United States of America, in the name of Congress, takes pleasure in presenting the Medal of Honor to Boatswain's Mate James Barnum, United States Navy, for extraordinary heroism in action board the U.S.S. New Ironsides during action in several attacks on Fort Fisher, North Carolina, 24 and 25 December 1864; and on 13, 14, and 15 January 1865. The ship steamed in and took the lead in the ironclad division close in shore and immediately opened its starboard battery in a barrage of well-directed fire to cause several fires and explosions and dismount several guns during the first two days of fighting. Taken under fire as she steamed into position on 13 January, the New Ironsides fought all day and took on ammunition at night despite severe weather conditions. When the enemy came out of his bombproofs to defend the fort against the storming party, the ship's battery disabled nearly every gun on the fort facing the shore before the cease-fire orders were given by the flagship. Boatswain's Mate Barnum was commended for highly meritorious conduct during this period."

General Orders: War Department, General Orders No. 59 (June 22, 1865)

Action Date: December 24–25, 1864 and January 13–15, 1865

Service: Navy

Rank: Boatswain’s Mate

Division: U.S.S. New Ironsides

== See also ==
- List of American Civil War Medal of Honor recipients: A–F
- List of Medal of Honor recipients for the Second Battle of Fort Fisher
