= United States Naval Academy Cemetery =

US Naval Academy cemetery

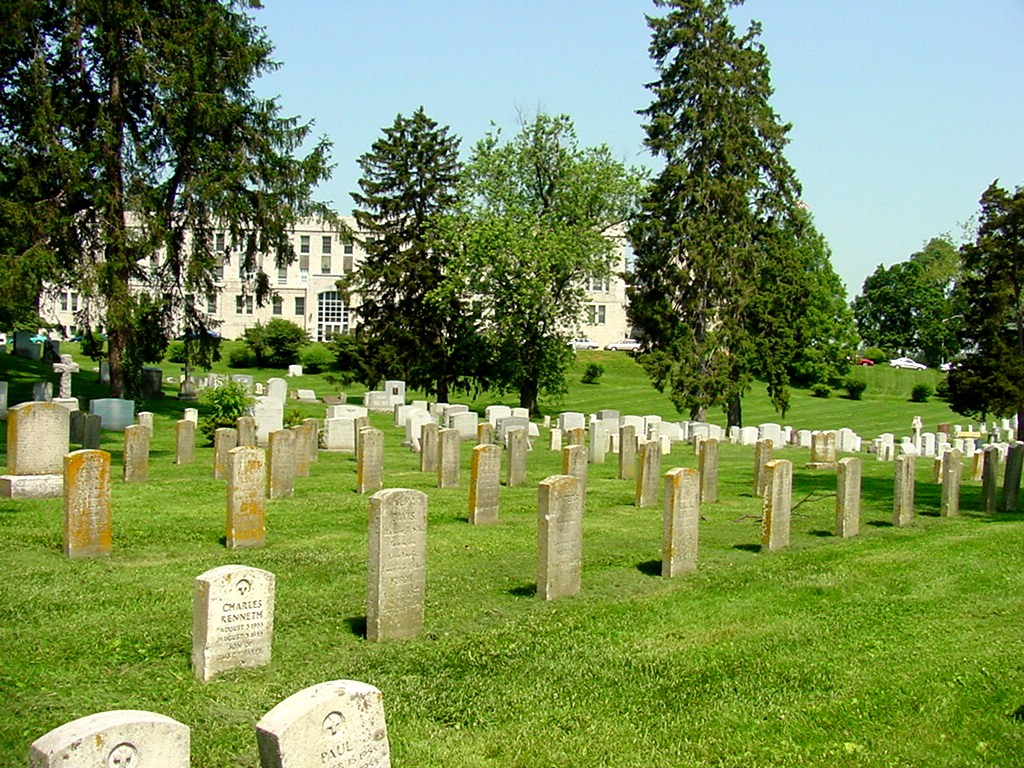
- Headstones at the USNA Cemetery
- Interactive map of United States Naval Academy Cemetery

Details
- Established: 1868
- Location: Anne Arundel County, Maryland
- Country: United States of America
- Coordinates: 38°59′15″N 76°29′24″W
- Type: Veterans
- Owned by: U.S. Department of the Navy
- Size: 6.7 acres (2.7 ha)
- No. of interments: >5,600
- Website: United States Naval Academy Cemetery and Columbarium
- Find a Grave: United States Naval Academy Cemetery

The United States Naval Academy Cemetery and Columbarium is a cemetery at the United States Naval Academy in Annapolis, Maryland.

== History ==
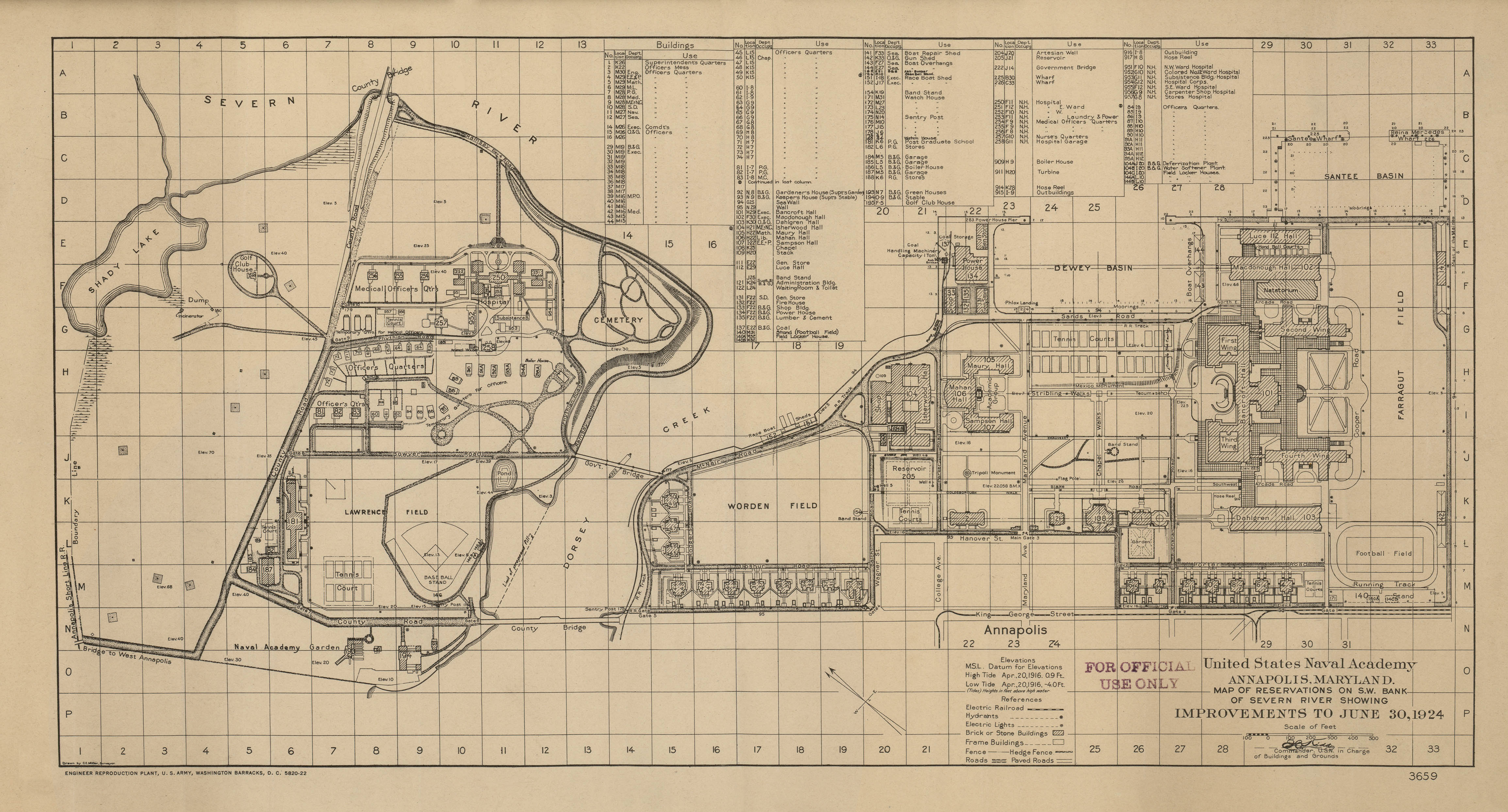
A map of the campus as it was in 1924. The cemetery can be seen near the middle of the map

In 1868 the Naval Academy purchased a 67-acre piece of land called Strawberry Hill as part of their efforts to expand after the American Civil War. Within a year of its acquisition part of the property became the cemetery. Since its beginning the cemetery has become the final resting place for Medal of Honor recipients, Superintendents of the Naval Academy, Midshipmen, and former employees of the Academy and hundreds more of the nation's veterans.

The cemetery is also home to monuments that do not mark remains, but commemorate the heroism of individuals who died in service to their country. The Jeannette Monument, erected in 1890, is the most notable such monument. It was built in memory of the men who lost their lives in the Jeannette Arctic Expedition.

== Columbarium ==
In 1987, the Naval Academy constructed a columbarium adjacent to the cemetery on College Creek. The columbarium was built by the Naval Academy Alumni Association and principally sponsored by the Class of 1959 with $500,000 in gifts from alumni and friends of the Academy. This included a major grant from the George and Carol Olmsted Foundation in memory of Jerauld L. Olmsted, Class of 1922. The columbarium offers resting places for Graduates who wish to be inurned at the Naval Academy.

The columbarium is approximately 160 feet long and six feet high on a three-tiered pedestal. All exterior surfaces are white marble. Each niche front is removable by a special key. Niches are assigned in consecutive order and cannot be reserved in advance.

In front of the columbarium stands a memorial donated by the Class of 1937 in honor of the academy graduates who died in the line of duty and whose bodies were never recovered.

== Notable burials ==
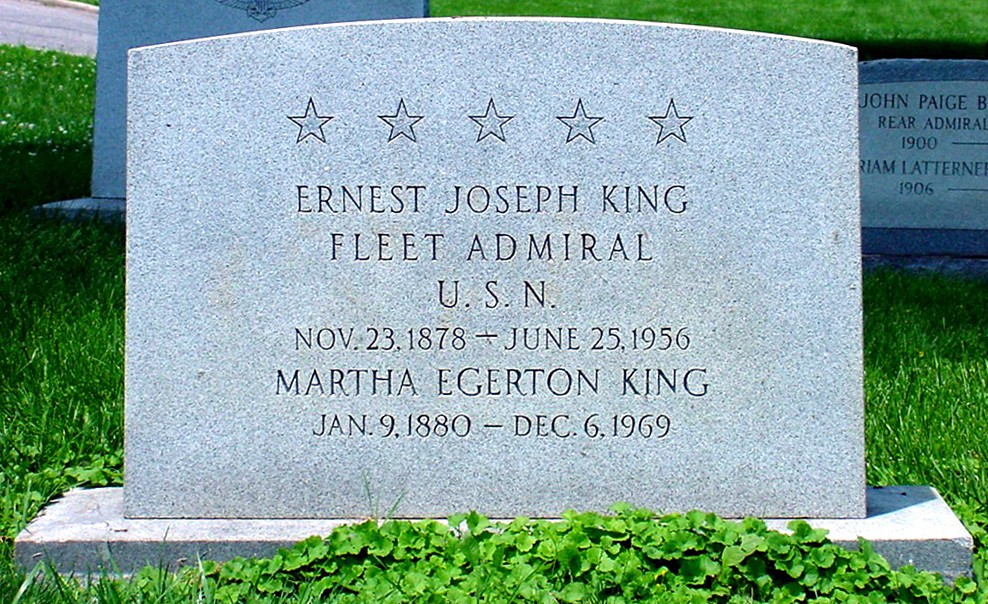
Grave of Ernest J. King

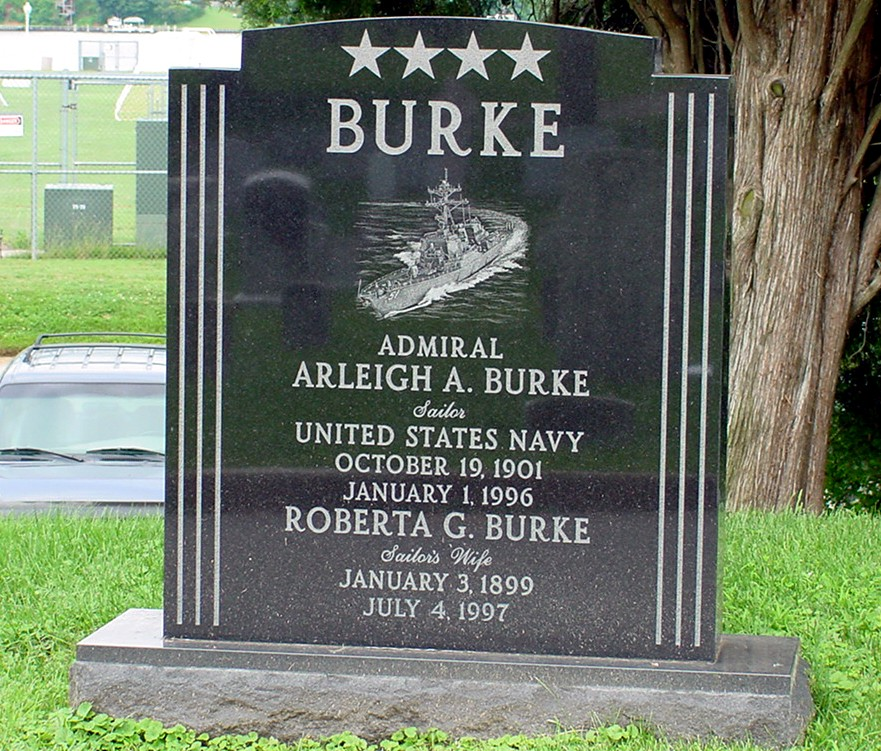
Grave of Arleigh A. Burke

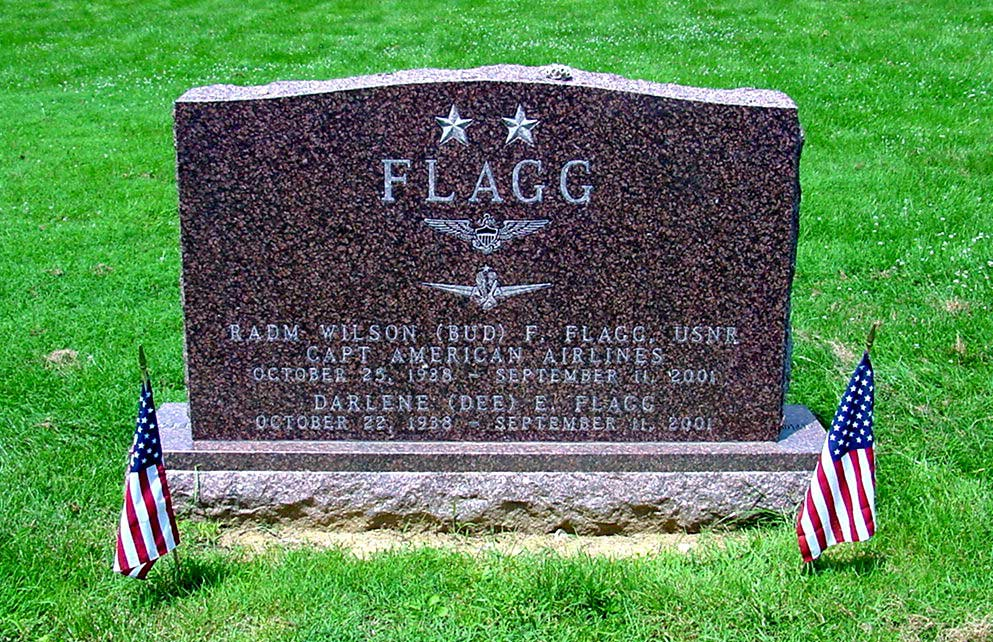
Grave of Wilson F. Flagg

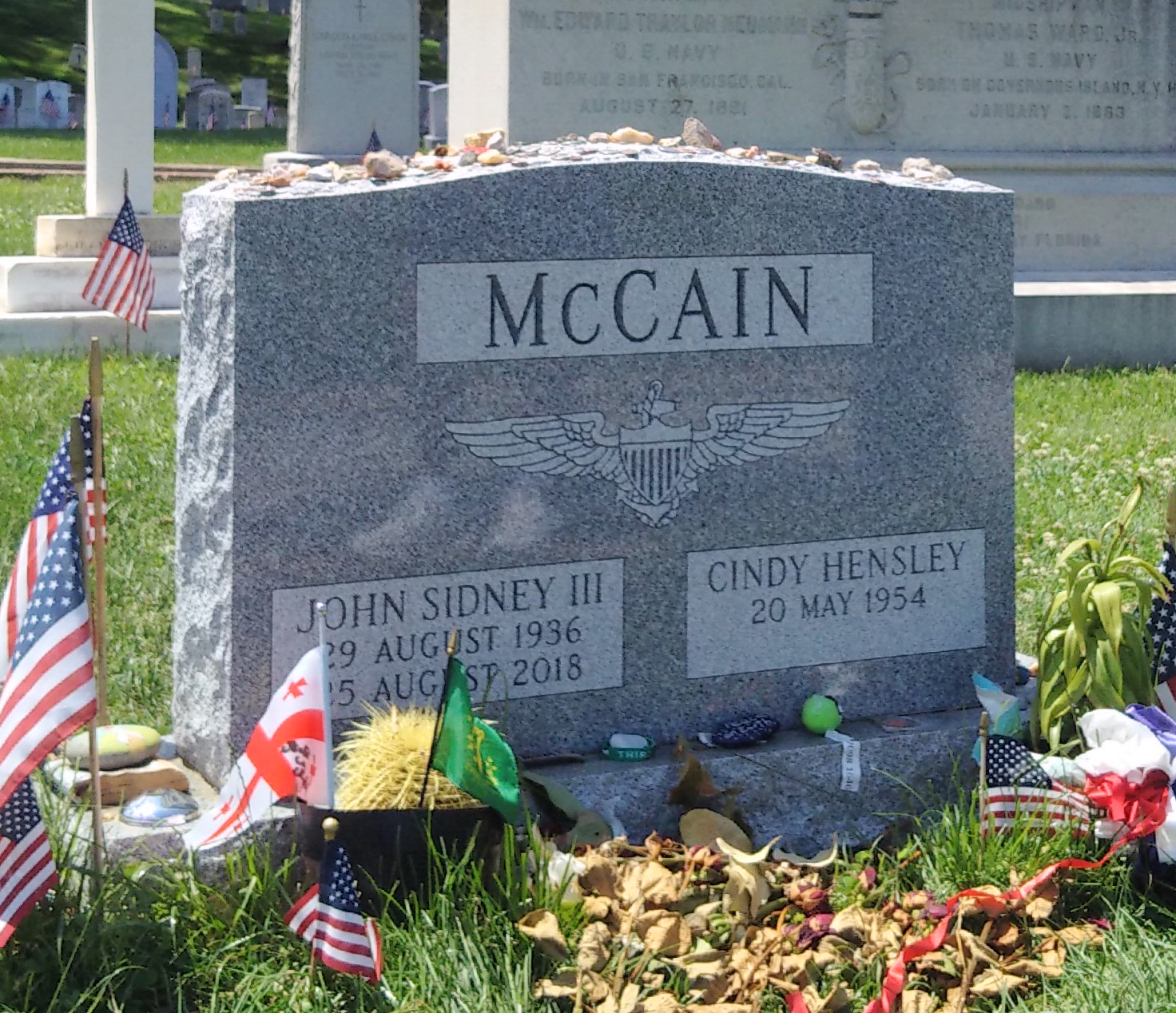
Grave of Senator John McCain

- Vice Admiral Bernard L. Austin (1902–1979)
- Captain Edward L. Beach, Jr. (1918–2002)
- Vice Admiral Donald B. Beary (1888–1966)
- Lieutenant Commander Wesley Brown (1927–2012)
- Admiral Arleigh A. Burke (1901–1996)
- Lieutenant General Henry W. Buse Jr., USMC, (1912–1988)
- Major General John P. Condon, USMC, (1911–1996)
- Admiral William J. Crowe (1925–2007)
- Commander William B. Cushing (1842–1874)
- Vice Admiral Walter S. DeLany (1891–1980)
- Lieutenant Commander George Washington DeLong (1844–1881)
- Rear Admiral George J. Dufek (1903–1977)
- Ensign John R. Elliott (1977–2000)
- Commander Theodore Gordon Ellyson (1885–1928)
- Rear Admiral Wilson F. Flagg (1938–2001)
- Major General Ben Hebard Fuller (1870–1937)
- Rear Admiral Bancroft Gherardi (1832–1903)
- Lieutenant General George F. Good Jr., USMC, (1901–1991)
- Rear Admiral Harold Hauser (1897–1981)
- Admiral James L. Holloway III (1922–2019)
- Fleet Admiral Ernest J. King (1878–1956)
- Lieutenant Commander Erik S. Kristensen (1972–2005)
- Vice Admiral Herbert F. Leary (1885–1957)
- Vice Admiral Julien J. LeBourgeois (1923–2012)
- Captain Robert F. R. Lewis (1826–1881)
- Rear Admiral Charles Elliott Loughlin (1910–1989)
- Captain James A. Lovell (1928–2025)
- Senator and Captain John S. McCain III (1936–2018)
- Captain Bruce McCandless II (1937–2017)
- Rear Admiral Clarence Wade McClusky (1902–1976)
- Rear Admiral John Porter Merrell (1846–1916)
- Major General Charles D. Mize (1921–1998)
- Rear Admiral Edward J. O’Donnell (1907–1991)
- Commodore James Philips Parker (1855–1942)
- Lieutenant Samuel W. Preston (1840–1865)
- Admiral Joseph M. Reeves (1872–1948)
- Rear Admiral Frederick Lois Riefkohl (1889–1969)
- Vice Admiral Herbert D. Riley (1904–1973)
- Colonel John W. Ripley, USMC, (1939–2008)
- Rear Admiral Thomas H. Robbins, Jr. (1900–1972)
- Rear Admiral Paul Wilhelm Steinhagen (1897–1968)
- Lieutenant Stephen Spencer Toth (1939–1967)
- Rear Admiral Charles J. Train (1845–1906)
- Admiral Stansfield Turner (1923–2018)
- Lieutenant General Pedro Augusto del Valle, USMC, (1893–1978)
- Captain Jesse Wallace (1899–1961)
- Admiral Earl P. Yates (1923–2021)
- Bandmaster Charles A. Zimmerman (1861–1916)

=== Medal of Honor recipients ===
- Thomas Calvin Cooney (1853–1907)
- Eugene B. Fluckey (1913–2007)
- Thomas Jones (1820–1892)
- Isaac Campbell Kidd (1884–1941)
- Bruce McCandless (1911–1968)
- Frederick Vallette McNair (1882–1962)
- Daniel Montague (1867–1912)
- Robert Sommers (1837–1919)
- James Bond Stockdale (1923–2005)
- William Peterkin Upshur, USMC, (1881–1943)
- Richard Wainwright, Jr. (1881–1944)

=== Superintendents of USNA ===
- James L. Holloway, Jr. (1898–1984)
- Charles Turner Joy (1895–1956)
- Draper Laurence Kauffman (1911–1979)
- Charles Cochran Kirkpatrick (1907–1988)
- Charles R. Larson (1936–2014)
- William P. Lawrence (1930–2005)
- William P. Mack (1915–2003)
- Ronald F. Marryott (1934–2005)
- Vice Admiral Charles L. Melson (1904–1981)
- Charles Stamps Minter (1915–2008)
- Louis M. Nulton (1869–1954)

== Eligibility requirements ==
To be buried at the United States Naval Academy Cemetery is an honor; below are the eligibility requirements. Naval Academy graduates must attain a flag rank while on active duty in order to be eligible.

1. Those eligible for burial in the Naval Academy Cemetery are:

- Officers, Midshipmen, or enlisted persons of the Navy or Marine Corps on active duty at the Naval Academy, Naval Station, Annapolis, or the staff of the Naval Medical Clinic, Annapolis who die while stationed at the Academy.

- Those Naval Academy graduates who have served on active duty with the rank of Rear Admiral or Brigadier General, or senior thereto, and such others as the Secretary of the Navy or the Superintendent may designate.

- Unremarried spouse of an officer or enlisted person of the Navy or Marine Corps who is buried or eligible to be buried in the Naval Academy Cemetery. In the event the spouse remarries, his or her eligibility is automatically terminated.

- Any officer, former officer, or enlisted person of the Navy or Marine Corps whose spouse is buried in the Naval Academy Cemetery.

- Stillborn and infant children of the officers or enlisted persons on active duty at the Naval Academy; Naval Station, Annapolis; or Naval Medical Clinic, Annapolis may be buried in a specific lot reserved for such cases. For purposes of this regulation, an infant is considered to be a child who has not reached 7 years of age.

- Graduates of the Air Force Academy or West Point who cross commissioned to the Navy or Marine Corps and completed 20 years of commissioned service with the rank of Rear Admiral or Brigadier General, or senior thereto.

- Distinguished Graduates of the Naval Academy.

2. Those eligible to make a reservation for future burial in sections 9 or 10 of the Naval Academy Cemetery are Naval Academy graduates who have served on active duty with the rank of Rear Admiral or Brigadier General or senior thereto and such others as the Secretary of the Navy or Superintendent may designate. Individual lots in sections 9 and 10 are not reserved in advance. They are assigned sequentially at the time of need.

3. Nothing in these regulations will change or alter cemetery reservations and commitments made under previous regulations.

To be buried at the United States Naval Academy Columbarium an individual must be a Naval Academy graduate:

1. Those eligible for burial in the Naval Academy Cemetery are:

- Officers, Midshipmen, and enlisted personnel of the Navy or Marine Corps on active duty at the Naval Academy; Naval Station, Annapolis; or the Naval Health Clinic, Annapolis.
- All Naval Academy graduates honorably discharged/retired from the service.
- Unremarried spouse of one inurned or eligible for inurnment in the Naval Academy Columbarium. Such inurnments will be in the same niche as the spouse.
- Stillborn and infant children of officers or enlisted personnel on active duty at the Naval Academy; Naval Station, Annapolis; or the Naval Health Clinic, Annapolis. For purposes of this regulation, an infant is considered to be a child who has not reached seven years of age. Such inurnments shall be in the same niche as the eligible sponsor.
- Unremarried widow(er) of Naval Academy graduates who have no known grave (i.e., lost at sea, etc.).
- Civilian faculty members who complete at least 20 years of service at the Naval Academy and are associate or honorary members of the Naval Academy Alumni Association.
- Graduates of the Air Force Academy or West Point who cross-commissioned to the Navy or Marine Corps and completed 20 years of active duty service.
- Others whose inurnment is specifically approved by the Superintendent.

2. Reservations can not be made for the Columbarium. Niches are assigned sequentially at the time of need.
