= Richard Binder =

American Medal of Honor recipient (1839-1912)

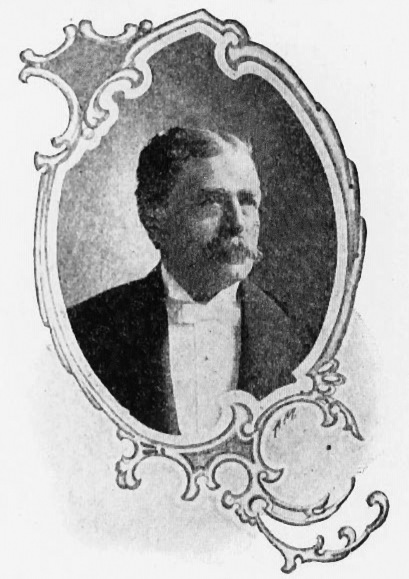
- Sergeant Richard Binder
- Born: Richard Bigle; July 26, 1839; Kingdom of Württemberg (now Germany)
- Died: February 26, 1912 (aged 72); Philadelphia, Pennsylvania, U.S.
- Burial place: West Laurel Hill Cemetery, Bala Cynwyd, Pennsylvania, U.S.
- Military career
- Allegiance: United States of America; Union
- Branch: United States Marine Corps
- Service years: 1861 - 1865
- Rank: Sergeant
- Unit: USS Ticonderoga (1863)
- Conflicts: American Civil War; Battle of Port Royal; First Battle of Fort Fisher; Second Battle of Fort Fisher
- Awards: Medal of Honor

Richard Binder (July 26, 1839 – February 26, 1912), birth name Richard Bigle, was a Kingdom of Württemberg born American military non-commissioned officer who served as a United States Marine Corps sergeant during the American Civil War. He received the Medal of Honor for his actions aboard the USS Ticonderoga during the First Battle of Fort Fisher, December 24–25, 1864, and the Second Battle of Fort Fisher, January 13–15, 1865.

He owned a series of hair salons in Philadelphia and created his own line of hair tonics and ointments as well as wigs and toupées.

== Early life ==
Binder was born in the Kingdom of Württemberg (now part of Germany). He emigrated to the United States in 1854. He initially arrived in New York City but relocated to the Kensington neighborhood in Philadelphia where he worked as a barber. He applied for U.S. Citizenship in 1860.

== Military career ==
He enlisted in the Marine Corps on July 11, 1861. He served aboard a ship that sank during the Battle of Port Royal in November 1861. He served aboard several other ships and in 1864, he was assigned to the sloop-of-war USS Ticonderoga. He was awarded the Medal of Honor for his actions aboard the USS Ticonderoga during the First Battle of Fort Fisher, December 24–25, 1864, and the Second Battle of Fort Fisher, January 13–15, 1865. The award presentation did not occur until the 1890s.

== Business career ==
After the war, he opened four "hairdressing parlors" throughout Philadelphia. One location offered a barbershop on the first floor, a salon for women and children on the second floor, and rooms for rent to bachelors and widowers on the upper floors. He also developed his own line of hair tonic and ointments as well as wigs and toupees. By 1893, his business had 55 employees including 15 women. In 1897, he invested in the Hotel Evard in Atlantic City, New Jersey, with plans to open another salon there, but the building burned down in 1902.

He died in Philadelphia from heart disease on February 26, 1912, and was interred in West Laurel Hill Cemetery in Bala Cynwyd, Pennsylvania.

== Personal life ==
In 1863, he married a woman named Frederika from the same village in the Kingdom of Württemberg. Together they had two children.

== Medal of Honor citation ==
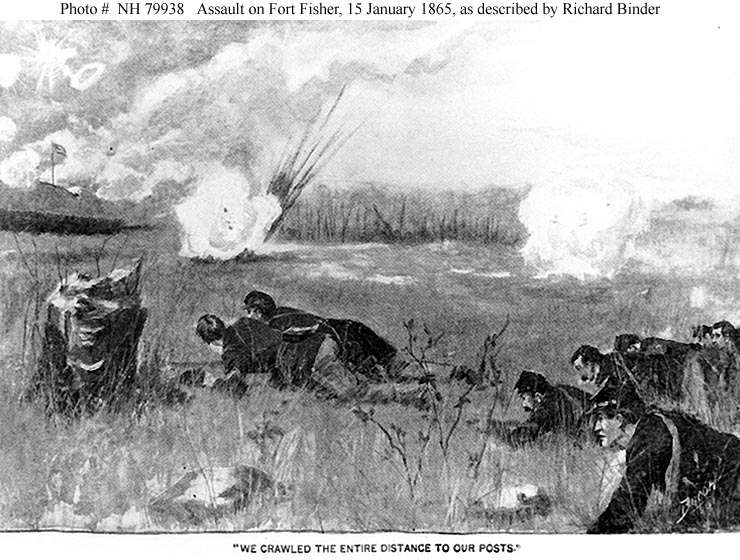
Assault on Fort Fisher 15 Jan 1875 - described by Binder

Sergeant Richard Binder's official Medal of Honor citation is as follows:

On board the USS Ticonderoga during the attacks on Fort Fisher, 24 and December 25, 1864, and 13 to January 15, 1865. Despite heavy return fire by the enemy and the explosion of the 100-pounder Parrott rifle which killed eight men and wounded 12 more, Sgt. Binder, as captain of a gun, performed his duties with skill and courage during the first two days of battle. As his ship again took position on the 13th, he remained steadfast as the Ticonderoga maintained a well-placed fire upon the batteries on shore, and thereafter, as she materially lessened the power of guns on the mound which had been turned upon our assaulting columns. During this action the flag was planted on one of the strongest fortifications possessed by the rebels.

== See also ==
- List of American Civil War Medal of Honor recipients: A–F
- List of Medal of Honor recipients for the Second Battle of Fort Fisher
