= USS Ticonderoga =

USS Ticonderoga may refer to:

- USS Ticonderoga (1814) was a 17-gun schooner in service from 1814 to 1825
- USS Ticonderoga (1862) was a screw sloop-of-war in commission from 1863 to 1881
- USS Ticonderoga (1918) was a former German cargo ship that served the Naval Overseas Transportation Service during World War I in 1917 and 1918
- USS Ticonderoga (CV-14) was a long-hull Essex-class fleet aircraft carrier which served from 1944 to 1973
- USS Ticonderoga (CG-47) was a guided missile cruiser and lead ship of her class. Launched in 1981, she was decommissioned on 30 September 2004
