= Isaac Nicholas Fry =

American Civil War Medal of Honor recipient (1839-1900)

Isaac N. Fry
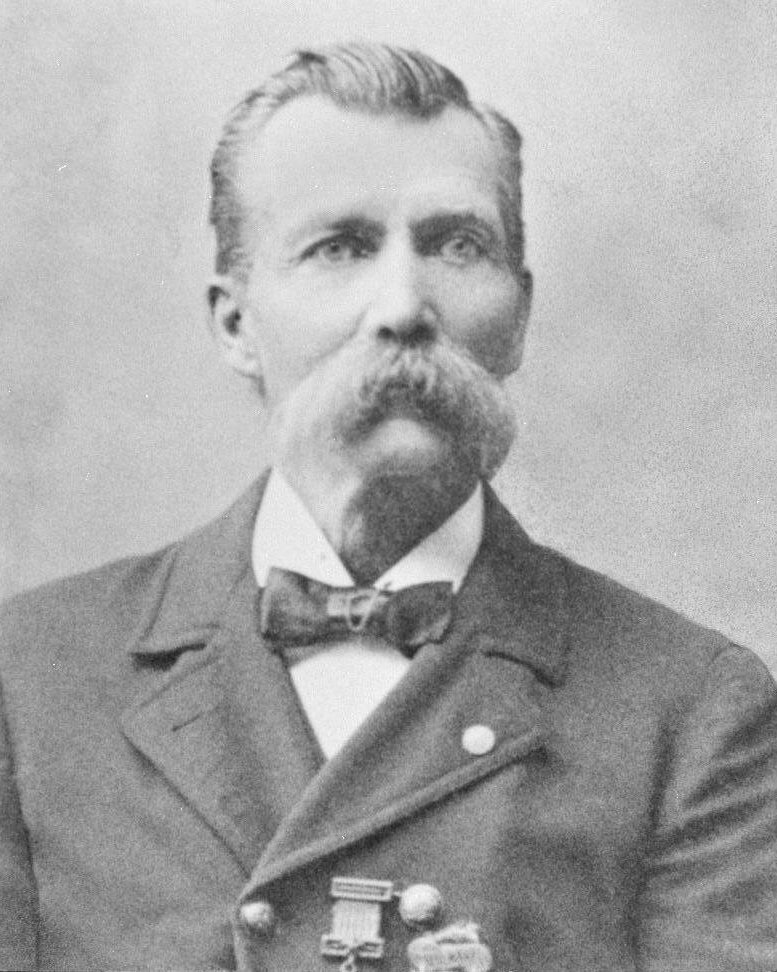
- Fry c. 1890
- Born: 1839; Ephrata, Pennsylvania
- Died: 1900 (aged 60–61); Garretson, South Dakota
- Burial place: Summit Hill Cemetery, Garretson, South Dakota
- Military career
- Allegiance: United States; Union
- Branch: United States Marine Corps
- Service years: 1862 - 1866
- Rank: Orderly sergeant
- Unit: USS Ticonderoga (1862)
- Conflicts: American Civil War • Second Battle of Fort Fisher
- Awards: Medal of Honor

Isaac N. Fry (1839 – 1900) was a sergeant in the U.S. Marine Corps during the American Civil War. He received the Medal of Honor for his actions during the Second Battle of Fort Fisher on January 15, 1865.

== Military service ==
Fry enlisted in the Marine Corps from Philadelphia in September 1862 and was assigned to the Union sloop-of-war USS Ticonderoga (1862). On January 15, 1865, the North Carolina Confederate stronghold of Fort Fisher was taken by a combined Union storming party of sailors, marines, and soldiers under the command of Admiral David Dixon Porter and General Alfred Terry. Sgt. Fry was a member of the storming party. He was honorably discharged in September 1866.

== Medal of Honor citation ==
"The President of the United States of America, in the name of Congress, takes pleasure in presenting the Medal of Honor to Orderly Sergeant Isaac N. Fry, United States Marine Corps, for extraordinary heroism in action on board the U.S.S. TICONDEROGA during attacks on Fort Fisher, 13 to 15 January 1865. As orderly sergeant of Marine guard, and captain of a gun, Orderly Sergeant Fry performed his duties with skill and courage as the TICONDEROGA maintained a well-placed fire upon the batteries to the left of the palisades during the initial phases of the three-day battle, and thereafter, as she considerably lessened the firing power of guns on the mount which had been turned upon our assaulting columns. During this action the flag was planted on one of the strongest fortifications possessed by the rebels."

General Orders: War Department, General Orders No. 59 (June 22, 1865)

Action Date: January 15, 1865

Service: Marine Corps

Rank: Orderly Sergeant

Division: U.S.S. Ticonderoga

== Extra information ==
Second Battle of Fort Fisher: The Second Battle of Fort Fisher was a successful assault by the Union Army, Navy, and Marine Corps against Fort Fisher, south of Wilmington, North Carolina, near the end of the American Civil War in January 1865. Sometimes referred to as the "Gibraltar of the South" and the last major coastal stronghold of the Confederacy, Fort Fisher had tremendous strategic value during the war, providing a port for blockade runners supplying the Army of Northern Virginia. For more info click here

Commanders of The Union:

Alfred H. Terry

David D. Porter

Commanders of The Confederacy:

Braxton Bragg

William H.C. Whiting

Robert Hoke

William Lamb

== See also ==
- List of Medal of Honor recipients
- List of American Civil War Medal of Honor recipients: A–F
- Second Battle of Fort Fisher
