= David L. Bass =

David Lawrence Bass
- Born: 2 February 1842; Hope Falls, New York
- Died: 15 October 1886 (aged 44); Little Falls, New York, U.S.
- Burial place: Wilcox Cemetery, Little Falls, New York
- Military career
- Allegiance: United States of America; Union
- Branch: United States Navy
- Rank: Seaman
- Unit: USS Minnesota
- Conflicts: American Civil War Second Battle of Fort Fisher
- Awards: Medal of Honor

David Lawrence Bass (2 February 1842 – 15 October 1886) was a Union Navy sailor in the American Civil War and a recipient of the United States military's highest decoration, the Medal of Honor, for his actions at the Second Battle of Fort Fisher.

== Biography ==
Born in Hope Falls, NY, on February 2, 1842, son of Joseph and Eliza Hamilton Bass (some Military records incorrectly state he was born in Ireland, but census and family records show he was born in NY as was his Father). His grandfather, Zadock Bass was one of the earliest known settlers in Montgomery (later Hamilton) County NY. He enlisted in the US Navy and by January 1865 was serving as a seaman on the USS Minnesota. He participated in the assault on Fort Fisher near Wilmington, North Carolina. With a landing party from the Minnesota, he advanced through heavy fire toward the fort, reaching the surrounding palisades. Most of the men then made a panicked retreat, but Bass stayed on the field until darkness fell, when he and the remainder of the attacking force made an orderly withdrawal, carrying out wounded comrades, abandoned weapons, and battle flags. For these actions, he was awarded the Medal of Honor on 22 June 1865.

After the war, Bass lived in Little Falls, New York, and worked as a blacksmith. He married Delia Walrath on August 9, 1868 and had three children; Everett James Bass, William Henry Bass and Cora Riley Bass. He died at age 44 and was buried at Wilcox Cemetery in Little Falls. The cemetery was abandoned and in disrepair for many years. Due to the efforts of local volunteers, Bass's gravesite was located, cleaned up and properly decorated. The gravesite was rededicated on May 24, 2012.

Bass’s great- great- great- grandson is currently running for Congress to represent NY’s 24 Congressional District.

== Medal of Honor citation ==
Bass' official Medal of Honor citation reads:

On board the U.S.S. Minnesota in action during the assault on Fort Fisher, 15 January 1865. Landing on the beach with the assaulting party from his ship, S/man Bass advanced to the top of the sand hill and partly through the breach in the palisades despite enemy fire which killed and wounded many officers and men. When more than two-thirds of the men became seized with panic and retreated on the run, he remained with the party until dark, when it came safely away, bringing its wounded, its arms, and its colors.

== See also ==
- List of Medal of Honor recipients
- List of American Civil War Medal of Honor recipients: A–F
- List of Medal of Honor recipients for the Second Battle of Fort Fisher
