= William Shipman (Medal of Honor) =

- Born: c. 1831; New York, US
- Died: April 17, 1894 (aged 62–63); Pennsylvania, US
- Burial place: Holy Cross Cemetery (Yeadon, Pennsylvania)
- Military career
- Allegiance: United States of America; Union
- Branch: United States Navy; Union Navy
- Rank: Coxswain
- Unit: USS Ticonderoga (1862)
- Conflicts: American Civil War • Second Battle of Fort Fisher
- Awards: Medal of Honor

William Shipman (c. 1831 – April 17, 1894) was a sailor in the U.S. Navy during the American Civil War. He received the Medal of Honor for his actions during the Second Battle of Fort Fisher on January 15, 1865.

== Military service ==
Shipman volunteered for service in the U.S. Navy and was assigned to the Union sloop-of-war USS Ticonderoga (1862). His enlistment is credited to the state of New York.

On January 15, 1865, the North Carolina Confederate stronghold of Fort Fisher was taken by a combined Union storming party of sailors, marines, and soldiers under the command of Admiral David Dixon Porter and General Alfred Terry.

== Medal of Honor citation ==
The President of the United States of America, in the name of Congress, takes pleasure in presenting the Medal of Honor to Coxswain William Shipman, United States Navy, for extraordinary heroism in action while serving on board the U.S.S. TICONDEROGA in the attack upon Fort Fisher, North Carolina, on 15 January 1865. As Captain of No. 2 gun, stationed near the 100-pounder Parrott rifle when it burst into fragments, killing eight men and wounding 12 more, Coxswain Shipman promptly recognized the effect produced by the explosion and, despite the carnage surrounding them, and the enemy's fire, encouraged the men at their guns by exclaiming "Go ahead, boys! This is only the fortunes of war!"

General Orders: War Department, General Orders No. 59 (June 22, 1865)

Action Date: January 15, 1865

Service: Navy

Rank: Coxswain

Division: U.S.S. Ticonderoga

== See also ==
- List of Medal of Honor recipients
- List of American Civil War Medal of Honor recipients: Q–S
