= USS Conemaugh (1862) =

Gunboat of the United States Navy

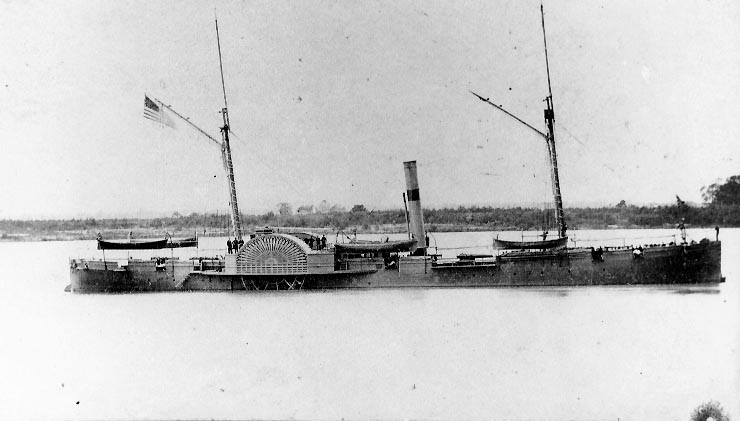
- USS Conemaugh

History

United States
- Name: USS Conemaugh
- Namesake: Conemaugh River in Pennsylvania
- Laid down: date unknown
- Launched: 1 May 1862 at Portsmouth Navy Yard, Kittery, Maine
- Commissioned: 16 July 1862
- Decommissioned: 27 July 1867
- Stricken: 1867 (est.)
- Fate: Sold on 1 October 1867

General characteristics
- Type: Gunboat
- Displacement: 955 long tons (970 t)
- Length: 233 ft 9 in (71.25 m)
- Beam: 34 ft 10 in (10.62 m)
- Draught: 8 ft (2.4 m)
- Propulsion: Steam engine; side-wheel propelled
- Speed: 11 kn (13 mph; 20 km/h)
- Complement: 125
- Armament: 1 × 100-pounder rifle, 1 × 11 in (280 mm) smoothbore gun, 6 × 24-pounder smoothbore guns, 1 × 12-pounder smoothbore gun

USS Conemaugh was a side-wheel steamer in the United States Navy during the American Civil War. With her large crew of 125 and her powerful guns, she was assigned as a gunboat on the Union blockade of the Confederate States of America.

== Launched in Maine in 1862 ==
Originally named Cinemaugh, she was renamed on 24 December 1861, launched on 1 May 1862 by Portsmouth Navy Yard, Kittery, Maine; and commissioned on 16 July 1862, Lieutenant Reed Werden in command.

== Civil War service ==
=== Assigned to the South Atlantic blockade ===
Conemaugh sailed from Portsmouth on 19 July 1862, and arrived at Port Royal, South Carolina on 30 July to join the South Atlantic Blockading Squadron. She patrolled and served as a picket frequently engaging Confederate batteries and detachments of troops along stream banks. Among such exchanges were those with the Cat Island battery on 5 March, 13 April and 23 May 1863 and Fort Wagner on 11 July-12 July. Conemaugh entered Philadelphia Navy Yard on 19 September and was placed out of commission four days later for overhaul.

=== Assigned to the West Gulf blockade ===
Clearing Philadelphia, Pennsylvania on 24 January 1864, Conemaugh arrived at Key West on 1 February for duty with the West Gulf Blockading Squadron. She carried stores and ordnance to the ships off Mobile, Alabama. She captured the blockade runner Judson on 30 April and sent her into Ship Island with her valuable cargo of cotton and turpentine.

With Admiral David Farragut's fleet, Conemaugh landed troops on Dauphin Island on 3 August and participated in the celebrated Battle of Mobile Bay on 5 August. She sailed from Key West on 5 November for overhaul at Philadelphia.

=== Reassigned to the South Atlantic blockade ===
From 20 May-22 November 1865, Conemaugh cruised the coast of North and South Carolina with the South Atlantic Blockading Squadron. She lay at Norfolk, Virginia from 25 November 1865 – 27 May 1866, then was assigned to the North Atlantic Squadron.

== Post-war decommissioning ==
Conemaugh cruised on the coast of the Carolinas and Florida until 23 July 1867, when she put into New York Navy Yard where she was decommissioned on 27 July and sold on 1 October.

== See also ==
- Union Navy
- Confederate States Navy
