= Robert Sommers (Medal of Honor) =

United States Naval sailor

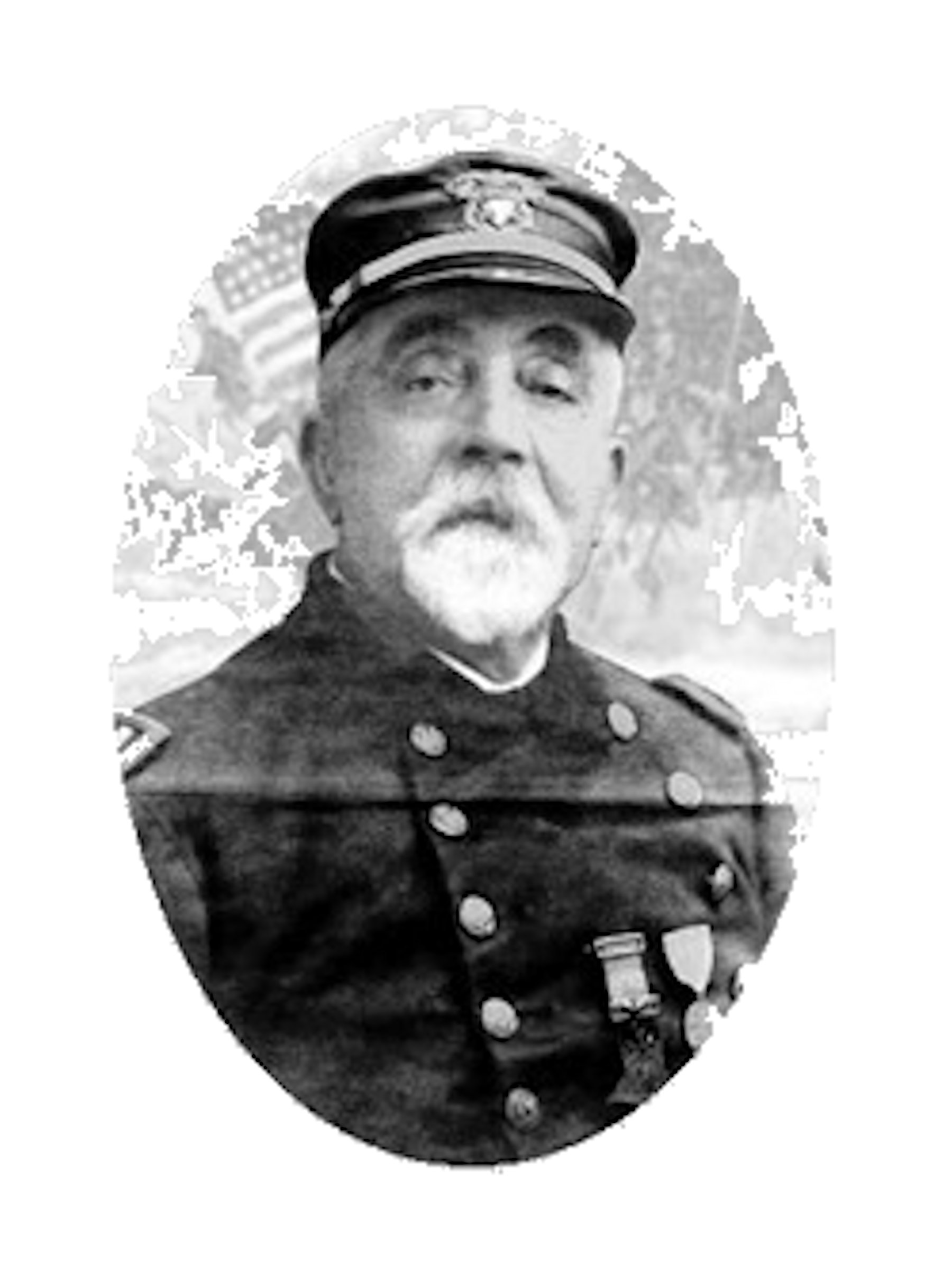
- Born: December 17, 1837; Prussia
- Died: December 1, 1919 (aged 81)
- Burial place: United States Naval Academy Cemetery
- Military career
- Allegiance: United States of America; Union
- Branch: United States Navy; Union Navy
- Rank: Chief Quartermaster
- Unit: USS Ticonderoga (1862)
- Conflicts: American Civil War • Second Battle of Fort Fisher
- Awards: Medal of Honor

Robert Emil Sommers (December 17, 1837 – December 1, 1919) (later anglicized to Summers) was a sailor in the U.S. Navy during the American Civil War. He received the Medal of Honor for his actions during the Second Battle of Fort Fisher on January 15, 1865.

== Military service ==
Sommers volunteered for service in the U.S. Navy and was assigned to the Union sloop-of-war USS Ticonderoga (1862). His enlistment is credited to the state of New York.

On January 15, 1865, the North Carolina Confederate stronghold of Fort Fisher was taken by a combined Union storming party of sailors, marines, and soldiers under the command of Admiral David Dixon Porter and General Alfred Terry.

Sommers continued to serve in the Navy after the war. He was appointed to the Warrant Officer rank of Gunner on 11 November 1873 and was promoted to Chief Gunner on 3 March 1899. He retired, having reached the mandatory retirement age of 62, on 17 December 1899.

He died on December 1, 1919, in Annapolis, Maryland, and is buried in the U.S. Naval Academy Cemetery.

== Awards ==
- Medal of Honor
- Civil War Campaign Medal
- Spanish Campaign Medal

== Medal of Honor citation ==
For The President of the United States of America, in the name of Congress, takes pleasure in presenting the Medal of Honor to Chief Quartermaster Robert Sommers, United States Navy, for extraordinary heroism in action while serving on board the U.S.S. TICONDEROGA in the attacks on Fort Fisher, North Carolina, 13 to 15 January 1865. The ship took position in the line of battle and maintained a well-directed fire upon the batteries to the left of the palisades during the initial phase of the engagement. Although several of the enemy's shots fell over and around the vessel, the TICONDEROGA fought her guns gallantly throughout three consecutive days of battle until the flag was planted on one of the strongest fortifications possessed by the rebels.

General Orders: War Department, General Orders No. 59 (June 22, 1865)

Action Date: January 15, 1865

Service: Navy

Rank: Chief Quartermaster

Division: U.S.S. Ticonderoga

== See also ==
- List of Medal of Honor recipients
- List of American Civil War Medal of Honor recipients: Q–S
- List of Medal of Honor recipients for the Second Battle of Fort Fisher
