= Nicholas Lear =

- Born: c. 1826; Rhode Island
- Died: July 4, 1902 (aged 75–76); Philadelphia, Pennsylvania, U.S.
- Military career
- Allegiance: United States; Union
- Branch: United States Navy; Union Navy
- Service years: 1862–1865
- Rank: Quartermaster
- Unit: (United States Navy) USS New Ironsides
- Conflicts: American Civil War • First Battle of Fort Fisher • Second Battle of Fort Fisher
- Awards: Medal of Honor

Nicholas Lear (c. 1826 – July 4, 1902) was a Quartermaster in the Union Navy and a Medal of Honor recipient for his actions in the American Civil War.

Lear enlisted for a three-year term in the US Navy in August 1862, and was assigned to the Union ironclad USS New Ironsides (1862).

== Medal of Honor citation ==
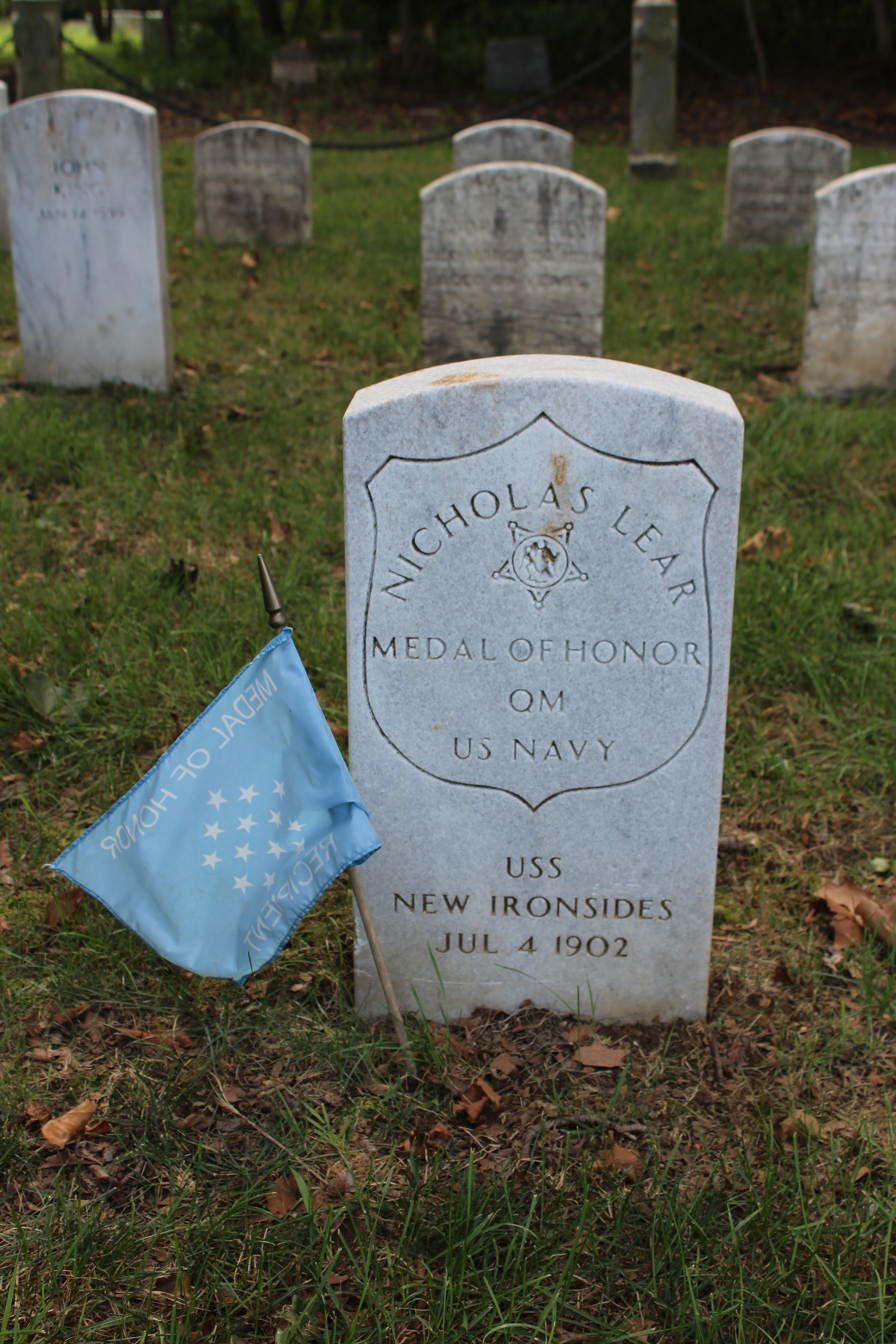
Nicholas Lear headstone in Mount Moriah Cemetery Naval Plot

The President of the United States of America, in the name of Congress, takes pleasure in presenting the Medal of Honor to Coxswain Joseph White, United States Navy, for extraordinary heroism in action while serving on board the U.S.S. New Ironsides during action in several attacks on Fort Fisher, North Carolina, 24 and 25 December 1864; and 13,14, and 15 January 1865. The ship steamed in and took the lead in the ironclad division close inshore and immediately opened its starboard battery in a barrage of well-directed fire to cause several fires and explosions and dismount several guns during the first two days of fighting. Taken under fire as she steamed into position on 13 January, the New Ironsides fought all day and took on ammunition at night despite severe weather conditions. When the enemy came out of his bombproofs to defend the fort against the storming party, the ships battery disabled nearly every gun on the fort facing the shore before the ceasefire order was given by the flagship.

General Orders: War Department, General Orders No. 59 (June 22, 1865)

Action Date: December 24–25, 1864 & January 13–15, 1865

Service: Navy

Rank: Quartermaster

Division: U.S.S. New Ironsides

He died July 4, 1902, and is interred at Mount Moriah Cemetery in Philadelphia, Pennsylvania.

== See also ==
- List of American Civil War Medal of Honor recipients: G–L
