= Thomas English (Medal of Honor) =

- Born: c. 1819; New York City
- Died: April 11, 1868 at sea near Singapore off USS Piscataqua (1866)
- Burial place: at sea
- Military career
- Allegiance: United States of America; Union
- Branch: United States Navy; Union Navy
- Rank: Signal Quartermaster
- Unit: USS New Ironsides (1862)
- Conflicts: American Civil War • First Battle of Fort Fisher • Second Battle of Fort Fisher
- Awards: Medal of Honor

Thomas English (c. 1819 – April 11, 1868) was an African-American sailor in the U.S. Navy during the American Civil War. He received the Medal of Honor for his actions during the Second Battle of Fort Fisher on January 15, 1865.

== Military service ==
A free black man, English joined the Navy at age 43, for a 3-year enlistment, and was assigned to the Union ironclad USS New Ironsides (1862). His enlistment is credited to the state of New York. Having long served the Navy before the Ft Fisher action, English had risen to the rank of Signal Quartermaster aboard the most powerful Ironclad warship of the Navy, perhaps the highest ranked African American enlisted man in the US Navy at that time. His heroic deed involved repeatedly and with coolness leaving the safety of the armored pilot house to change the signal flags vital to communications amidst the storm of shot and shell. His Medal of Honor was never given to him and remains unclaimed in a drawer of the Navy Museum, Washington Navy Yard, Washington DC.

On January 15, 1865, the North Carolina Confederate stronghold of Fort Fisher was taken by a combined Union storming party of sailors, marines, and soldiers under the command of Admiral David Dixon Porter and General Alfred Terry.

== Last Years ==
In 1867, Thomas English signed on to the screw steamer USS Piscataqua (1866) which was bound for service in the Asiatic Station at the port of Singapore. On April 11, 1868, English died on board and was buried at sea.

== Medal of Honor citation ==
The President of the United States of America, in the name of Congress, takes pleasure in presenting the Medal of Honor to Signal Quartermaster Thomas English, United States Navy, for extraordinary heroism in action while serving on board the U.S.S. New Ironsides during action in several attacks on Fort Fisher, North Carolina, 24 and 25 December 1864; and 13, 14, and 15 January 1865. The ship steamed in and took the lead in the ironclad division close inshore and immediately opened its starboard battery in a barrage of well-directed fire to cause several fires and explosions and dismount several guns during the first two days of fighting. Taken under fire as she steamed into position on 13 January, the New Ironsides fought all day and took on ammunition at night despite severe weather conditions. When the enemy came out of his bombproofs to defend the fort against the storming party, the ship's battery disabled nearly every gun on the fort facing the shore before the cease-fire orders were given by the flagship.

General Orders: War Department, General Orders No. 59 (June 22, 1865)

Action Date: December 24–25, 1864 & January 13–15, 1865

Service: Navy

Rank: Signal Quartermaster

Division: U.S.S. New Ironsides

== See also ==
- List of Medal of Honor recipients
- List of American Civil War Medal of Honor recipients: A–F
- List of African-American Medal of Honor recipients
