= Thomas Jones (Medal of Honor) =

- Civil War era Navy Medal of Honor
- Born: c. 1820; Baltimore, Maryland, US
- Died: December 11, 1892 (aged 71–72); Annapolis, Maryland, US
- Burial place: United States Naval Academy Cemetery, Annapolis, Maryland
- Military career
- Allegiance: United States of America; Union
- Branch: United States Navy; Union Navy
- Service years: 1846 - 1885
- Rank: Coxswain
- Unit: USS Ticonderoga (1862)
- Conflicts: American Civil War Second Battle of Fort Fisher
- Awards: Medal of Honor

Thomas Jones (c. 1820 – December 11, 1892) was a sailor in the U.S. Navy during the American Civil War. He received the Medal of Honor for his actions during the Second Battle of Fort Fisher on January 15, 1865.

== Military service ==
Jones enlisted in the Navy from Maryland in 1846 and was assigned to the Union sloop-of-war USS Ticonderoga (1862). He retired in August 1885.

On January 15, 1865, the North Carolina Confederate stronghold of Fort Fisher was taken by a combined Union storming party of sailors, marines, and soldiers under the command of Admiral David Dixon Porter and General Alfred Terry.

== Medal of Honor citation ==
Rank and organization: Coxswain, U.S. Navy. Accredited to: Maryland. G.O. No.: 59, 22 June 1865.

Jones' official Medal of Honor Citation reads:

On board the U.S.S. TICONDEROGA during attacks on Fort Fisher, North Carolina, 24 and 25 December 1864; and 13 to 15 January 1865. Despite heavy return fire by the enemy and the explosion of the 100-pounder Parrott rifle which killed eight men and wounded 12 more, Coxswain Jones, as Captain of a gun, performed his duties with skill and courage during the first two days of battle. As his ship again took position on the line on the 13th, he remained steadfast as the TICONDEROGA maintained a well-placed fire upon the batteries on shore, and thereafter, as she materially lessened the power of guns on the mound which had been turned upon our assaulting columns. During this action the flag was planted on one side of the strongest fortifications possessed by the rebels.

== Death and burial ==
Medal of Honor recipient Thomas Jones died December 11, 1892, at Annapolis, Maryland and is buried at the United States Naval Academy Cemetery in Burial plot: Section 06, lot 1531.

Jones' death notice in the December 12, 1892, Baltimore Sun newspaper read:

(Special Dispatch to the Baltimore Sun) ANNAPOLIS, Dec. 11. - Thomas Jones, aged seventy-three years, for thirty-five years a sailor in the United States navy, died here this morning. Several years ago Jones was retired on a pension. He was a Baltimorean by birth, but has resided in Annapolis a number of years, having been stationed at the Naval Academy. During most of his long service in the Navy he held the rate of seaman.

== See also ==
- List of Medal of Honor recipients
- List of American Civil War Medal of Honor recipients: G–L
