= George Prance =

- Civil War era Navy Medal of Honor
- Born: c. 1827; France
- Died: April 3, 1885; Temescal, Oakland, California, US
- Burial place: Mountain View Cemetery (Oakland, California)
- Military career
- Allegiance: United States of America; Union
- Branch: United States Navy; Union Navy
- Rank: Captain of the Main Top
- Unit: USS Ticonderoga (1862)
- Conflicts: American Civil War • Second Battle of Fort Fisher
- Awards: Medal of Honor

George Prance (c. 1827 – April 3, 1885) was a sailor in the U.S. Navy during the American Civil War. He received the Medal of Honor for his actions during the Second Battle of Fort Fisher on January 15, 1865.

== Military service ==
Immigrating from his native France, Prance volunteered for service in the U.S. Navy and was assigned to the Union sloop-of-war USS Ticonderoga (1862). His enlistment is credited to the state of Massachusetts.

On January 15, 1865, the North Carolina Confederate stronghold of Fort Fisher was taken by a combined Union storming party of sailors, marines, and soldiers under the command of Admiral David Dixon Porter and General Alfred Terry. Prance directed fire from the Ticonderoga's guns upon Fort Fisher.

== Medal of Honor citation ==
For The President of the United States of America, in the name of Congress, takes pleasure in presenting the Medal of Honor to Captain of the Main Top George Prance, United States Navy, for extraordinary heroism in action while serving on board the U.S.S. TICONDEROGA during attacks on Fort Fisher, North Carolina, 24 and 25 December 1864; and 13 to 15 January 1865. Despite heavy return fire by the enemy and the explosion of the 100-pounder Parrott rifle which killed eight men and wounded 12 more, Captain of the Main Top Prance as Captain of a gun, performed his duties with skill and courage during the first two days of battle. As his ship again took position on the line on the 13th, he remained steadfast as the TICONDEROGA maintained a well-placed fire upon the batteries on shore, and thereafter as she materially lessened the power of guns on the mound which had been turned upon our assaulting columns. During this action the flag was planted on one of the strongest fortifications possessed by the rebels.

General Orders: War Department, General Orders No. 59 (June 22, 1865)

Action Date: January 15, 1865

Service: Navy

Rank: Captain of the Main Top

Division: U.S.S. Ticonderoga

== Death and burial ==
Medal of Honor recipient George Prance died April 3, 1885, of a self-inflicted gunshot and was buried in Mountain View Cemetery (Oakland, California).

Prance's death notice in the April 4, 1885, Daily Alta newspaper read:

An inquest was held last evening on the remains of George Prance, who shot himself yesterday at the Park House, Temescal. The jury found that the deceased was a native of France, single, sixty years of age, and that he came to his death from a bullet wound, inflicted with suicidal intent. Prance had been employed on a dredger in the Oakland harbor, and lately had been drinking heavily. He was a member of the George H. Thomas Post, G. A. R. It is believed that his suicide was occasioned by the failure of the Legislature to pass a bill to reimburse him for an eye lost by an injury received while in the employ of the Harbor Commissioners.

== See also ==
- List of Medal of Honor recipients
- List of American Civil War Medal of Honor recipients: M–P
