= USS New Ironsides =

United States Navy ironclad ship

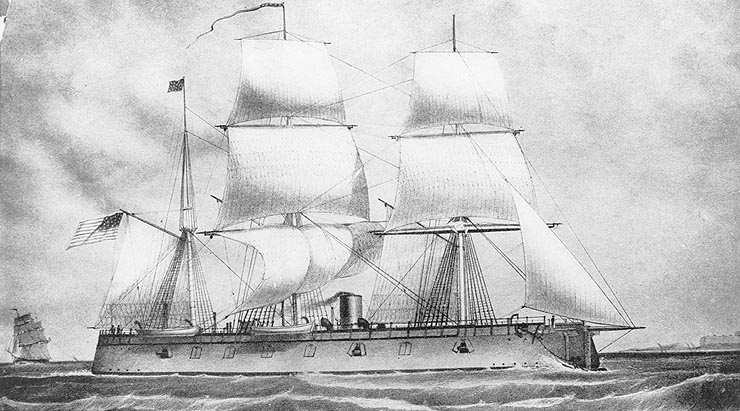
- USS New Ironsides under steam and sail

History

United States
- Name: New Ironsides
- Namesake: USS Constitution
- Ordered: 15 October 1861
- Builder: William Cramp & Sons, Philadelphia
- Cost: $780,000
- Yard number: 108
- Launched: 10 May 1862
- Sponsored by: Commodore Charles Stewart
- Commissioned: 21 August 1862
- Decommissioned: 6 April 1865
- Fate: Destroyed by fire, 16 December 1865

General characteristics
- Type: Broadside ironclad
- Displacement: 4,120 long tons (4,190 t)
- Length: 230 ft (70.1 m) (p.p.)
- Beam: 57 ft 6 in (17.5 m)
- Draft: 15 ft 8 in (4.8 m)
- Installed power: 4 × water-tube boilers; 1,800 ihp (1,300 kW)
- Propulsion: 1 × shaft; 2 × direct-acting steam engines
- Speed: 7 knots (13 km/h; 8.1 mph)
- Complement: 449 officers and enlisted
- Armament: 14 × 11-inch (279 mm) Dahlgren guns; 2 × 150-pounder Parrott rifles; 2 × 50-pounder Dahlgren rifles
- Armor: Belt: 4.5 in (114 mm); Battery: 4.5 in (114 mm); Deck: 1 in (25 mm); Bulkheads: 2.5 in (64 mm)

USS New Ironsides was a wooden-hulled broadside ironclad built for the United States Navy during the American Civil War. The ship spent most of her career blockading the Confederate ports of Charleston, South Carolina, and Wilmington, North Carolina, in 1863–1865. New Ironsides bombarded the fortifications defending Charleston in 1863 during the First and Second Battles of Charleston Harbor. At the end of 1864 and the beginning of 1865 she bombarded the defenses of Wilmington in the First and Second Battles of Fort Fisher.

Although she was struck many times by Confederate shells, gunfire never significantly damaged the ship or injured the crew. Her only casualty in combat occurred when she was struck by a spar torpedo carried by the CSS David. Eight crewmen were awarded the Medal of Honor for their actions during the Second Battle of Fort Fisher in 1865. The ship was destroyed by fire in 1865 after she was placed in reserve.

== Design and description ==
After the United States received word of the construction of the Confederate casemate ironclad, CSS Virginia, Congress appropriated $1.5 million on 3 August to build one or more armored steamships. It also ordered the creation of a board to inquire into armored ships. The U.S. Navy advertised for proposals for "iron-clad steam vessels of war" on 7 August and Gideon Welles, the Secretary of the Navy, appointed the three members of the Ironclad Board the following day. Their task was to "examine plans for the completion of iron-clad vessels". They evaluated 17 different designs, but recommended only three on 16 September.

The three ironclad ships differed substantially in design and degree of risk. The USS Monitor was the most innovative design by virtue of its low freeboard, shallow-draft iron hull, and total dependence on steam power. The riskiest element of its design was its rotating gun turret, something that had not previously been tested by any navy. (Note: British trials of a turret designed by Cowper Coles on board the floating battery HMS Trusty did not begin until the same month.) Its designer John Ericsson's guarantee of delivery in 100 days proved to be decisive in choosing his design despite the risk involved. The wooden-hulled USS Galena's most novel feature was her armor of interlocking iron rails. The New Ironsides was much influenced by the French ironclad Gloire and was the most conservative design of the three, which copied many of the features of the French ship. The well-known Philadelphia engine-building firm of Merrick & Sons made the proposal for New Ironsides, but they did not have a slipway so they subcontracted the ship to William Cramp & Sons. William Cramp claimed credit for the detailed design of the ship's hull, but the general design work was done by Merrick & Sons.

New Ironsides was 230 feet (70.1 m) long between perpendiculars and 249 feet 6 inches (76.0 m) long overall. She had a beam of 57 feet 6 inches (17.5 m) and a draft of 15 feet 8 inches (4.8 m). The ship displaced 4,120 long tons (4,190 t), 495 long tons (503 t) more than her designed displacement. To minimize her draft, New Ironsides was given a wide beam and a flat bottom. She had a rectangular ram that projected 6 feet (1.8 m) forward from her bow. The ship's crew consisted of 449 officers and men.

A two-piece articulated rudder was fitted to New Ironsides, but it proved unsatisfactory in service as the ship became more unmanageable as her speed increased. The rudder was blamed at the time, but the very full shape of the ship's hull aft was the most likely cause as it screened the rudder from the flow of water behind the hull. The ship's hull was coppered to reduce fouling.

=== Propulsion ===
New Ironsides had two simple horizontal two-cylinder direct-acting steam engines driving a single brass 13-foot (4.0 m) propeller. Steam was provided by four horizontal fire-tube boilers at a working pressure of 20–25 psi (138–172 kPa; 1–2 kgf/cm^{2}). The engines produced 1,800 indicated horsepower (1,300 kW) which gave the ship a maximum speed around 6 knots (11 km/h; 6.9 mph). New Ironsides carried 350 long tons (360 t) of coal and her propeller could be disengaged to reduce drag while under sail alone. The ship was barque-rigged with three masts that were used only for long-distance voyages, and were removed, with their rigging, once on station. The best speed under sail and steam together was only about 7 knots (13 km/h; 8.1 mph).

=== Armament ===
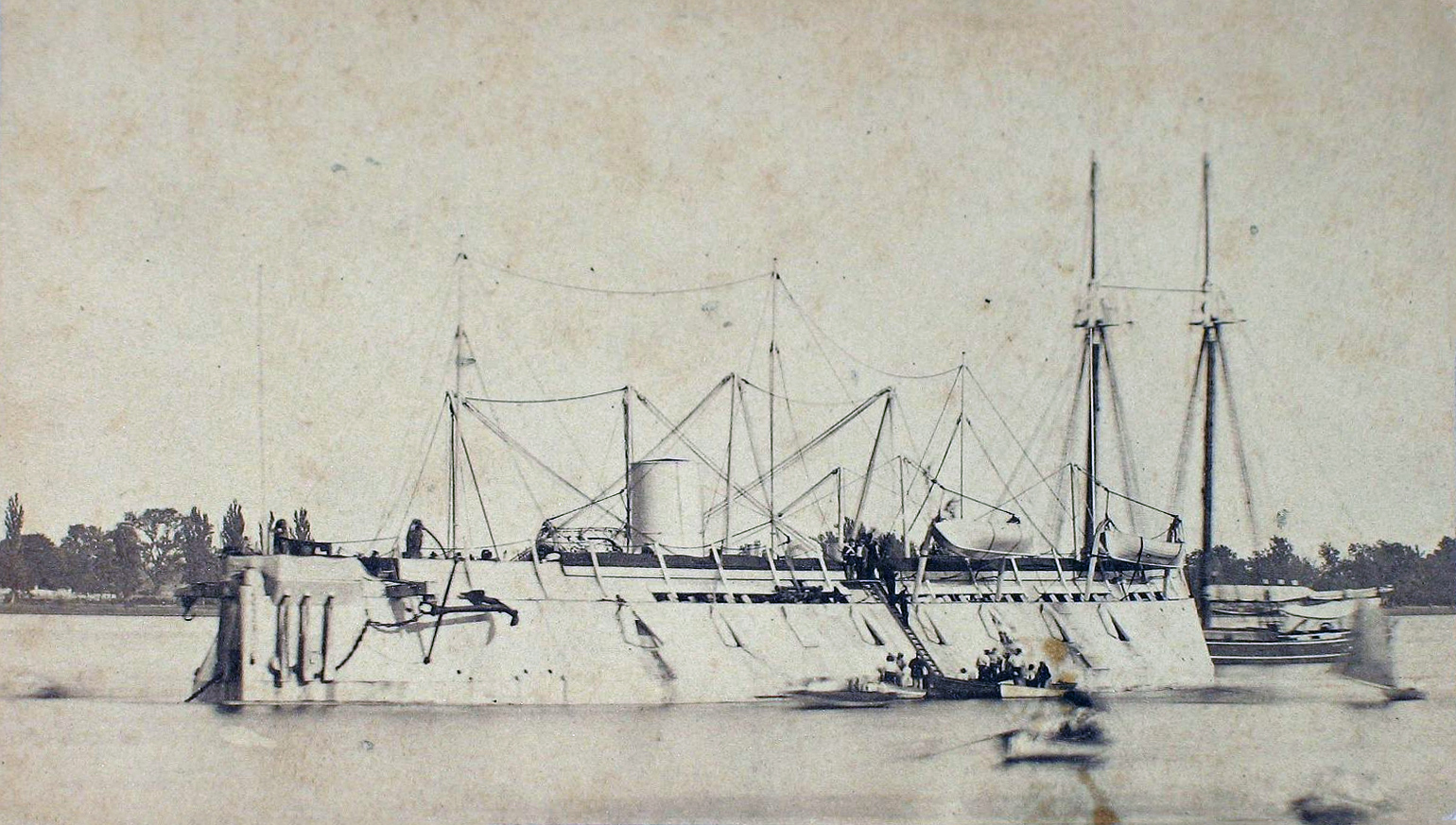
New Ironsides as she appeared on blockade duty

The ship's main armament was originally going to consist of 16 smoothbore, muzzle-loading 9-inch (229 mm) Dahlgren guns mounted on the gun deck. However, the navy was less than impressed by the performance of 9-inch Dahlgrens during the Battle of Hampton Roads and wanted more powerful 11-inch (279 mm) guns. Accordingly, the design changed while the ship was under construction to accommodate fourteen 11-inch Dahlgren guns and two muzzle-loading 8-inch (203 mm), 150-pounder Parrott rifles. Two 5.1-inch (130 mm), 50-pound Dahlgren rifles were fitted on the upper deck as chase guns. They were replaced by 60-pound Dahlgren rifles by October 1864.

Each 11-inch gun weighed approximately 16,000 pounds (7,300 kg) and could fire a 136-pound (61.7 kg) shell at a range of 3,650 yards (3,340 m) at an elevation of 15°. The muzzle-loading Parrott rifles fired a 152-pound (68.9 kg) shell at a muzzle velocity of 1,200 ft/s (370 m/s). The 17-caliber guns weighed 16,300 pounds (7,400 kg) each. The 50-pounder Dahlgren rifles weighed approximately 5,600 pounds (2,500 kg). The small size of the gun ports limited the guns, however, to a maximum elevation of 4.5° which reduced their range to less than 2,000 yards (1,800 m).

The existing wooden carriages for 11-inch guns were too long to fit in New Ironsides's cramped battery. A new iron carriage was built where the gun rode in a cradle that slid on iron rails. The new carriages pivoted at the gun ports to minimize the size of the ports. Two compressors, or clamps, were fitted to squeeze the rails and increase friction between the rails and the cradle, but these were not strong enough to handle the recoil force when the gun was fired. Two more compressors were fitted as well as rope breechings to restrain the guns, but neither was entirely satisfactory. The problem was not resolved until December 1862 when strips of ash wood were placed underneath the compressors; the friction of iron on wood was double that of iron on iron and the increased friction solved the problem.

=== Armor ===
New Ironsides had a complete waterline belt of wrought iron that was 4.5 inches (114 mm) thick; below the waterline it was reduced to 3 inches (76 mm). It reached 3 feet (0.9 m) above the waterline and 4 feet (1.2 m) below. Above the belt the 170-foot (51.8 m) battery was protected by 4.5-inch armor, but the bow and stern were left unprotected. Although not initially part of the design, transverse bulkheads were added during construction to protect the ends of the battery. They consisted of 2.5 inches (64 mm) of wrought iron backed by 12 inches (305 mm) of white oak. The deck was three inches of yellow pine beneath 1 inch (25 mm) of wrought iron. Mirroring French practice, the armor plates were secured to the ship's hull and deck by countersunk screws. The armor plates were cut with a groove on each side and an iron bar was inserted between each plate to better distribute the shock of impact. The side armor was backed by 21 inches (533 mm) of wood. A conning tower with three-inch sides was also added during construction. It was placed behind the funnel and the mainmast, and had no visibility directly forward. It was small and could only fit three people.

Each of the ship's gun ports was protected by two armored shutters, each 4 inches (102 mm) thick. Each shutter rotated on an axle at its top operated from inside the battery. In combat these shutters frequently cracked or broke when hit; rarely was a shutter jammed in either the open or closed position.

== Construction and career ==
New Ironsides was named in honor of USS Constitution, which earned the nickname "Old Ironsides" during her engagement with HMS Guerrière in the War of 1812. As Constitution herself was still in commission, the name was unavailable for a new ship. Merrick & Sons was awarded a $780,000 contract for the ship on 15 October 1861 for delivery in nine months. A $500 penalty was imposed for each day past 15 July 1862 that the ship was delayed. Commodore Charles Stewart sponsored the ship as she was launched on 10 May 1862. She was commissioned on 21 August, but the navy did not invoke the penalty for late delivery. On 27 September the navy paid Merrick & Sons $34,322.06 for "extras", presumably the armored bulkheads, shutters, and conning tower not included in the original specifications.

The day after New Ironsides was commissioned, she sailed for Hampton Roads where Rear Admiral Goldsborough had been requesting her since July. He feared a Confederate sortie down the James River to attack his ships and did not believe that his armored sloop Galena and the prototype ironclad Monitor would be enough. On 31 August, Secretary Welles ordered New Ironsides back to Philadelphia for post-trial repairs. Her voyage to Hampton Roads had revealed problems with her steering, gun recoil, and lack of speed. A start was made on the gun recoil problem when she was ordered to return to Hampton Roads on 23 September, but the other two problems proved to be intractable. She was kept ready to respond to a Confederate attack with steam up while mechanics were sent to fix the recoil problems and the crew was training.

New Ironsides joined the South Atlantic Blockading Squadron at Port Royal, South Carolina, on 17 January 1863. When she first arrived, the ship exchanged her masts and rigging for poles suitable for signaling. Rear Admiral Du Pont ordered that the ship's funnel be cut down to improve the visibility from the conning tower, but the fumes from the funnel nearly asphyxiated the men in the conning tower and on the gun deck, and the funnel had to be restored. He also attempted to move the 18-long-ton (18 t) conning tower to a better position, but it was too heavy for the equipment available.

New Ironsides and monitors engaging Fort Moultrie, Charleston Harbor, September 8, 1863

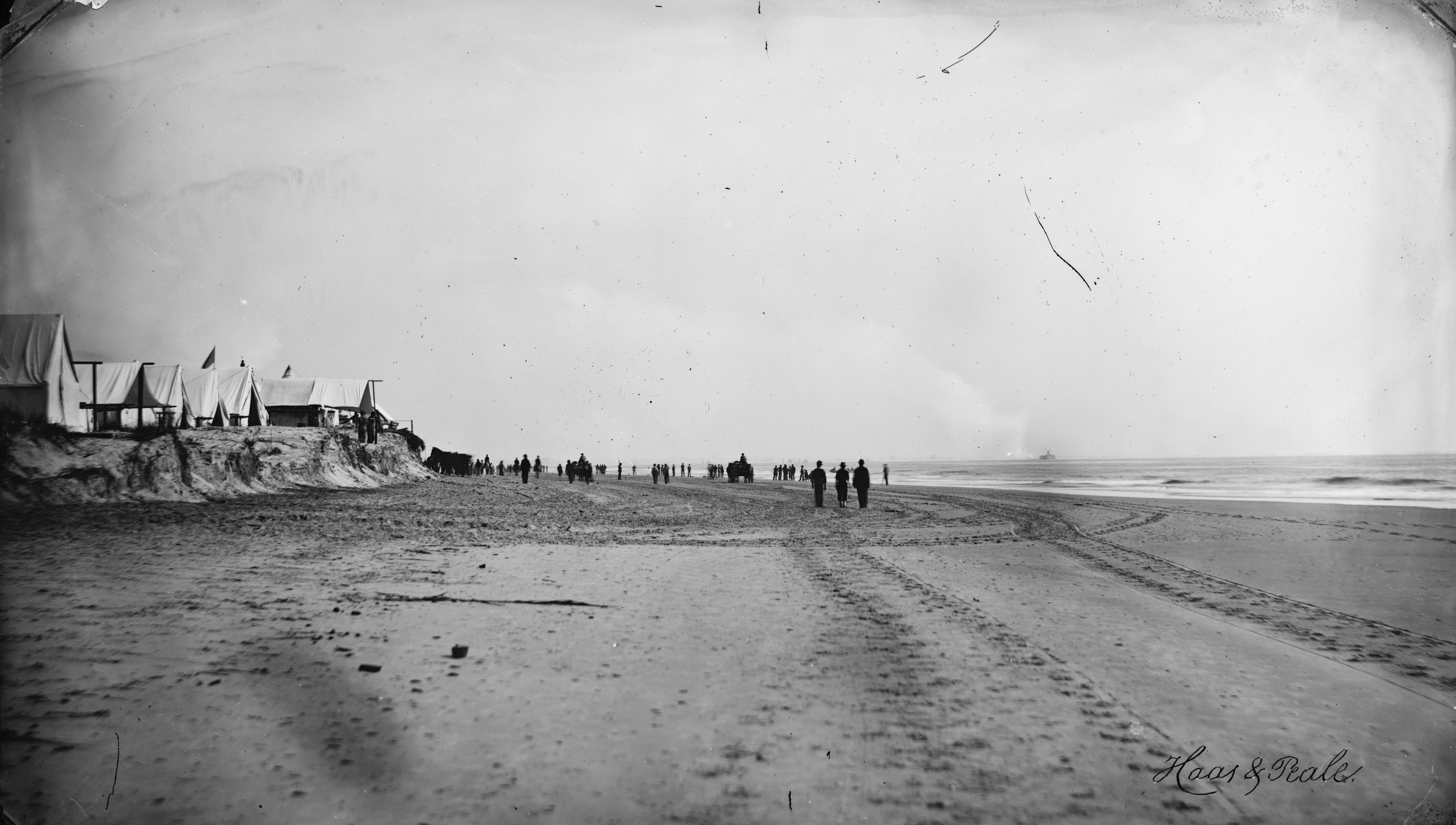
New Ironsides and five monitors engaging Forts Wagner and Gregg in Charleston Harbor, in what is one of the world's first combat action photographs, September 7, 1863

The day after the Confederate casemate ironclads CSS Chicora and CSS Palmetto State sortied and briefly captured two Union ships on 31 January, New Ironsides was ordered to patrol off Charleston Harbor. The ship remained at Charleston for the rest of the year except for brief intervals at Port Royal. She participated in the First Battle of Charleston Harbor on 7 April 1863, when nine Union ironclads entered the harbor and conducted a prolonged, but inconclusive, bombardment of Fort Sumter. New Ironsides served as the flagship of Rear Admiral Du Pont during the battle. He and his staff occupied the conning tower during the engagement, which forced the ship's captain to command the ship from the gun deck. Admiral Du Pont's pilot was unfamiliar with New Ironsides' quirks, and the channel used during the attack was shallower in places than her deep draft; she maneuvered erratically and had to anchor several times to avoid going aground. The monitors Catskill and Nantucket collided with New Ironsides as they attempted to move past her, but no damage was suffered by any of the ships. As the ship was withdrawing she anchored directly over a Confederate "torpedo" (mine) that was filled with 3,000 pounds (1,360 kg) of gunpowder that failed to detonate. During the bombardment New Ironsides fired only a single broadside, but she was hit over 50 times in return without significant damage or casualties.

New Ironsides repeatedly bombarded Confederate positions in the successful campaign to take Fort Wagner on Morris Island beginning with the Second Battle of Fort Wagner on 18 July through the next two months and the Second Battle of Charleston Harbor. During this time the ship was the target of a failed spar torpedo boat attack on 21 August. While resupplying ammunition on 8 September, New Ironsides was called to provide cover for the monitor Weehawken which had grounded between Fort Sumter and Cummings Point. New Ironsides anchored 1,200 yards (1,100 m) in front of Fort Moultrie and forced the Confederate gunners to seek cover; she fired 483 shells and was struck at least 70 times. The ship also contributed crewmen for the landing party that unsuccessfully attempted to seize Fort Sumter on the night of 8–9 September. Between July and October New Ironsides fired 4439 rounds and was hit by at least 150 heavy projectiles, none of which inflicted any significant damage or casualties.

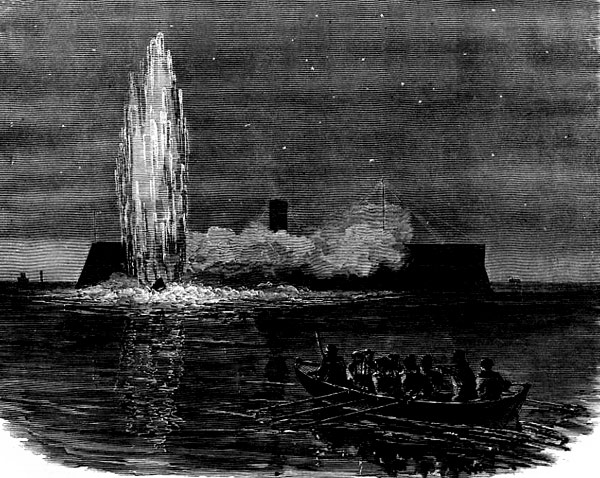
The attack on New Ironsides by CSS David

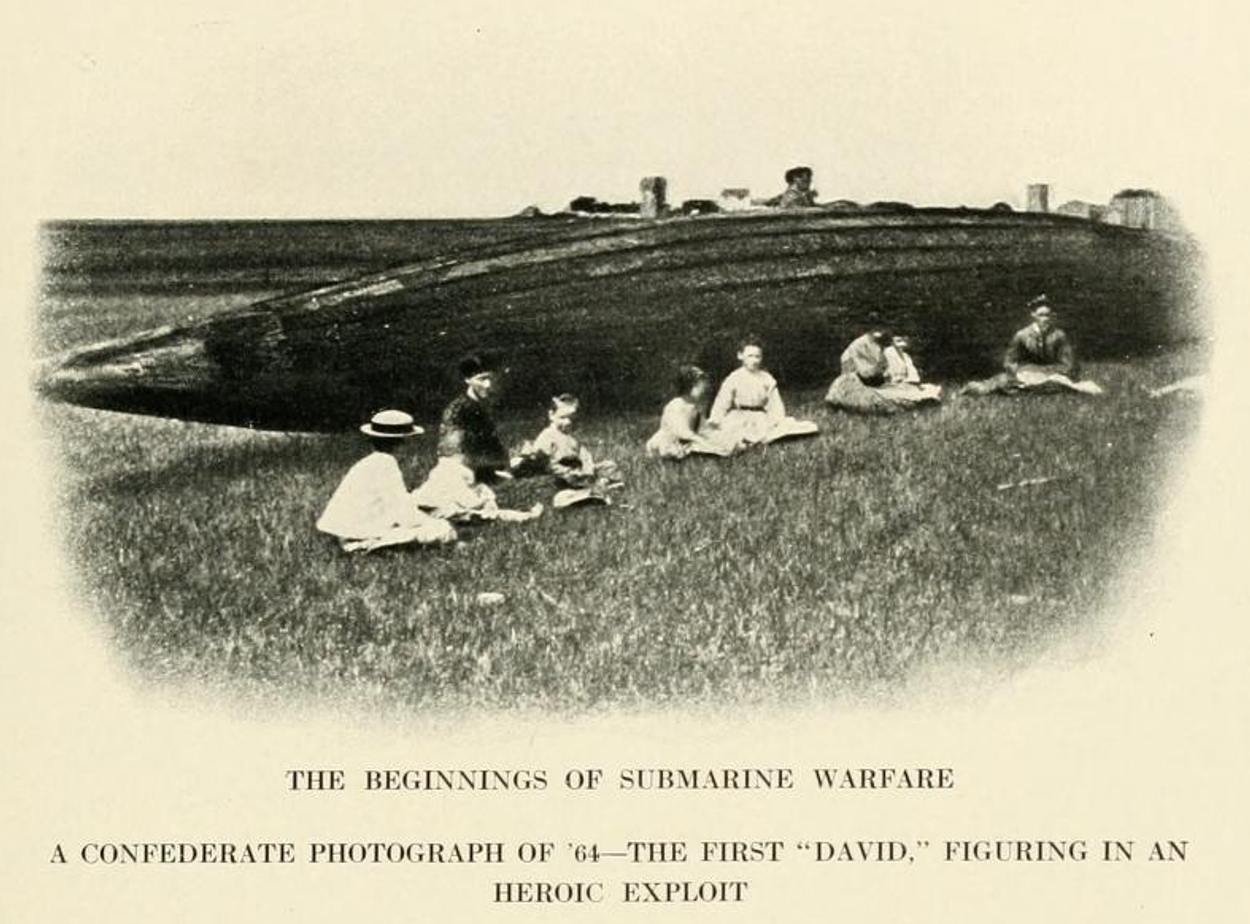
The wreck of the CSS David

Another spar torpedo attack was made by the semi-submersible CSS David on the night of 5 October 1863. The attack was successful, but the damage was minor, and only one man later died of his wounds. New Ironsides remained on station until 6 June 1864 when she returned to Port Royal preparatory to a return to Philadelphia for repairs and a general overhaul. Her masts and rigging were replaced and most of the ship's crew with time remaining on their enlistments were transferred to other ships in the squadron. The ship arrived at the Philadelphia Naval Shipyard on 24 June and was decommissioned six days later to begin her refit.

New Ironsides completed her overhaul in late August 1864, now under the command of Commodore William Radford, but did not join the North Atlantic Blockading Squadron in Hampton Roads until October when her crew finished gunnery training. She participated in a major assault in December on Fort Fisher, North Carolina, in an effort to stop blockade running into the port of Wilmington. Though this attack was called off on Christmas Day after an extensive bombardment, the Union fleet returned to resume the operation on 13 January 1865. New Ironsides was one of several warships that heavily shelled Fort Fisher, preparing the way for a ground assault that captured the position on 15 January. Afterward and for the next few months, New Ironsides supported Union activities on the James River. She was decommissioned on 6 April 1865 and was laid up at League Island, Philadelphia, where, on the night of 16 December 1865, New Ironsides was destroyed by a fire. The ship was towed to shallow water where she burned and sank. Her wreck was salvaged and her boilers were offered for sale in 1869.

== Medals of Honor ==
The following crewmen of the New Ironsides were awarded the Medal of Honor for their actions during the Second Battle of Fort Fisher:

- James Barnum, Boatswain's Mate, U.S. Navy
- John Dempster, Coxswain, U.S. Navy
- Thomas English, Signal Quartermaster, U.S. Navy
- Edmund Haffee, Quarter Gunner, U.S. Navy
- Nicholas Lear, Quartermaster, U.S. Navy
- Daniel Milliken, Quarter Gunner, U.S. Navy
- Joseph White, Coxswain, U.S. Navy
- Richard Willis, Coxswain, U.S. Navy
