= Joseph B. Hayden =

- Born: c. 1834; St. Mary's City, Maryland
- Military career
- Allegiance: United States of America; Union
- Branch: United States Navy; Union Navy
- Rank: Quartermaster
- Unit: (United States Navy) USS Ticonderoga
- Conflicts: American Civil War • Second Battle of Fort Fisher
- Awards: Medal of Honor

Joseph B. Hayden (c. 1834 – unknown) was a sailor in the U.S. Navy during the American Civil War. He received the Medal of Honor for his actions during the Second Battle of Fort Fisher on January 15, 1865.

== Military service ==
Haffee enlisted in the Navy in December 1862 and was assigned to the Union sloop-of-war USS Ticonderoga (1862). His enlistment is credited to the state of Maryland.

On January 15, 1865, the North Carolina Confederate stronghold of Fort Fisher was taken by a combined Union storming party of sailors, marines, and soldiers under the command of Admiral David Dixon Porter and General Alfred Terry.

== Medal of Honor citation ==
The President of the United States of America, in the name of Congress, takes pleasure in presenting the Medal of Honor to Quartermaster Joseph B. Hayden, United States Navy, for extraordinary heroism in action while serving on board the U.S.S. TICONDEROGA, as Quartermaster in charge of steering the ship into action, during attacks on Fort Fisher, North Carolina, 13 to 15 January 1865. Quartermaster Joe Hayden steered the ship into position in the line of battle where she maintained a well-directed fire upon the batteries to the left of the palisades during the initial phases of the engagement. Although several of the enemy's shots fell over and around the vessel, the TICONDEROGA fought her guns gallantly throughout three consecutive days of battle until the flag was planted on one of the strongest fortifications possessed by the rebels.

General Orders: War Department, General Orders No. 59 (June 22, 1865)

Action Date: January 15, 1865

Service: Navy

Rank: Signal Quartermaster

Division: U.S.S. Ticonderoga

== See also ==
- List of Medal of Honor recipients
- List of American Civil War Medal of Honor recipients: G–L
