= USS Ticonderoga (1862) =

Gunboat of the United States Navy

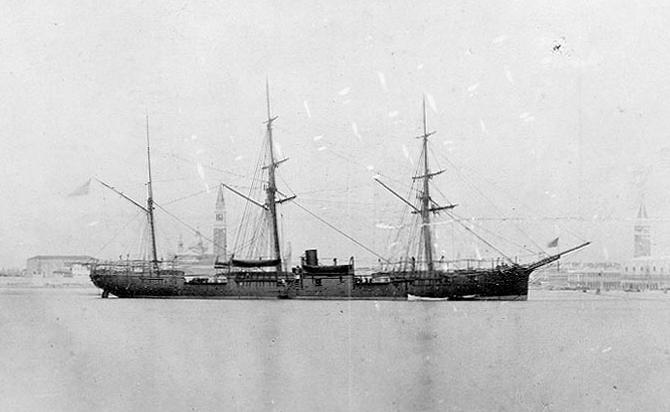
- USS Ticonderoga

History

United States
- Name: USS Ticonderoga
- Builder: New York Navy Yard
- Laid down: 1861
- Launched: 16 October 1862
- Commissioned: 12 May 1863
- Decommissioned: 5 May 1865
- Recommissioned: 1866
- Decommissioned: 24 October 1874
- Recommissioned: 5 November 1878
- Decommissioned: 10 September 1882
- Fate: Sold, 5 August 1887

General characteristics
- Type: Screw sloop-of-war
- Displacement: 2,526 long tons (2,567 t)
- Length: 237 ft (72 m)
- Beam: 38 ft 2 in (11.63 m)
- Draft: 17 ft 6 in (5.33 m)
- Speed: 11 knots (20 km/h; 13 mph)
- Armament: 1 × 150-pounder Parrott rifle; 1 × 50-pounder Dahlgren rifle; 6 × 9 in (230 mm) Dahlgren smoothbores; 2 × 24-pounder howitzers; 2 × 12-pounder rifles; 2 × heavy 12-pounder smoothbores

The second USS Ticonderoga was a 2526-ton Lackawanna-class screw sloop-of-war laid down by the New York Navy Yard in 1861; launched on 16 October 1862; sponsored by Miss Katherine Heaton Offley; and commissioned at New York on 12 May 1863, Commodore J. L. Lardner in command.

== Service history ==
=== Civil War, 1863–1865 ===
Ticonderoga went south on 5 June 1863 for duty as flagship of the West Indies Squadron and, after stopping at Philadelphia, arrived at Cape Haitien on 12 June. She patrolled waters off the Virgin Islands, Barbados, Tobago, Trinidad, and Curaçao protecting Union commerce. Ticonderoga returned to Philadelphia for repairs in September. She was relieved as flagship of the squadron in October and sent to the Boston Navy Yard.

Operating out of Boston, Ticonderoga searched unsuccessfully off Nova Scotia for the captured steamer Chesapeake from 11 to 16 December. In June 1864, she hunted Confederate commerce raiders off the New England coast, putting into Portland harbor, Maine, on 26 June. There, Ticonderoga received a telegram on 10 July ordering her to track down and destroy the marauding Confederate raider CSS Florida. Her search lasted until October and carried Ticonderoga as far south as Cabo São Roque (Cape San Roque), Brazil, but was stopped because of mechanical troubles and insufficient fuel. She returned to Philadelphia late in October.

Ticonderoga left Philadelphia bound for Hampton Roads, Virginia, on 31 October. She was assigned to the North Atlantic Blockading Squadron on 4 November and deployed off Wilmington, North Carolina. Ticonderoga participated in the first, unsuccessful attempt to take Fort Fisher, North Carolina, on 24 and 25 December, losing eight men killed and 20 wounded on the first day of the assault when a 100-pounder Parrott rifle exploded. A landing party from Ticonderoga assisted in the capture of the fort on 15 January 1865, during the Second Battle of Fort Fisher.

Ticonderoga joined the South Atlantic Blockading Squadron on 19 January. After a brief tour of duty, she left for Philadelphia in March and was decommissioned there on 5 May.

=== Medals of Honor ===
The following crewmen of the USS Ticonderoga were awarded the Medal of Honor for actions during the Civil War:

- Richard Binder, Sergeant, U.S. Marine Corps
- Edward R. Bowman, Quartermaster, U.S. Navy
- William Campbell, Boatswain's Mate, U.S. Navy
- Isaac N. Fry, Orderly Sergeant, U.S. Marine Corps
- Joseph B. Hayden, Quartermaster, U.S. Navy
- Thomas Jones, Coxswain, U.S. Navy
- George Prance, Captain of the Main Top, U.S. Navy
- William Shipman, Coxswain, U.S. Navy
- Robert Sommers, Chief Quartermaster, U.S. Navy
- William G. Taylor, Captain of the Forecastle, U.S. Navy

=== 1866–1874 ===
Ticonderoga was recommissioned for service with the European Squadron in 1866. She remained with the Squadron through 1869, visiting ports in the Mediterranean, on the Continent, and along the English and African coasts. The vessel was extensively repaired in 1870 and reported for duty with the South Atlantic Squadron at Rio de Janeiro on 23 August 1871. After over two years of service on the coast of South America, she was reassigned to the North Atlantic Squadron in January 1874. The ship was decommissioned at Portsmouth Naval Shipyard in Kittery, Maine, on 24 October and remained laid up there until 1877.

=== 1878–1882 ===
Ticonderoga was recommissioned on 5 November 1878 and ordered to embark upon a cruise around the world, Commodore Robert Wilson Shufeldt commanding. The expedition was of a commercial nature, intended to expand existing trade relations and establish new ones. Ticonderoga sailed eastward from Hampton Roads on 7 December and stopped at ports including Madeira, Monrovia, Cape Town, Aden, Bombay, Penang, Singapore, Manila, Hong Kong, Nagasaki, Fusan, Honolulu, and San Francisco. Ticonderoga arrived at Mare Island, California, for extensive repairs on 9 November 1880. During the two-year mission, she had visited over 40 ports and steamed in excess of 36,000 miles without a mishap.

She left Mare Island in March 1881 and returned to New York on 23 August. She was decommissioned there a final time on 10 September 1882 and declared unfit for further service. Ticonderoga was sold at Boston on 5 August 1887 to Thomas Butler & Company.

=== 2012 ===
Ticonderoga's bell is currently on display at the Dossin Great Lakes Museum on Belle Isle, Detroit, Michigan.

== Relevant articles ==
- Confederate States Navy
- Union Navy
- Union Blockade
- List of sloops of war of the United States Navy
- Bibliography of early American naval history
- Robert Wilson Shufeldt (naval officer)
