= John Shivers =

John Shivers may refer to:

- John Shivers (Medal of Honor) (1830–?), U.S. Marine and Medal of Honor recipient
- John Shivers (sound designer), American theatrical sound designer
- John D. Shivers Jr., member of the Ohio House of Representatives
