= Charles Mills (Medal of Honor) =

American Civil War Medal of Honor recipient (born 1840)

- Civil War era Navy Medal of Honor
- Born: September 1, 1840; Ulster, New York
- Died: January 16, 1887; Brooklyn, New York City
- Burial place: Cemetery of the Evergreens
- Military career
- Allegiance: United States of America; Union
- Branch: United States Navy; Union Navy
- Rank: Seaman
- Unit: USS Minnesota
- Conflicts: American Civil War • Second Battle of Fort Fisher
- Awards: Medal of Honor

Charles Mills (September 1, 1840 – unknown) was a U.S. sailor stationed aboard the USS Minnesota during the American Civil War. He received the Medal of Honor for his actions during the Second Battle of Fort Fisher on January 15, 1865.

== Military service ==
Mills volunteered for service in the U.S. Navy and was assigned to the Union steam frigate USS Minnesota. His enlistment is credited to the state of New York.

On January 15, 1865 the North Carolina Confederate stronghold of Fort Fisher was taken by a combined Union storming party of sailors, marines, and soldiers under the command of Admiral David Dixon Porter and General Alfred Terry. Mills was one of nine crewmen from the USS Minnesota who received the Medal of Honor for gallantry in this action. The wounded officer that Mills risked his life for was Acting Ensign Frederick A. O'Connor of the USS Minnesota.

== Medal of Honor citation ==
For The President of the United States of America, in the name of Congress, takes pleasure in presenting the Medal of Honor to Seaman Charles Mills, United States Navy, for extraordinary heroism in action while serving on board the U.S.S. Minnesota, in action during the assault on Fort Fisher, North Carolina, 15 January 1865. Landing on the beach with the assaulting party from his ship, Seaman Mills charged up to the palisades and, when more than two thirds of the men became seized with panic and retreated on the run, risked his life to remain with a wounded officer. With the enemy concentrating his fire on the group, he waited until after dark before assisting the wounded man from the field.

General Orders: War Department, General Orders No. 59 (June 22, 1865)

Action Date: January 15, 1865

Service: Navy

Rank: Seaman

Division: U.S.S. Minnesota

== See also ==
- List of Medal of Honor recipients
- List of American Civil War Medal of Honor recipients: M–P
