= John Rannahan =

United States Marine Corps Medal of Honor recipient

- Born: c. 1836; County Monaghan, Ireland
- Died: 1 June 1892; Millwood, Pennsylvania
- Military career
- Allegiance: United States of America; Union
- Branch: United States Marine Corps
- Service years: 1861 - 1865
- Rank: Corporal
- Unit: (United States Marine Corps) USS Minnesota
- Conflicts: American Civil War • Second Battle of Fort Fisher
- Awards: Medal of Honor

John Rannahan (c. 1836 – 1 June 1892) was a corporal in the U.S. Marine Corps stationed aboard the USS Minnesota during the American Civil War. He received the Medal of Honor for his actions during the Second Battle of Fort Fisher on January 15, 1865.

== Military service ==
Rannahan enlisted in the Marine Corps from Philadelphia in June 1861 and was assigned to the Union frigate USS Minnesota. On January 15, 1865, the North Carolina Confederate stronghold of Fort Fisher was taken by a combined Union storming party of sailors, marines, and soldiers under the command of Admiral David Dixon Porter and General Alfred Terry. Rannahan was one of nine crewmen from the USS Minnesota who received the Medal of Honor for their actions in this battle. He was discharged later that same month.

== Medal of Honor citation ==
The President of the United States of America, in the name of Congress, takes pleasure in presenting the Medal of Honor to Corporal John Rannahan, United States Marine Corps, for extraordinary heroism in action on board the U.S.S. Minnesota in the assault on Fort Fisher, 15 January 1865. Landing on the beach with the assaulting party from his ship, Corporal Rannahan advanced to the top of the sandhill and partly through the breach in the palisades despite enemy fire which killed or wounded many officers and men. When more than two-thirds of the men became seized with panic and retreated on the run, he remained with the party until dark when it came safely away, bringing its wounded, its arms and its colors.

General Orders: War Department, General Orders No. 59 (June 22, 1865).

Action Date: January 15, 1865.

Service: Marine Corps.

Rank: Corporal.

Division: U.S.S. Minnesota.

== See also ==
- List of Medal of Honor recipients.
- List of American Civil War Medal of Honor recipients: Q–S.
