= Thomas Connor =

American sailor (1842–??)

- Born: 1842; Ireland
- Died: Unknown
- Military career
- Allegiance: United States of America; Union
- Branch: United States Navy; Union Navy
- Rank: Ordinary Seaman
- Unit: USS Minnesota
- Conflicts: American Civil War • Second Battle of Fort Fisher
- Awards: Medal of Honor

Thomas Connor (1842 – Unknown) was a U.S. sailor stationed aboard the USS Minnesota during the American Civil War. He received the Medal of Honor for his actions during the Second Battle of Fort Fisher on January 15, 1865.

== Military service ==
Emigrating from his native Ireland, Connor volunteered for service in the U.S. Navy and was assigned to the Union steam frigate USS Minnesota. His enlistment is credited to the state of Maryland.

On January 15, 1865 the North Carolina Confederate stronghold of Fort Fisher was taken by a combined Union landing party of sailors, U.S. Marines, and soldiers under the command of Admiral David Dixon Porter and General Alfred Terry. Connor was one of nine crewmen from the USS Minnesota who received the Medal of Honor for their actions during the battle.

== Medal of Honor citation ==
"The President of the United States of America, in the name of Congress, takes pleasure in presenting the Medal of Honor to Ordinary Seaman Thomas Connor, United States Navy, for extraordinary heroism in action while serving on board the U.S.S. Minnesota, in action during the assault on Fort Fisher, North Carolina, 15 January 1865. Landing on the beach with the assaulting party from his ship, Ordinary Seaman Connor charged up to the palisades and, when more than two-thirds of the men became seized with panic and retreated on the run, risked his life to remain with a wounded officer. With the enemy concentrating his fire on the group, he waited until after dark before assisting in carrying the wounded man from the field."

General Orders: War Department, General Orders No. 59 (June 22, 1865)

Action Date: January 15, 1865

Service: Navy

Rank: Ordinary Seaman

Division: U.S.S. Minnesota

== See also ==
- List of Medal of Honor recipients
- List of American Civil War Medal of Honor recipients: A–F
