= Gurdon H. Barter =

- Born: c. 1843; Williamsburg, New York, US
- Died: April 22, 1900 (aged 56–57); Viola, Idaho, US
- Military career
- Allegiance: United States; Union
- Branch: United States Navy
- Rank: Landsman
- Unit: USS Minnesota
- Conflicts: American Civil War • Second Battle of Fort Fisher
- Awards: Medal of Honor

Gurdon H. Barter (c. 1843 – April 22, 1900) was a U.S. sailor stationed aboard the USS Minnesota during the American Civil War. He received the Medal of Honor for his actions during the Second Battle of Fort Fisher on January 15, 1865.

== Military service ==
Barter volunteered for service in the U.S. Navy and was assigned to the Union steam frigate USS Minnesota. His enlistment is credited to the state of New York.

On January 15, 1865 the North Carolina Confederate stronghold of Fort Fisher was taken by a combined Union storming party of sailors, marines, and soldiers under the command of Admiral David Dixon Porter and General Alfred Terry. Barter was one of nine crewmen from the USS Minnesota who received the Medal of Honor for their actions during the battle.

== Medal of Honor citation ==
Citation:

The President of the United States of America, in the name of Congress, takes pleasure in presenting the Medal of Honor to Landsman Gurdon H. Barter, United States Navy, for extraordinary heroism in action while serving on board the U.S.S. Minnesota in action during the assault on Fort Fisher, North Carolina, 15 January 1865. Landing on the beach with the assaulting party from his ship, Landsman Barter advanced to the top of the sand hill and partly through the breach in the palisades despite enemy fire which killed and wounded many officers and men. When more than two-thirds of the men became seized with panic and retreated on the run, he remained with the party until dark, when it came safely away, bringing its wounded, its arms, and its colors."

General Orders: War Department, General Orders No. 59 (June 22, 1865)

Action Date: January 15, 1865

Service: Navy

Rank: Landsman

Division: U.S.S. Minnesota

== See also ==
- List of American Civil War Medal of Honor recipients: A–F
- List of Medal of Honor recipients for the Second Battle of Fort Fisher
