= USS Minnesota (1855) =

Gunboat of the United States Navy

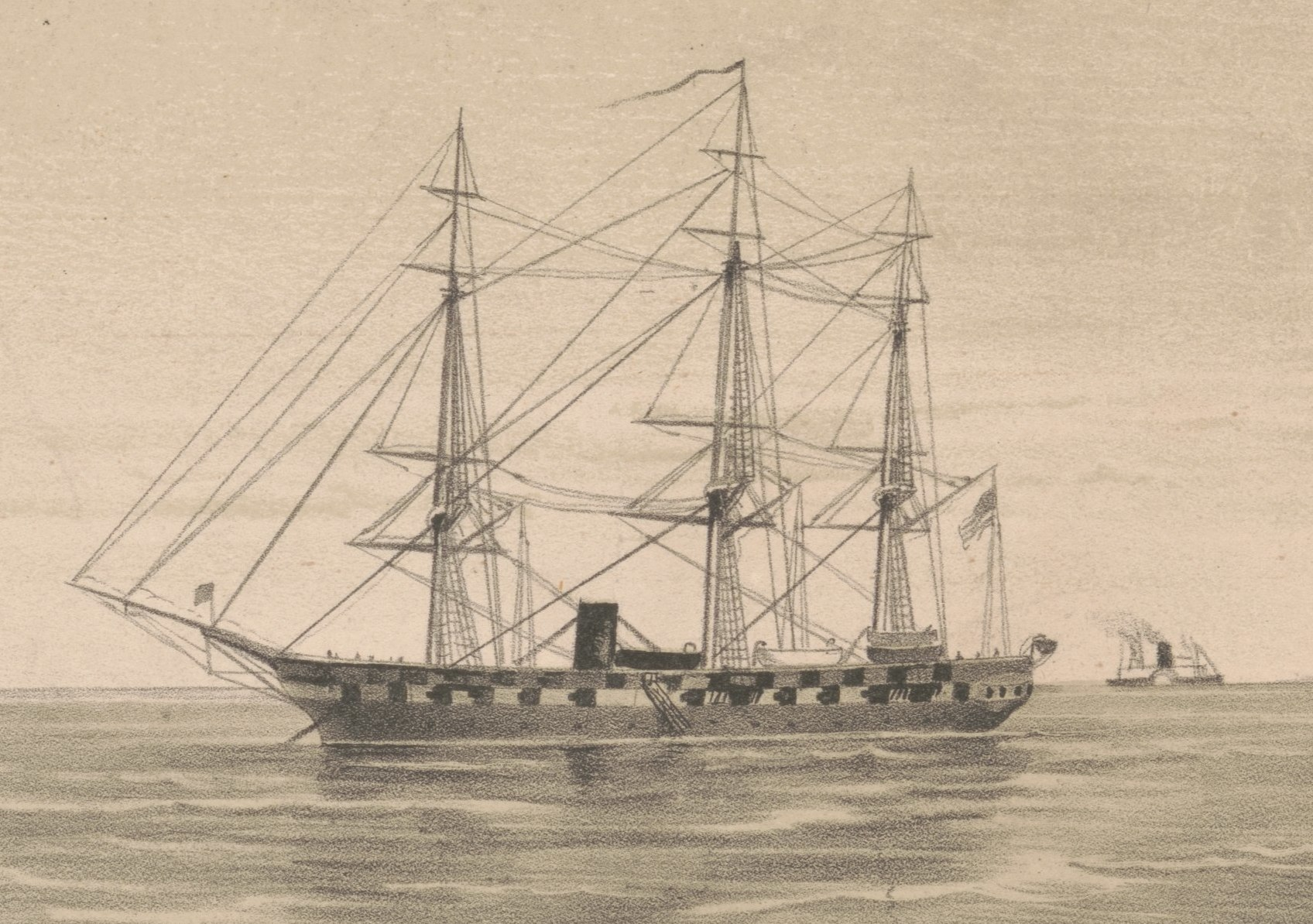
- Minnesota at Hampton-Roads in 1862

History

United States
- Name: USS Minnesota
- Namesake: The Minnesota River
- Builder: Washington Navy Yard, Washington, D.C.
- Laid down: May 1854
- Launched: 1 December 1855
- Sponsored by: Susan L. Mann
- Commissioned: 21 May 1857
- Decommissioned: 2 June 1859
- Recommissioned: 2 May 1861
- Decommissioned: 16 February 1865
- Recommissioned: 3 June 1867
- Out of service: Placed in ordinary 13 January 1868
- Recommissioned: 12 June 1875
- Out of service: Loaned to Massachusetts Naval Militia October 1895 – August 1901
- Fate: Sold August 1901; later burned

General characteristics
- Type: Screw frigate
- Displacement: 3,307 long tons (3,360 t)
- Length: 264 ft 9 in (80.70 m)
- Beam: 51 ft 4 in (15.65 m)
- Draft: 23 ft 10 in (7.26 m)
- Propulsion: Steam engine
- Sail plan: Ship Rig
- Speed: 12.5 knots
- Complement: 646 officers and enlisted
- Armament: 2 × 10 in (250 mm) guns; 28 × 9 in (230 mm) guns; 14 × 8 in (200 mm) guns

USS Minnesota was a wooden steam frigate in the United States Navy. Launched in 1855 and commissioned eighteen months later, the ship served in east Asia for two years before being decommissioned. She was recommissioned at the outbreak of the American Civil War and returned to service as the flagship of the North Atlantic Blockading Squadron.

During the first day of the Battle of Hampton Roads on 8 March 1862, Minnesota ran aground, and the following battle badly damaged her and inflicted many casualties. On the second day of the battle, USS Monitor engaged CSS Virginia, allowing tugs to free Minnesota on the morning of 10 March. Minnesota was repaired and returned to duty, and three years later she participated in the Second Battle of Fort Fisher. Minnesota served until 1898, when she was stricken, beached and burnt to recover her metal fittings and to clear her name for a newly ordered battleship, USS Minnesota (BB-22).

== Construction and early duties ==
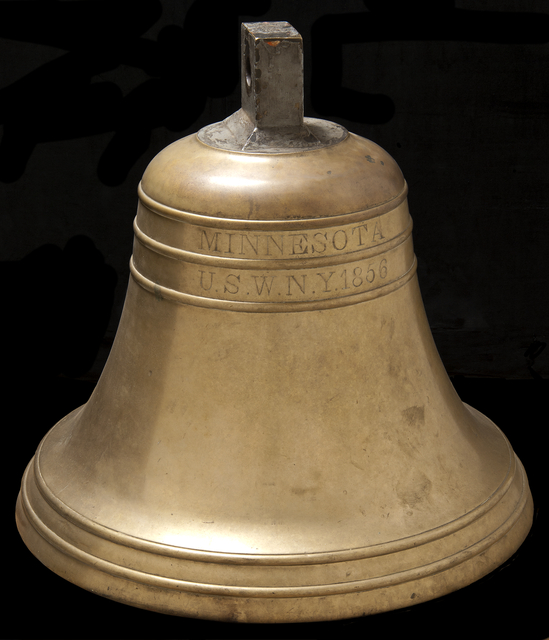
A cast brass bell from the U.S.S. Minnesota is engraved "MINNESOTA / U.S.W.N.Y. 1856" Image from the collection of the Minnesota Historical Society

Minnesota was laid down in May 1854 by the Washington Navy Yard on the East Branch of the Potomac River (Anacostia River) in southeast Washington, D.C. She was named and launched on 1 December 1855, sponsored by Susan L. Mann, and commissioned into the lists of the United States Navy on 21 May 1857 with Captain Samuel Francis DuPont in command.

Minnesota was named for the Minnesota River, tributary to the upper Mississippi River. Her sister ships were also named for American rivers: the Wabash (first in class), Colorado, Merrimack (salvaged 1861–62 and renamed C.S.S. Virginia by the Confederate States Navy), and the Roanoke (later converted to a monitor-type ironclad warship).

Minnesota, carrying William B. Reed, appointed U.S. Minister to the Empire of China, departed from Norfolk, Virginia, on 1 July 1857 for the continent of East Asia. During her service with the East India Squadron, she visited many of the principal ports of China and Japan before departing Hong Kong to bring Minister Reed home with a newly negotiated commerce treaty, the Treaty of Tianjin, with the Manchu dynasty of the Chinese Empire. Upon arrival in Boston, Massachusetts, on 2 June 1859, Minnesota was decommissioned at the Boston Navy Yard on the Charles River in Charlestown, Massachusetts, (across from Boston) the same day and remained in ordinary (holding status) there until the outbreak of the American Civil War two years later in April 1861.

== American Civil War ==
Minnesota was recommissioned on 2 May 1861, Captain G. J. Van Brunt in command, and became flagship of the Atlantic Blockading Squadron, commanded by Flag Officer Silas Stringham. She arrived at Hampton Roads, Virginia, on 13 May and the next day captured the schooners Mary Willis, Delaware Farmer, and Emily Ann. Minnesota took the bark Winfred on the 25th and the bark Sally McGee on 26 June. Schooner Sally Mears became her prize 1 July and bark Mary Warick struck her colors to the steam frigate on the 10th.

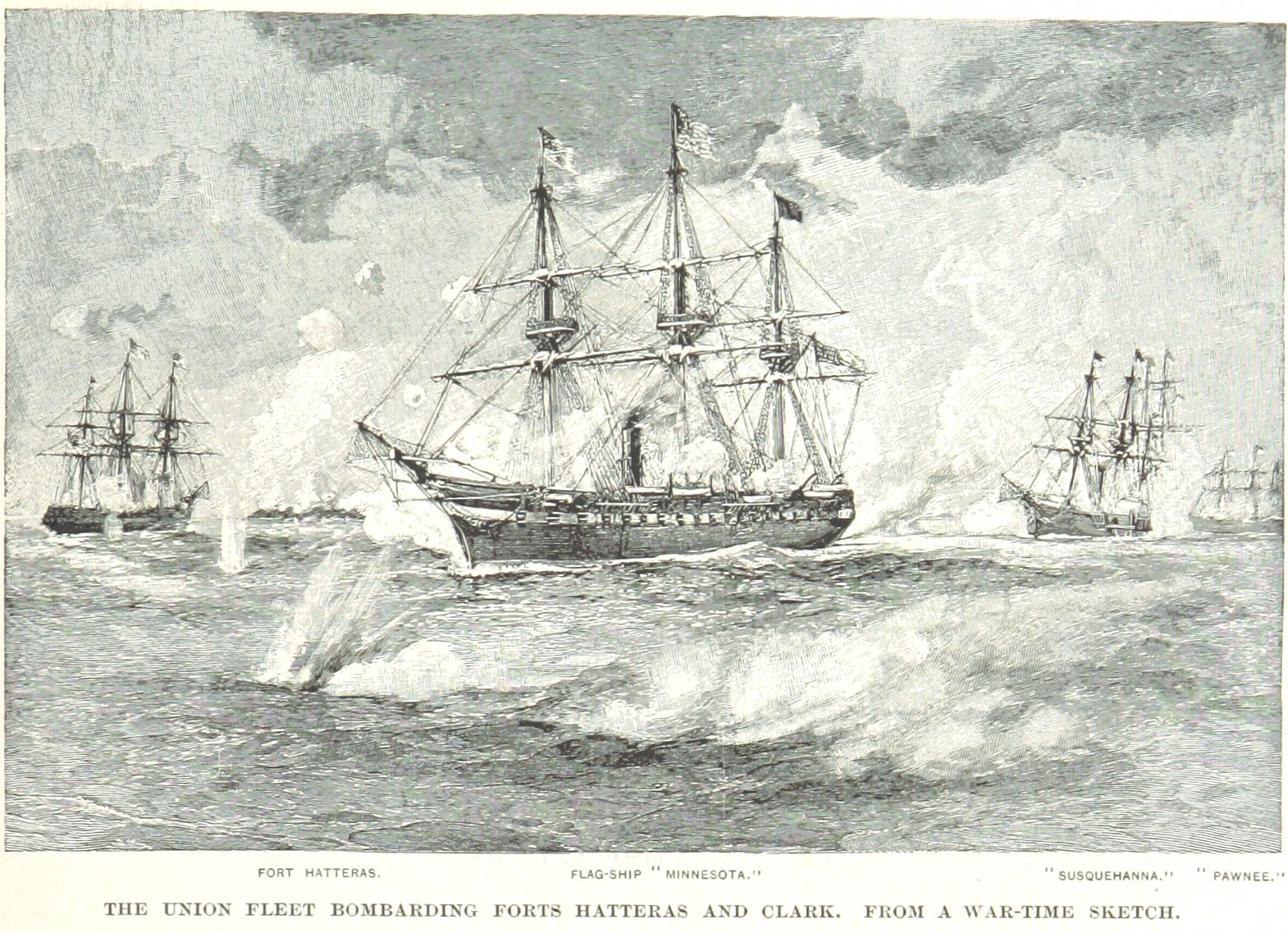
Minnesota (center) and other Union warships bombard Confederate forts at Hatteras Inlet

Minnesota led a joint Army-Navy expedition, known as the Battle of Hatteras Inlet Batteries, against two important Confederate forts which had been erected at Hatteras Inlet, North Carolina. The squadron opened fire on Fort Clark on the morning of 28 August 1861, forcing the Confederate gunners to abandon the fort at noon. The following day, the fire of the squadron was concentrated on Fort Hatteras. The bombardment was so effective the Confederates were compelled to seek cover in bomb shelters and surrendered.

When Flag Officer Louis M. Goldsborough relieved Stringham in command of the North Atlantic Blockading Squadron on 23 September, he selected Minnesota as his flagship. William B. Cushing, later to distinguish himself for sinking the Confederate ironclad CSS Albemarle, was assigned as a junior officer to the Minnesota.

=== Battle of Hampton Roads ===
While blockading off Hampton Roads, 8 March 1862, Minnesota sighted three Confederate warships, Jamestown, Patrick Henry, and led by the unique revolutionary appearance of the CSS Virginia—the former USS Merrimack, (the 1855 steam-powered heavy frigate, rebuilt since burnt/scuttled in 1861 and now protected by riveted iron plates) — rounding Sewell's Point from Norfolk and the Elizabeth River, and heading north across the Hampton Roads harbor to the northern peninsula toward Newport News, Virginia. Minnesota slipped her cables and got underway to engage the Southern warships in a fight that would come to be known as the Battle of Hampton Roads. When about 1.5 miles off-shore from Newport News, the Minnesota grounded.

Meanwhile, CSS Virginia passed the federal frigate Congress and rammed and sank sailing frigate Cumberland. Virginia then engaged Congress compelling her to surrender and setting her afire. Then the rebel iron warship Virginia, along with Jamestown, and Patrick Henry bombarded the stranded Minnesota killing and wounding several of her crew before the Union Navy warship's heavy guns drove them off. Minnesota also fired upon Virginia with her pivot gun. Toward twilight the Southern ironclad withdrew southward back across the harbor toward Norfolk and the Elizabeth River.

The recoil from her broadside guns forced Minnesota further upon the mud bank. All night, steam tug boats worked to pull and haul her off the bottom, but to no avail. However, during the night USS Monitor arrived from its southward trip down the East Coast from New York City. "All on board felt we had a friend that would stand by us in our hour of trial," wrote Captain Gershom Jacques Van Brunt (1798–1863), the stranded and damaged Minnesota vessel's commander, in his official report to the Navy Department, the day after the engagement in Hampton Roads. Early the next morning, the CSS Virginia reappeared. As the range closed, the now guarding little Monitor, steaming between Minnesota and the iron-clad Southern attacker, fired gun after gun from her revolving turret, and the Virginia returned fire with whole broadsides from her numerous cannon on both of her sides, but neither with much apparent effect on the other. Virginia, finding she could not hurt Monitor, then turned her attention to the grounded Minnesota, who answered with all remaining guns. Virginia fired from her rifled bow gun a shell which passed through the wooden Union warship's chief engineer's stateroom, through the engineers' mess room, amidships, and burst in the boatswain's room, exploding two charges of powder there, starting a fire on board the vulnerable wooden frigate which was promptly extinguished.

At midday Virginia withdrew southwards back toward Norfolk, and the Union Navy tugs resumed its efforts to refloat Minnesota. Early the next morning, the 1859 side-paddlewheel steamship S. R. Spaulding (on duty as a hospital ship with the Hospital Transport Service of the United States Sanitary Commission) joined the several tugs and managed to pull free and refloat the heavy frigate, and she sailed east and anchored under the protecting guns opposite Fortress Monroe (still Union-occupied) at Old Point Comfort for temporary repairs.

Seven African-American sailors of the Union Navy manned the forward gun of the federal vessel. This black crew mustered in earlier at Boston, Massachusetts, and included William Brown, Charles Johnson, George Moore, George H. Roberts, George Sales, William H. White and Henry Williams.

During the two-day engagement, the Minnesota shot off 78 rounds of 10-inch solid shot; 67 rounds of 10-inch solid shot with 15-second fuse; 169 rounds of 9-inch solid shot; 180 9-inch shells with 15-second fuse; 35 8-inch shells with 15-second fuse and expended 5,567.5 pounds of service gunpowder.

=== Battles of Fort Fisher (Wilmington, North Carolina) ===
For the next few years she served as flagship of the North Atlantic Blockading Squadron for the Union Navy / United States Navy. During the Battle of Suffolk at Norfleet House on 14 April 1863, four of the Minnesota's sailors, Coxswains Robert Jordan and Robert B. Wood and Seamen Henry Thielberg and Samuel Woods, earned the famous congressional Medal of Honor while temporarily assigned to the accompanying USS Mount Washington. While anchored off Newport News on 9 April 1864, the Minnesota was attacked by the Confederate States naval torpedo boat Squib, which exploded a torpedo charge alongside the federal warship, fortunately without causing substantial damage and escaped.

On 24 and 25 December 1864, Minnesota took part in the joint Union Navy and Army amphibious operations at the Confederate bastion of Fort Fisher which guarded Wilmington, North Carolina (the First Battle of Fort Fisher) upstream on the Cape Fear River, the last major open seaport of the South to the outside world. During the landings she took a position about a mile downstream from the fort and laid down a devastating artillery barrage on the Confederate stronghold. However, Union General Benjamin F. Butler (1818–1893), withdrew his troops, nullifying the previous gains won by the joint Army-Navy effort.

Three weeks later in January 13–15, 1865, the Union Navy returned with more Federal Army troops, now commanded by the much more vigorous and aggressive General Alfred Terry (1827–1890), to Fort Fisher for a second effort (the Second Battle of Fort Fisher). A landing force of 240 men from Minnesota, covered by a cannonade barrage from their own ship, participated in the successful assault. This operation finally after four years of effort closed outside access to the city and port of Wilmington, denying the collapsing southern Confederacy the use of this very last open invaluable major seaport, just three months before the end of the war in the East.

During the Second Battle of Fort Fisher of January 1865, nine sailors and Marines from the Minnesota earned the congressional Medal of Honor as part of the landing party which assaulted the fort. The nine men were:

- Landsman Gurdon H. Barter
- Seaman David L. Bass
- Ordinary Seaman Thomas Connor
- Ordinary Seaman Thomas Harcourt
- Seaman Charles Mills
- Corporal John Rannahan
- Private John Shivers
- Private Henry A. Thompson
- Ordinary Seaman Franklin L. Wilcox

=== Prizes ===
Date	Prize Name	Gross Proceeds	Costs and Expenses	Amount for Distribution	Where Adjudicated	Sent to 4th Auditor for Distribution	Vessels Entitled to Share
14 May 1861	Mary Willis						Released
14 May 1861	North Carolina						
15 May 1861	J.H. Etheridge						Released
15 May 1861	William Henry						Released
15 May 1861	William & John						Released
15 May 1861	Mary						Released
15 May 1861	Industry						
15 May 1861	Belle Conway						Released
17 May 1861	Star						
17 May 1861	Crenshaw						
17 May 1861	Almira Ann						
20 May 1861	Hiawatha						
20 May 1861	Tropic Wind						
22 May 1861	Arcola						
25 May 1861	Pioneer						
27 May 1861	Iris						
27 May 1861	Catherine						
26 Jun 1861	Sally Magee						
1 Jul 1861	Sally Mears						
10 Jul 1861	Amy Warwick						
11 Jan 1864	Vesta						destroyed
11 Jan 1864	Ranger						destroyed

== Later service ==
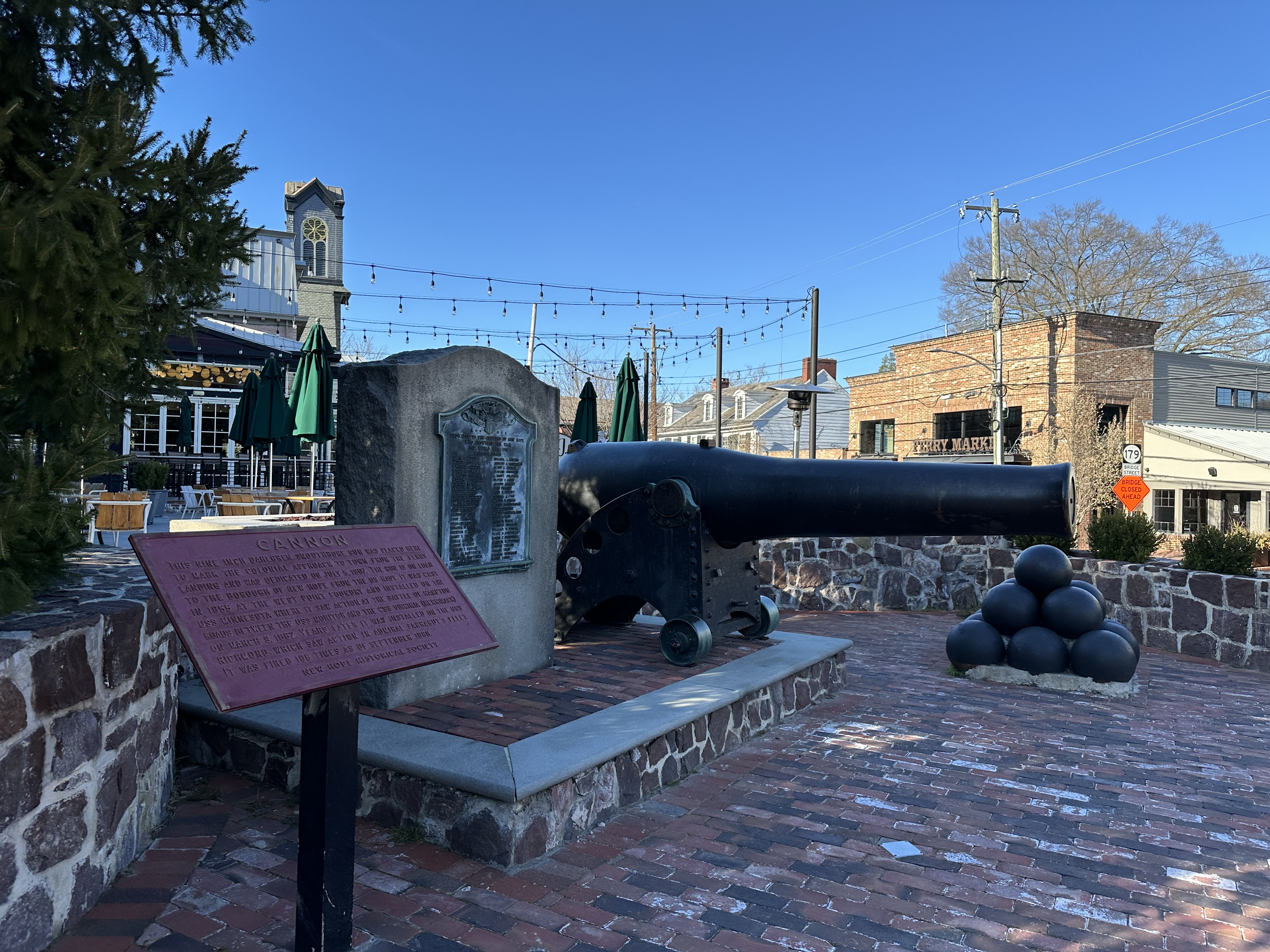
A 9-inch gun from the famous wooden heavy frigate U.S.S. Minnesota (1855–1901) of the American Civil War and late 19th century era on display in New Hope, Pennsylvania

Ordered back north to the Portsmouth Naval Shipyard at Kittery, Maine / Portsmouth, New Hampshire, Minnesota was then decommissioned and stricken from the lists of the U.S. Navy on 16 February 1865. She was recommissioned however two years later on 3 June 1867 and made a cruise with midshipmen across the Atlantic Ocean to Europe. She was subsequently placed in ordinary (holding status) at the New York Navy Yard on 13 January 1868. Recommissioned again after eight years on 12 June 1875, she remained at the New York Navy Yard as a gunnery and training ship for naval seamen apprentices. In March 1878, Minnesota sailed down the East River beneath the then under construction Brooklyn Bridge. As it passed under one of the hanging cables, the topmast was clipped and came crashing down. No damage was reported on the bridge.

In 1881 she was transferred to Newport, Rhode Island where she served as the flagship of the U.S. Navy Training Squadron. From 1881 to 1884 she was commanded by Captain Stephen Luce (1827–1917), who founded the Naval War College there at the end of his command tenure in 1884. The warship took part in dedication ceremonies for the famous Brooklyn Bridge across the East River (between the boroughs of Manhattan and Brooklyn) in New York City on 24 May 1883.

Three sailors assigned to Minnesota were awarded the Medal of Honor during this period: Captain of the Top William Lowell Hill and Ship's Cook Adam Weissel for rescuing fellow sailors from drowning in separate 1881 incidents, and Second Class Boy John Lucy for his actions during a fire at the Castle Garden immigration facility in 1876.

In October 1895, Minnesota was loaned to the Massachusetts Naval Militia, continuing that duty for six years until August 1901 when she was sold by the government to the Thomas Butler & Company of Boston. She eventually was stripped and burned to salvage her iron fittings at nearby Eastport, Maine.

== See also ==
- List of steam frigates of the United States Navy
- List of naval ships named for Minnesota
- Bibliography of early American naval history
- Union Navy
