= Thomas Harcourt =

Thomas Harcourt may refer to:

- Thomas Harcourt (Medal of Honor) (1841–?), American sailor stationed aboard the USS Minnesota during the American Civil War
- Thomas Whitbread (1618–1679) alias Harcourt, English Jesuit missionary, wrongly convicted of conspiracy to murder Charles II of England
- Thomas Harcourt (MP) for Stafford (UK Parliament constituency)
