= Henry A. Thompson =

U.S. Marine Corps Medal of Honor recipient

- Born: Roderick P. Connelly; 1841; England
- Died: February 16, 1889 (aged 47–48); Queens, New York
- Burial place: Calvary Cemetery, Woodside, New York
- Military career
- Allegiance: United States of America; Union
- Branch: United States Marine Corps
- Service years: 1863 - 1867
- Rank: Private
- Unit: USS Minnesota
- Conflicts: American Civil War • Second Battle of Fort Fisher
- Awards: Medal of Honor

Henry A. Thompson (1841 – February 16, 1889) was a U.S. Marine stationed aboard the USS Minnesota during the American Civil War. He received the Medal of Honor for his actions during the Second Battle of Fort Fisher on January 15, 1865.

== Military service ==
Emigrating from his native England, Thompson volunteered for service in the U.S. Marine Corps in 1863 and was assigned to the Union frigate USS Minnesota. His enlistment is credited to the state of Pennsylvania. Like many sailors of his day, Thompson used a pseudonym. His real name was Roderick P. Connelly.

On January 15, 1865, the North Carolina Confederate stronghold of Fort Fisher was taken by a combined Union storming party of sailors, marines, and soldiers under the command of Admiral David Dixon Porter and General Alfred Terry. Thompson was one of nine crewmen from the USS Minnesota who received the Medal of Honor for their actions during the battle.

Thompson is buried in an unmarked grave in Calvary Cemetery in Woodside, New York.

== Medal of Honor citation ==
The President of the United States of America, in the name of Congress, takes pleasure in presenting the Medal of Honor to Private Henry A. Thompson, United States Marine Corps, for extraordinary heroism in action on board the U.S.S. Minnesota in the assault on Fort Fisher, 15 January 1865. Landing on the beach with the assaulting party from his ship, Private Thompson advanced to the top of the sand hill and partly through the breach in the palisades despite enemy fire which killed or wounded many officers and men. When more than two-thirds of the men became seized with panic and retreated on the run, he remained with the party until dark when it came safely away, bringing its wounded, its arms and its colors.

== See also ==
- List of Medal of Honor recipients
- List of American Civil War Medal of Honor recipients: T–Z
