= John Shivers (Medal of Honor) =

U.S. Marine during the American Civil War

- Born: c. 1830; Canada
- Military career
- Allegiance: United States; Union
- Branch: United States Marine Corps
- Service years: 1863 - 1865
- Rank: Private
- Unit: USS Minnesota
- Conflicts: American Civil War • Second Battle of Fort Fisher
- Awards: Medal of Honor

John Shivers (c. 1830 – unknown) was a U.S. Marine stationed aboard the USS Minnesota during the American Civil War. He received the Medal of Honor for his actions during the Second Battle of Fort Fisher on January 15, 1865.

== Military service ==
Emigrating from his native Canada, Shivers joined the US Marine Corps in September 1863, and was assigned to the Union frigate USS Minnesota.

On January 15, 1865, the North Carolina Confederate stronghold of Fort Fisher was taken by a combined Union storming party of sailors, marines, and soldiers under the command of Admiral David Dixon Porter and General Alfred Terry. Shivers was one of nine crewmen from the USS Minnesota who received the Medal of Honor for their actions during this battle.

Shivers deserted in October 1865, and his later life is unknown.

== Medal of Honor citation ==
The President of the United States of America, in the name of Congress, takes pleasure in presenting the Medal of Honor to Private John Shivers, United States Marine Corps, for extraordinary heroism in action on board the U.S.S. Minnesota in the assault on Fort Fisher, 15 January 1865. Landing on the beach with the assaulting party from his ship, Private Shivers advanced to the top of the sand hill and partly through the breach in the palisades despite enemy fire which killed or wounded many officers and men. When more than two-thirds of the men became seized with panic and retreated on the run, he remained with the party until dark when it came safely away, bringing its wounded, its arms and its colors.

== See also ==
- List of Medal of Honor recipients
- List of American Civil War Medal of Honor recipients: Q–S
