= Thomas Harcourt (Medal of Honor) =

- Born: c. 1841; Boston, Massachusetts, US
- Military career
- Allegiance: United States of America; Union
- Branch: United States Army; United States Navy
- Service years: 1863 - 1864 (USA); 1864 - 1865 (USN)
- Rank: Ordinary Seaman
- Unit: (United States Navy) USS Minnesota
- Conflicts: American Civil War • Second Battle of Fort Fisher
- Awards: Medal of Honor

Thomas Harcourt (c. 1841 – Unknown) was a U.S. sailor stationed aboard the USS Minnesota during the American Civil War. He received the Medal of Honor for his actions during the Second Battle of Fort Fisher on January 15, 1865.

== Military service ==
Harcourt enlisted in the Army from Haverhill, New Hampshire in 1863, but transferred to the Navy in April 1864 and was assigned to the Union frigate USS Minnesota. He later deserted in April 1865.

On January 15, 1865, the North Carolina Confederate stronghold of Fort Fisher was taken by a combined Union storming party of sailors, marines, and soldiers under the command of Admiral David Dixon Porter and General Alfred Terry. Harcourt was one of nine crewmen from the USS Minnesota who received the Medal of Honor for their actions during the battle.

== Medal of Honor citation ==
"The President of the United States of America, in the name of Congress, takes pleasure in presenting the Medal of Honor to Ordinary Seaman Thomas Harcourt, United States Navy, for extraordinary heroism in action on board the U.S.S. Minnesota in the assault on Fort Fisher, 15 January 1865. Landing on the beach with the assaulting party from his ship, Ordinary Seaman Harcourt advanced to the top of the sand hill and partly through the breach in the palisades despite enemy fire which killed or wounded many officers and men. When more than two-thirds of the men became seized with panic and retreated on the run, he remained with the party until dark when it came safely away, bringing its wounded, its arms and its colors."

General Orders: War Department, General Orders No. 59 (June 22, 1865)

Action Date: January 15, 1865

Service: Navy

Rank: Ordinary Seaman

Division: U.S.S. Minnesota

== See also ==
- List of Medal of Honor recipients
- List of American Civil War Medal of Honor recipients: G–L
- Second Battle of Fort Fisher
- USS Minnesota
