= Adam Weissel =

United States Navy sailor and Medal of Honor recipient

- Born: 1854; Germany
- Died: 10 December, 1928 (aged 73–74); Berkeley, California, U.S.
- Military career
- Allegiance: United States
- Branch: United States Navy
- Rank: Ship's Cook
- Unit: USS Minnesota
- Awards: Medal of Honor

Adam Weissel (1854 – 10 December 1928) was a United States Navy sailor and a recipient of the United States military's highest decoration, the Medal of Honor.

== Biography ==
Born in 1854 in Germany, Weissel immigrated to the United States and joined the Navy from New York. By 26 August 1881, he was serving as a ship's cook on the training ship USS Minnesota. On that day, while Minnesota was at Newport, Rhode Island, Captain of the Forecastle C. Lorenze fell overboard. Weissel jumped into the water and kept him afloat until they were picked up by one of the ship's small boats. For this action, he was awarded the Medal of Honor three years later, on 18 October 1884.

Weissel's official Medal of Honor citation reads:

For jumping overboard from the U.S. Training Ship Minnesota, at Newport, R.I., 26 August 1881, and sustaining until picked up by a boat from the ship, C. Lorenze, captain of the forecastle, who had fallen overboard.

In 1884, Weissel served as cook on the British ship Alert when it took part in the Arctic rescue of Adolphus Greely and his Lady Franklin Bay Expedition. Weissel died on 10 December 1928, at age 73 or 74.

== See also ==
- List of Medal of Honor recipients during peacetime
