= John Lucy =

- Born: 1859; New York City, US
- Died: Unknown
- Military career
- Allegiance: United States of America
- Branch: United States Navy
- Rank: Second Class Boy
- Unit: USS Minnesota
- Awards: Medal of Honor

John Lucy (born 1859, date of death unknown) was a United States Navy sailor and a recipient of the United States military's highest decoration, the Medal of Honor.

Born in 1859 in New York City, Lucy joined the Navy from that state. By July 9, 1876, he was serving as a second class boy on the training ship USS Minnesota. On that day, he "displayed heroic conduct" during a fire at the Castle Garden immigration facility in Manhattan. For this action, he was awarded the Medal of Honor weeks later, on July 27.

Lucy's official Medal of Honor citation reads:

Displayed heroic conduct while serving on board the U.S. Training Ship Minnesota on the occasion of the burning of Castle Garden at New York, 9 July 1876.

As Lucy was not more than 17 years old at the time of the incident, he is one of the youngest Medal of Honor recipients in history.

== See also ==
- List of Medal of Honor recipients in non-combat incidents
