= Landesman =

Landesman is a surname. Notable people with the surname include:

- Cosmo Landesman (born 1954), American journalist, son of Fran and Jay Landesman
- Fran Landesman (1927–2011) née Frances Deitsch, American lyricist and poet
- Jay Landesman (1919–2011), American publisher and bon viveur
- Rocco Landesman (born 1947), American theatre producer

== See also ==
- Landman (disambiguation)
- Landmann
- Lanzmann
- Heinrich Landesmann (1821–1902), Czech-Austrian poet
