= Landman =

Landman may refer to:

- Landsman (rank) (alternatively landman), a defunct naval rating
- Landman (oil worker), a person whose work is focused on mineral rights, to lands subject to oil (petroleum) and natural gas exploration, development and production
- Landman (surname)
- Landman (TV series), a television series created by Taylor Sheridan adapting the podcast Boomtown
- Landman, Kazakhstan, a rural locality

== See also ==
- Landmann
- Landsman
- Lanzmann
