= USS Lackawanna (1862) =

Sloops-of-war of the United States Navy

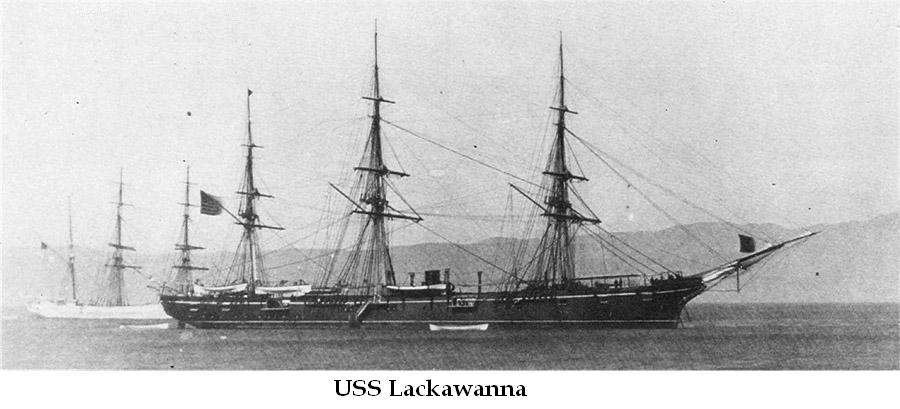

History

United States
- Name: USS Lackawanna
- Builder: New York Navy Yard, Brooklyn, New York
- Launched: 9 August 1862
- Commissioned: 8 January 1863
- Decommissioned: 20 July 1865
- Recommissioned: 7 May 1866
- Decommissioned: 10 February 1871
- Recommissioned: 8 May 1872
- Decommissioned: 7 April 1885
- Fate: Sold 30 July 1887

General characteristics
- Type: sloop-of-war
- Displacement: 1,533 long tons (1,558 t)
- Length: 237 ft (72 m)
- Beam: 38 ft 2 in (11.63 m)
- Draft: 16 ft 3 in (4.95 m)
- Propulsion: steam engine, screw-propelled
- Speed: 10.5 kn (12.1 mph; 19.4 km/h)
- Armament: 2 × 11 in (280 mm) Dahlgren smoothbores, 2 × 9 in (230 mm) Dahlgren smoothbores, 1 × 150-pounder Parrot rifled gun, 1 × 50-pounder Dahlgren rifled gun, 2 × 24-pounder howitzers, 2 × 12-pounder howitzers, 2 × 12-pounder rifled guns

The first USS Lackawanna was a screw-propelled sloop-of-war in the Union Navy during the American Civil War. She was named after the Lackawanna River in Pennsylvania.

== Construction and commissioning ==
Lackawanna was launched by the New York Navy Yard at Brooklyn, New York, on 9 August 1862, sponsored by Ms. Imogen Page Cooper, and was commissioned on 8 January 1863, Captain John B. Marchand in command.

== Civil War ==
The new screw sloop-of-war departed New York on 20 January 1863 to join the Union blockade of the Confederate coast. She reported to the West Gulf Blockading Squadron at Pensacola, Florida, early in February 1863 and for the remainder of the war served along the Gulf Coast of the Confederacy, principally off Mobile Bay, Alabama. Lackawanna took her first prize – Neptune – on 14 June 1863 after a long chase in which the 200 long tons (200 t) Glasgow-registered ship had jettisoned her cargo trying to escape. Lacakwanna scored again the next day, capturing the steamer Planter as the blockade runner attempted a dash from Mobile, Alabama, to Havana, Cuba, laden with cotton and resin.

Following duty along the Texas coast near Galveston in March and April 1864, Lackawanna returned to the blockade of Mobile early in May 1864 to prevent the escape of the Confederate ram CSS Tennessee. During the summer of 1864 she served in the blockade while preparing for Rear Admiral David Farragut's conquest of Mobile Bay.

On 9 July 1864, with Monongahela, Galena, and Sebago, she braved the guns of Fort Morgan to shell the steamer Virgin, a large blockade runner aground at the entrance of Mobile Bay. Their guns forced a Confederate river steamer to abandon efforts to assist Virgin, but the next day the Confederates refloated the blockade runner, which reached safety in Mobile Bay.

Closing Mobile was an important part of the Union strategy to isolate and subdue the Confederacy. At dawn on the morning of 5 August 1864, Farragut's ships crossed the bar and entered Mobile Bay. A field of naval mines and a Confederate squadron led by CSS Tennessee blocked their advance. Farragut's lead monitor, Tecumseh, struck a mine and sank in seconds. The Confederate flagship, Tennessee, vainly tried to ram Brooklyn, and the action became general, raging for more than an hour. At one point in the struggle, Lackawanna rammed Tennessee at full speed, causing Tennessee to list, and later Lackawanna collided with Farragut's flagship Hartford while attempting to ram Tennessee again, shortly before Tennessee struck her colors. Farragut's success in the Battle of Mobile Bay closed the last major Confederate port on the Gulf of Mexico.

Twelve of Lackawanna's sailors received the Medal of Honor for their actions during the battle:

- Seaman John M. Burns
- Landsman Michael Cassidy
- Landsman Louis G. Chaput
- Landsman Patrick Dougherty
- Captain of the Top John Edwards
- Landsman Samuel W. Kinnaird
- Seaman Adam McCullock
- Boatswain's Mate William Phinney
- Captain of Forecastle John Smith
- Armorer George Taylor
- Quarter Gunner James Ward
- Quartermaster Daniel Whitfield

Following the victory at Mobile Bay, Lackawanna continued to operate in the Gulf of Mexico, enforcing the blockade until after the end of the Civil War in April 1865. She departed Key West, Florida, on 24 June 1865, reached New York City on the 28 June 1865, and decommissioned at New York Navy Yard on 20 July 1865.

== Post-war ==
=== Pacific, 1866–1885 ===
Recommissioned on 7 May 1866, Commander William Reynolds in command, Lackawanna sailed for the South Atlantic Ocean on 4 August 1866, transited the Strait of Magellan on 9 November, and arrived at Honolulu in the Kingdom of Hawaii on 9 February 1867. Lackawanna hen sailed to Midway Atoll in the Northwestern Hawaiian Islands, and on 28 August 1867 Captain Reynolds took formal possession of the atoll for the United States. In 1867, she also surveyed what is now called Kure Atoll, to the west northwest of Midway, to produce more accurate charts of the reefs there, which had been causing shipwrecks. Lackawanna continued to operate in the Pacific Ocean, primarily in the Hawaiian Islands and along the coasts of California and Mexico, until she arrived at Mare Island Navy Yard in California, for decommissioning on 10 February 1871.

Recommissioning on 8 May 1872, Lackawanna departed for East Asia on 22 June 1872 and served in the Far East until returning to the United States, arriving at San Francisco, California, on 23 April 1875. In October 1880, in the midst of the War of the Pacific, Lackawanna sailed for the South Pacific to host a diplomatic conference proposed by the United States to end the war. The Arica Conference, also known as the USS Lackawanna Conference, took place at the port of Arica, which was then part of Peru but was ceded to Chile after the war. Officials from the countries involved in the war – Peru, Chile, and Bolivia – did not reach an immediate agreement and U.S. efforts failed.

Except for two brief periods in ordinary, Lackawanna continued to operate in the Pacific for the next 12 years. On 16 March 1883 at Honolulu, Captain of the Hold Louis Williams jumped overboard and rescued a fellow sailor from drowning, for which he was awarded the Medal of Honor. A year later, at Callao, Peru, on 13 June 1884, Williams again rescued a man from drowning, along with Ordinary Seaman Isaac L. Fasseur. Both Williams and Fasseur were awarded a Medal of Honor for this act, making Williams one of the few two-time recipients of the award.

Lackawanna decommissioned for the last time at Mare Island Navy Yard on 7 April 1885 and was sold there to W. T. Garratt & Company on 30 July 1887.
