= Landman (surname) =

Landman is a Dutch surname, meaning "country man", "farmer". Notable people with the surname include:

- Ada Louise Landman Huxtable (1921–2013), American architecture critic, niece of Isaac
- Andrès Landman (born 1976), Dutch marathon speed skater
- Chris Landman (born 1981), Dutch darts player
- Elani Landman (born 1993), South African squash player
- Emil Landman (born 1989), Dutch folk musician
- Fred Landman (born 1956), Dutch-born Israeli professor of semantics
- Isaac Landman (1880–1946), Russian-born American rabbi and anti-Zionist activist, uncle of Ada Louise
- Jonathan Landman (born 1952), American journalist
- Kerry Landman, Australian applied mathematician and philanthropist
- Ligtoring Landman (born 1986), South African rugby player
- Nate Landman (born 1998), American football player
- Roy Landman (1914–1990), American singer known as "Snooky Lanson"
- Tanya Landman (born 1950), English author of children's and young adult books
- Uzi Landman (born 1944), American computational physicist
- Wim Landman (1921–1975), Dutch football goalkeeper
- Yuri Landman (born 1973), Dutch artist and musical instrument maker

== See also ==
- Landmann, German cognate surname
- Landsman, variant Dutch form
- Lansman, British form
- Länsman, Scandinavian form
