= Landmann =

Landmann is a surname. Notable people with this surname include:

- Barbara Heinemann Landmann (1795–1883), German spiritual leader
- George Thomas Landmann (1779–1854), British civil engineer
- Ludwig Landmann (1868–1945), first Jewish Mayor of Frankfurt
- Salcia Landmann (1911–2002), Austrian-born Jewish writer and wife of the philosopher Michael Landmann
- Valentin Landmann (1950–), Swiss criminal defence attorney and politician, son of Salcia Landmann

== See also ==
- Landman (disambiguation)
- Landman (surname)
- Lansman
- Länsman
- Lanzmann
- Heinrich Landesmann (1821–1902), Austrian poet and philosophical writer
