= Charles Baker (Medal of Honor) =

Union Navy sailor in the American Civil War

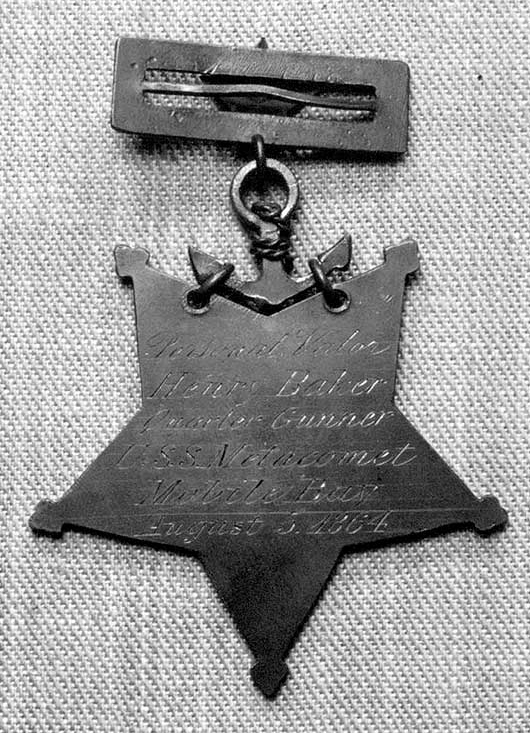
- Reverse of Baker's Medal of Honor
- Born: 1809; Georgetown, Washington, D.C.
- Died: August 3, 1891 (aged 81–82)
- Burial place: Mount Moriah Cemetery, Philadelphia
- Military career
- Allegiance: United States of America; Union
- Branch: United States Navy
- Rank: Quarter Gunner
- Unit: USS Metacomet
- Conflicts: American Civil War • Battle of Mobile Bay
- Awards: Medal of Honor

Charles Baker (1809 – August 3, 1891), also known as Henry Baker, was a Union Navy sailor in the American Civil War and a recipient of the U.S. military's highest decoration, the Medal of Honor, for his actions at the Battle of Mobile Bay.

== Biography ==
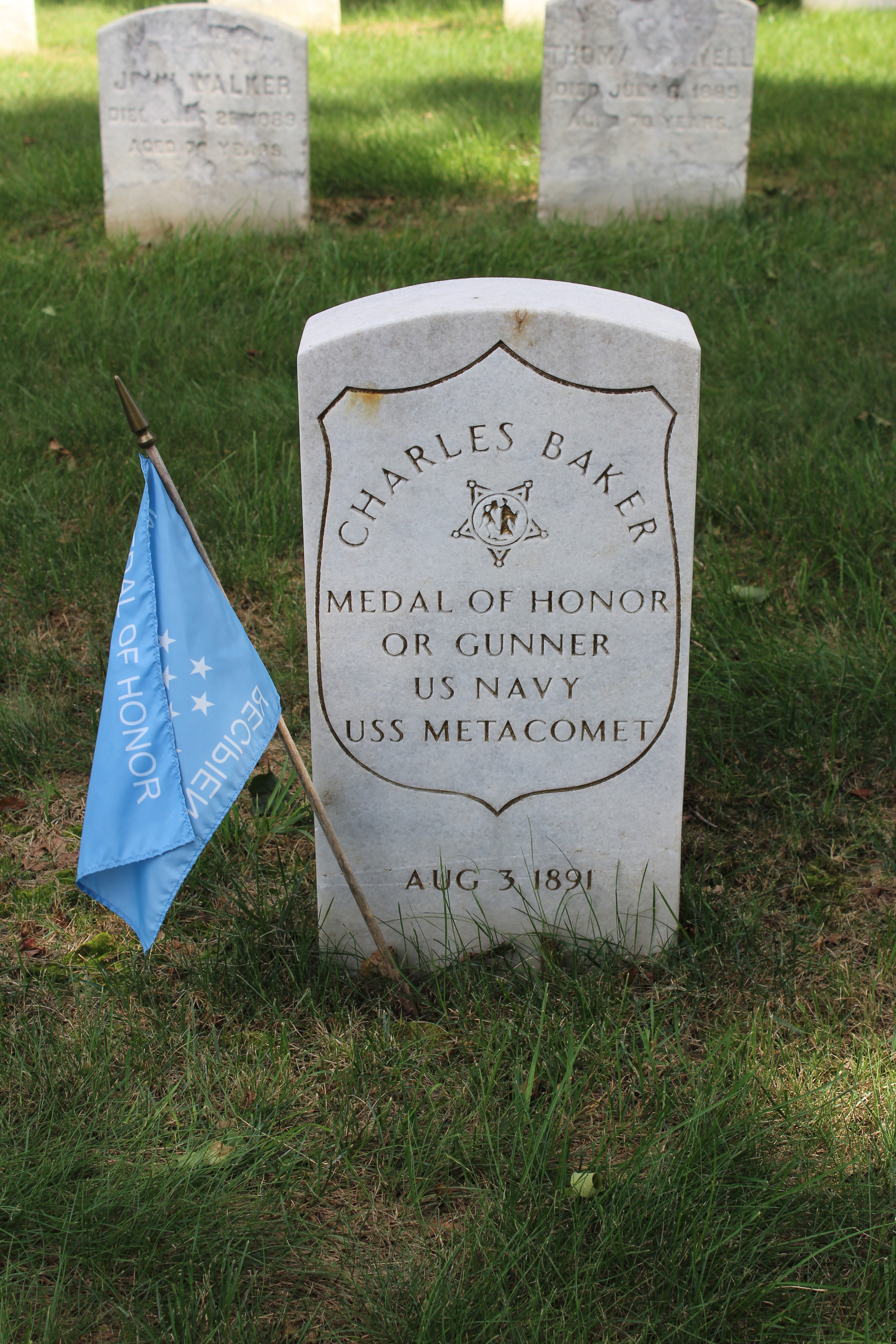
Charles Baker headstone in Mount Moriah Cemetery Naval Plot

Born in 1809 in the Georgetown area of Washington, D.C., Baker was living in New York City when he joined the Navy. He served during the Civil War as a quarter gunner on the USS Metacomet. At the Battle of Mobile Bay on August 5, 1864, he was among the crew of a small boat sent from Metacomet to rescue survivors of the USS Tecumseh, which had been sunk by a naval mine (then known as "torpedoes"). Despite intense fire, the boat crew was able to pull ten Tecumseh men from the water. For this action, Baker was awarded the Medal of Honor a year and a half later, on January 15, 1866. Baker's first name is given in some records as "Henry", and his medal is inscribed with that name. Five other members of the boat crew also received the Medal of Honor: Seaman James Avery, Ordinary Seaman John C. Donnelly, Captain of the Forecastle John Harris, Seaman Henry Johnson, and Landsman Daniel Noble.

Baker's official Medal of Honor citation reads:

Served on board the U.S.S. Metacomet. As a member of the boat's crew which went to the rescue of the U.S. monitor Tecumseh when that vessel was struck by a torpedo in passing the enemy forts in Mobile Bay, 5 August 1864, Q.G. Baker braved the enemy fire which was said by the admiral [ David Farragut ] to be "one of the most galling" he had ever seen, and aided in rescuing from death 10 of the crew of the Tecumseh, eliciting the admiration of both friend and foe.

Baker died on August 3, 1891, at age 80 or 81 and was buried at Mount Moriah Cemetery in lot 296 of the Naval Plot.

== See also ==
- List of American Civil War Medal of Honor recipients: A-F
