= Lansman =

Lansman is a surname. Notable people with the surname include:

- Jeffry Lansman (born 1951), American neuroscientist
- Jeremy Lansman (1942 – 2024) American radio engineer, station creator, and producer
- Jon Lansman (born 1957), British political activist
- Luna Lansman, Mexican drag performer

== See also ==
- Landman (surname)
- Landmann
- Länsman
