= Ingrid Deltenre =

Dutch-Swiss manager

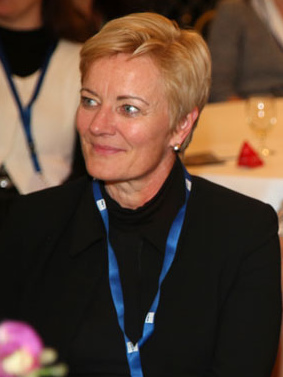
- Deltenre in 2013

Director-General of the European Broadcasting Union
- In office 2010–2017
- Preceded by: Jean Réveillon
- Succeeded by: Noel Curran

Director of Schweizer Fernsehen
- In office 2004–2009
- Preceded by: Peter Schellenberg

Personal details
- Born: Ingrid Ella Deltenre; 25 August 1960 (age 66) Wettingen, Aargau, Switzerland
- Domestic partner: Sacha Wigdorovits
- Education: University of Zurich

Ingrid Ella Deltenre (born 25 August 1960) is a Dutch-Swiss manager who was director of the German-speaking broadcaster Schweizer Fernsehen from 2004 to 2009 and the director-general of the broadcasters association, the European Broadcasting Union, between 2010 and 2017. She was the Secretary General of the Swiss Media Association from 1989 to 1991 and is a member of the board of various companies.

== Early life and education ==
On 25 August 1960, Deltenre was born a Dutch national in Wettingen in the Swiss canton of Aargau to Dutch parents. Her father worked as an engineer at the electronics and mechanical engineering group Brown, Boveri & Cie, and the family frequently resided abroad for long periods of time. Between 1982 and 1989 Deltenre studied at the University of Zurich for a master's degree in education, journalism and biological anthropology.

== Career ==
In 1989 Deltenre began her working career as the Secretary General of the Swiss Media Association and was also Project Manager at the Media Research Department, responsible for audience research and electronic media. Between 1991 and 1998, she worked at the Ringier Media Group in various positions such as managing director, head of marketing, as well as project manager of business development. Deltenre was chief marketing officer and member of the executive committee at Swisscard between 1998 and 1999, and also worked at multimedia marketer publisuisse as its director from 1999 to 2004. She was the publishing director of the business newspaper Cash for half a decade.

On 1 January 2004, Deltenre was elected director of the German-speaking broadcaster Schweizer Fernsehen (SF), succeeding Peter Schellenberg. She was the first woman to be appointed head of Swiss German television, and the appointment was considered controversial as critics felt she had too little journalistic experience. In June 2009, Deltenre was chosen to succeed Jean Réveillon as the director-general of the Geneva-based broadcasters association, the European Broadcasting Union (EBU), by its board and left SF to take up her new post on 1 January 2010. There she oversaw the direction of the Eurovision Song Contest and negotiated the rights to broadcast major sporting events for members of the EBU. In 2015, Deltenre received a second term as EBU's director-general that would last from January 2016 to January 2019.

in September 2017 Ingrid Deltenre left the EBU to focus on her responsibilities on various boards, providing them her knowledge of digitisation, environmental and social governance, human resources, and marketing. As director-general she was succeeded by Noel Curran, the Director-General of RTÉ.

== Other activities ==
Deltenre was president of the board of directors of SF's production company Technology and production center Switzerland from April 2005 to 18 November 2010. Since 2023 the extern expert has been at the helm of the ORF ethics commission.

=== Corporate boards ===
- Akara Funds, member of the board of directors (since 2020)
- Deutsche Post, member of the supervisory board (since 2016)
- Banque cantonale vaudoise, non-executive member of the board of directors
- Givaudan, non-executive member of the board of directors
- Agence France-Presse, non-executive member of the board of directors
- Sunrise UPC, non-executive member of the board of directors

=== Non-profit organizations ===
- University of Zurich, chair of the supervisory body of the executive MBA program
- Schweizer Berghilfe, member of the board of trustees

== Recognition ==
Ingrid Deltenre was Swiss Board Member of the Year 2019.

== Personal life ==
Her partner is the public relations consultant Sacha Wigdorovits. They do not have children; being childfree was a choice Deltenre made when she was younger to ensure her independence and to avoid taking on parental duties. In late 2009 she became a naturalised Swiss citizen.
