= Patrick Murphy (Medal of Honor) =

Irish-born US Navy sailor, Medal of Honor recipient

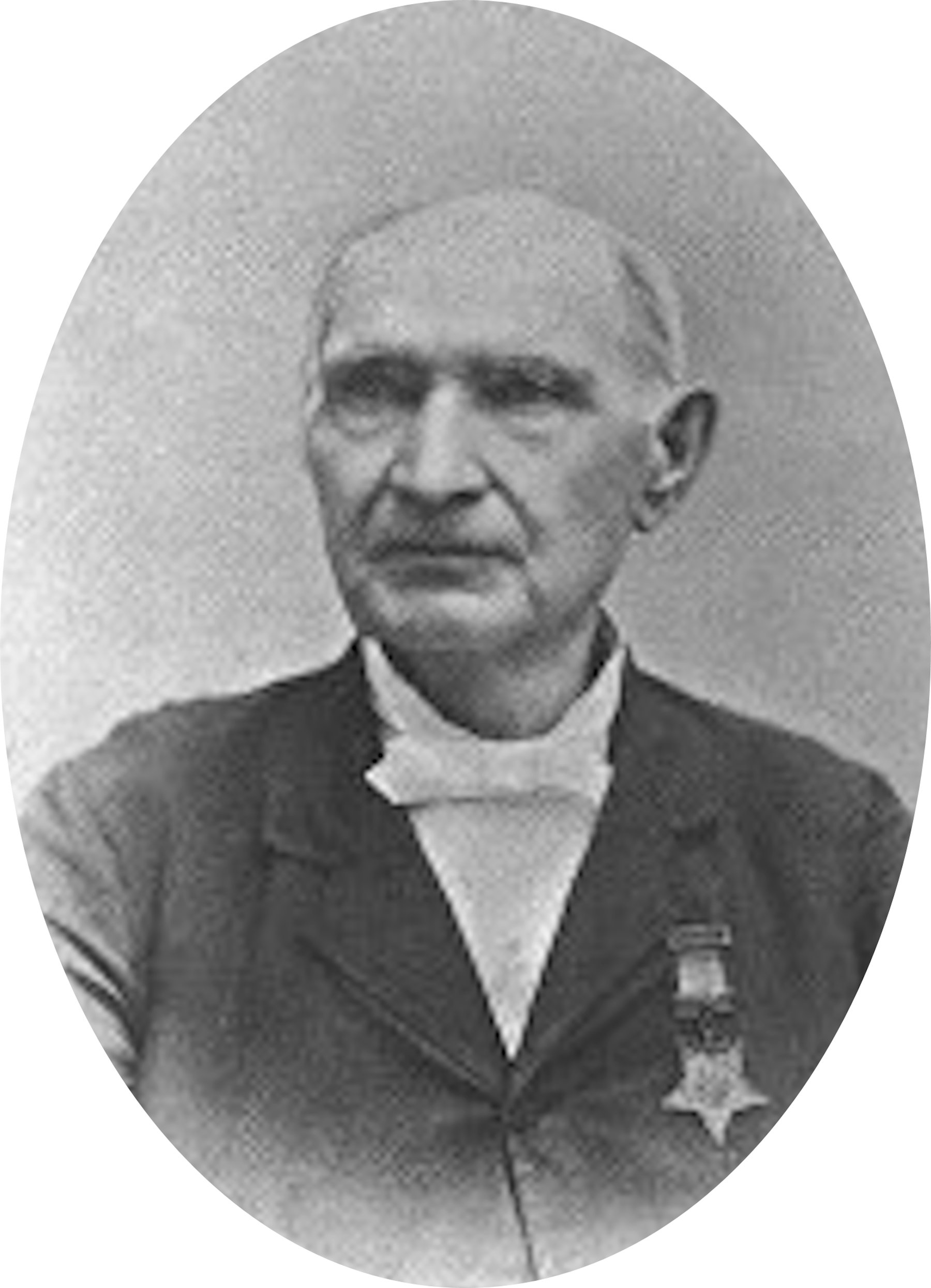
- Patrick Murphy 1895
- Born: January 15, 1823; Waterford, Ireland
- Died: December 1, 1896 (aged 73); Erie, Pennsylvania, U.S.
- Burial place: Trinity Cemetery, Erie, Pennsylvania
- Military career
- Allegiance: United Kingdom; United States
- Branch: Royal Navy; United States Navy
- Service years: 1840–1842 (UK); 1844–1885 (USA)
- Rank: Boatswain (warrant officer)
- Units: (United Kingdom) HMS Montreal (United States Navy) USS Michigan (United States Navy) USS Metacomet
- Conflicts: American Civil War • Battle of Mobile Bay
- Awards: Medal of Honor

Patrick Murphy (January 15, 1823 – December 1, 1896) was a Union Navy sailor in the American Civil War and a recipient of the U.S. military's highest decoration, the Medal of Honor, for his actions at the Battle of Mobile Bay. A native of Ireland, Murphy began his seafaring career as a teenager aboard merchant ships in the North Atlantic and served for two years in the Royal Navy. He joined the U.S. Navy after settling in Erie, Pennsylvania, and sailed the Great Lakes as a petty officer on USS Michigan. During the American Civil War, he served aboard USS Metacomet and distinguished himself in the action at Mobile Bay. He returned to Erie and USS Michigan after the war, continuing on that ship for twenty more years until retiring as a warrant officer.

== Early years ==
Murphy was born on January 15, 1823, in Waterford, Ireland, the son of produce dealer James Murphy (1786–1861) and his wife Ellen Murphy (née Mansfield). He had four siblings: James, Mary, John, and William. At age 14 he began a three-year term as a boy seaman aboard merchant ships sailing to North America. He then joined the Royal Navy, serving two years on the Great Lakes on board HMS Montreal.

== U.S. Navy service ==
In 1842, Murphy settled in Erie, Pennsylvania, where he helped outfit the newly built ship Michigan. When the ship was commissioned into the U.S. Navy as USS Michigan on September 26, 1844, Murphy followed it into the service. He sailed aboard Michigan as a quartermaster for three years, then two years as a captain of the hold, and was subsequently promoted to quarter gunner, boatswain's mate, and, in 1861, acting master's mate. Later in 1861 he left Michigan and joined Admiral David Dixon Porter's fleet as an acting ensign, serving for eight months until illness forced him to return home to Erie for three months of recuperation.

Upon regaining his health, Murphy traveled to New York City and joined USS Metacomet as a boatswain's mate, for service in the American Civil War. At the Battle of Mobile Bay on August 5, 1864, he "performed his duties with skill and courage" despite heavy fire. For this action, he was awarded the Medal of Honor three years later, on October 3, 1867. He later achieved the rank of chief boatswain's mate.

Murphy's official Medal of Honor citation reads:

Served as boatswain's mate on board the U.S.S. Metacomet, during action against rebel forts and gunboats and with the ram Tennessee in Mobile Bay, 5 August 1864. Despite damage to his ship and the loss of several men on board as enemy fire raked her decks, Murphy performed his duties with skill and courage throughout a furious 2-hour battle which resulted in the surrender of the rebel ram Tennessee and in the damaging and destruction of batteries at Fort Morgan.

After the end of the war, Murphy returned to Erie and rejoined USS Michigan in 1865, serving as quartermaster and pilot. He was appointed to the warrant officer rank of boatswain on January 28, 1882, which he held until his retirement in 1885.

== Personal life ==
On December 26, 1845, Murphy married Bridget Calligee of Erie. The couple had two sons: James, who became an actor, and William P., who died in infancy. From 1853 to 1857, Murphy owned and commanded the schooner William Adair in the freight trade. He was a member of the Catholic Church and the Union veterans' organization the Grand Army of the Republic. In addition to his home on East Sixth Street, he owned several other properties in Erie. He died on December 1, 1896, at age 73.
