= James Ward (Medal of Honor, 1864) =

- Born: c. 1833; New York City
- Military career
- Allegiance: United States
- Branch: United States Navy
- Rank: Quarter Gunner
- Unit: USS Lackawanna
- Conflicts: American Civil War • Battle of Mobile Bay
- Awards: Medal of Honor

James Ward (born c. 1833, date of death unknown) was a Union Navy sailor in the American Civil War and a recipient of the U.S. military's highest decoration, the Medal of Honor, for his actions at the Battle of Mobile Bay.

Born in 1833 in New York City, Ward was still living in the state of New York when he joined the Navy. He served during the Civil War as a quarter gunner on the USS Lackawanna. At the Battle of Mobile Bay on August 5, 1864, he was wounded as his ship engaged the CSS Tennessee at close range. Refusing to go below decks, he instead manned a gun after its crew had become casualties, and then took depth soundings ("heaved the lead") from platforms on the side of the ship's hull (known as the chains) until nearly being crushed when Lackawanna rammed Tennessee. For this action, he was awarded the Medal of Honor four months later, on December 31, 1864.

Ward's official Medal of Honor citation reads:

Serving as gunner on board the U.S.S. Lackawanna during successful attacks against Fort Morgan, rebel gunboats and the ram Tennessee in Mobile Bay, 5 August 1864. Although wounded and ordered below, Ward refused to go, but rendered aid at one of the guns when the crew was disabled. He subsequently remained in the chains, heaving the lead, until nearly caught in the collision with the ram Tennessee. He continued to serve bravely throughout the action which resulted in the capture of the prize ram Tennessee and in the damaging and destruction of Fort Morgan.
