= John Harris (Medal of Honor) =

United States Navy sailor (1839–?)

- Civil War era Navy Medal of Honor
- Born: c. 1839
- Military career
- Allegiance: United States of America; Union
- Branch: United States Navy; Union Navy
- Rank: Captain of the Forecastle
- Unit: (United States Navy) USS Metacomet
- Conflicts: American Civil War; *Battle of Mobile Bay
- Awards: Medal of Honor

John Harris (born c. 1839, date of death unknown) was a Union Navy sailor who received the Medal of Honor for his service on USS Metacomet in Mobile Bay during the American Civil War.

Born in 1839, Harris was living in New York when he joined the Navy. He served during the Civil War as a captain of the forecastle on USS Metacomet. At the Battle of Mobile Bay on August 5, 1864, he was among the crew of a small boat sent from Metacomet to rescue survivors of USS Tecumseh, which had been sunk by a naval mine (then known as a "torpedo"). Despite intense fire, the boat crew was able to pull ten Tecumseh men from the water. For this action, Harris was awarded the Medal of Honor a year and a half later, on January 15, 1866. Five other members of the boat crew also received the medal: Seaman James Avery, Quarter Gunner Charles Baker, Ordinary Seaman John C. Donnelly, Seaman Henry Johnson, and Landsman Daniel Noble.

== Medal of Honor citation ==
As captain of the forecastle on board the U.S.S. Metacomet, Harris was a member of the boat's crew which went to the rescue of the officers and crew of the U.S. Monitor Tecumseh, when that vessel was struck by a torpedo in passing the enemy forts in Mobile Bay, 5 August 1864 Harris braved the enemy fire which was said by the admiral [ David Farragut ] to be "one of the most galling" he had ever seen, and aided in rescuing from death 10 of the crew of the Tecumseh, thereby eliciting the admiration of both friend and foe.

== See also ==
- List of Medal of Honor recipients
- Battle of Mobile Bay
- USS Metacomet
