= Lorm alphabet =

Hand-touch alphabet for tactile signing

The Lorm alphabet is a method of tactile signing named after Hieronymus Lorm, who developed it in the late 19th century. Letters are spelled by tapping or stroking different parts of the listener's hand. The Lorm alphabet is mostly used in German-speaking countries, the Netherlands, Czech Republic, Poland and Georgia.

== Alphabet ==
Lorm alphabet for German

Lorm alphabet for Czech

Lorm alphabet for English

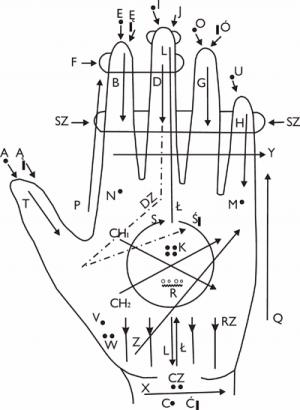
Lorm alphabet for Polish

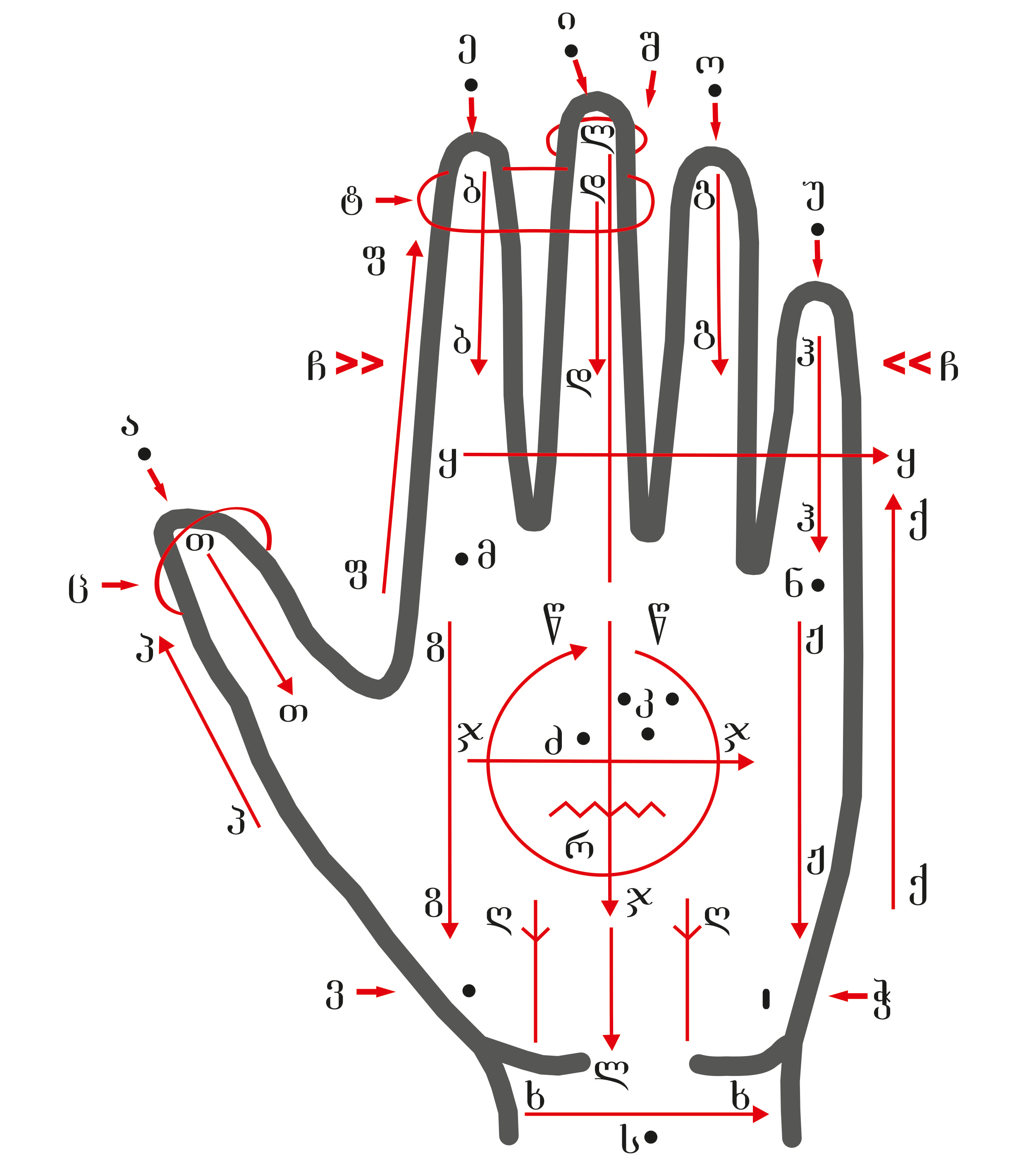
Lorm alphabet for Georgian

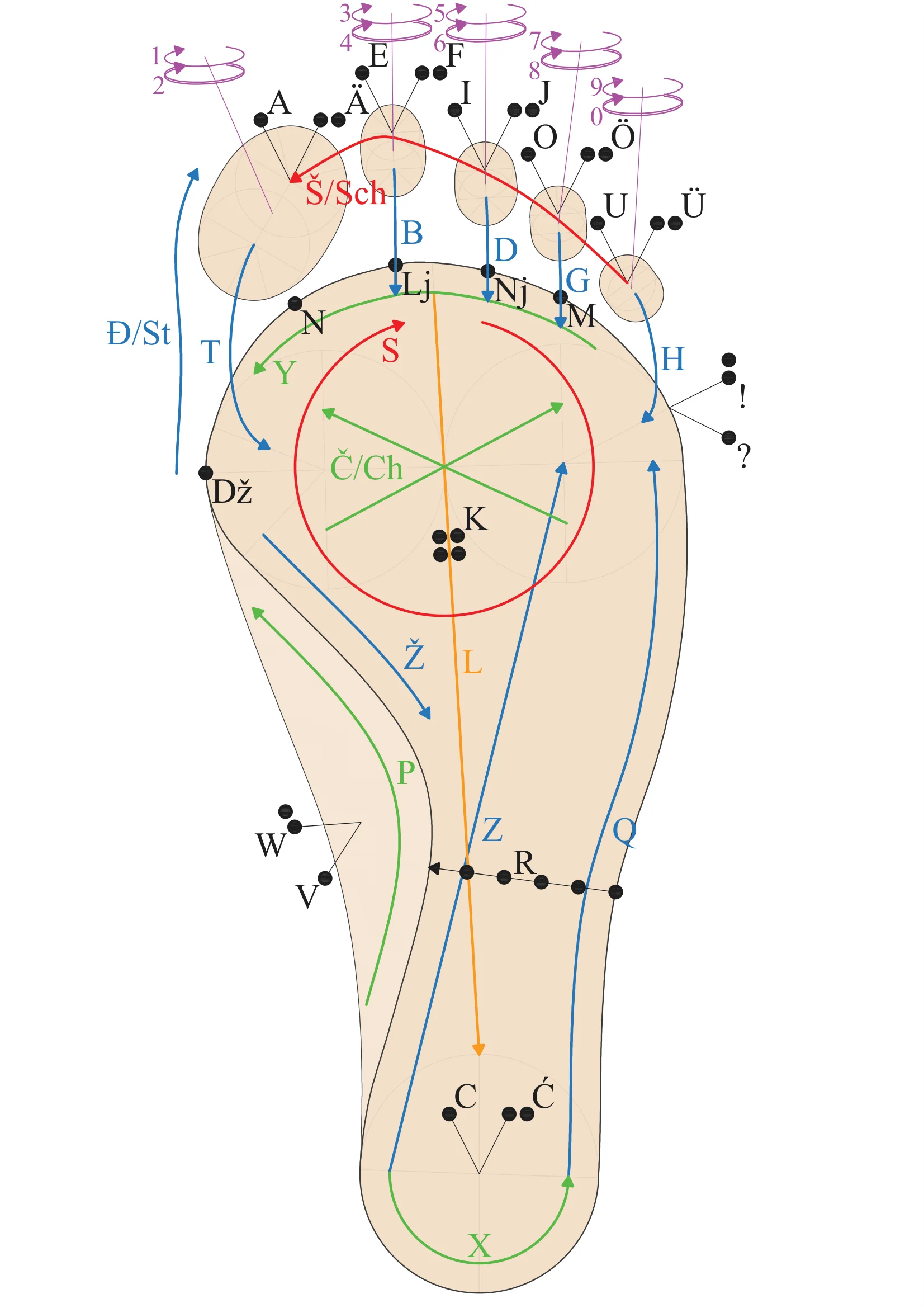
Lorm alphabet adapted for people who do not have or cannot use their hands. Two additional gestures: 1.) A sliding touch from the edge of the heel to the tips of the toes marks the end of each sentence unless it is a question or an exclamation. 2.) A full palm-to-sole touch indicates the end of a conversation or a change of speaker. It is adapted for most Germanic, Slavic and Romance languages.

For the German language the following signs are used:

A	Tap on the tip of the thumb
B	Short stroke on the index finger
C	Tap on the wrist
D	Short stroke on the middle finger
E	Tap on the index fingertip
F	Lightly squeeze the ends of the index and middle fingers
G	Short stroke on the ring finger
H	Short stroke on the little finger
I	Tap on the middle fingertip
J	Double tap on the middle fingertip
K	Tap with four fingertips on the palm
L	Long stroke from the end of the middle finger to the wrist
M	Tap on the base of the little finger
N	Tap on the base of the index finger
O	Tap on the ring fingertip
P	Long stroke on the outside of the index finger
Q	Long stroke on the outside of the hand (little finger side)
R	Light drumming of the fingers on the palm
S	Circle on the palm
T	Stroke on the thumb
U	Tap on the little fingertip
V	Tap on the ball of the thumb, slightly outside
W	Double tap on the ball of the thumb
X	Stroke across the wrist
Y	Stroke over the fingers in the middle
Z	Oblique stroke from the ball of the thumb to the base of the little finger
Ä	Double tap on the tip of the thumb
Ö	Double tap on the ring fingertip
Ü	Double tap on the little fingertip
CH	Oblique cross on the palm
SCH	Lightly grasping fingers II – V
ST	Long stroke on the outside of the thumb

=== Signals ===
The following signals may also be used:

- Word ends can be signaled by a light tap on the palm.
- Word misunderstood or request to repeat can be signaled by closing the hand into a fist.
- Mistake by speaker can be signaled by rubbing the hand. The whole word must be repeated.
