= James Avery (Medal of Honor) =

American Civil War sailor and Medal of Honor recipient

- Medal of Honor recipient
- Born: c. 1825; Scotland
- Died: October 11, 1898 (aged 72–73)
- Burial place: Captain Ted Conaway Memorial Naval Cemetery; Portsmouth, Virginia
- Military career
- Allegiance: United States of America; Union
- Branch: United States Navy; Union Navy
- Rank: Seaman
- Unit: USS Metacomet (1863)
- Conflicts: American Civil War
- Awards: Medal of Honor

James Avery (c. 1825 – October 11, 1898) was an American Civil War Union Navy sailor who received the Medal of Honor while serving aboard USS Metacomet.

== Biography ==
Born in 1825 in Scotland, Avery was living in New York when he joined the Navy. He served during the Civil War as a seaman on USS Metacomet. At the Battle of Mobile Bay on August 5, 1864, he was among the crew of a small boat sent from Metacomet to rescue survivors of USS Tecumseh, which had been sunk by a naval mine (then known as a "torpedo"). Despite intense fire, the boat crew was able to pull ten Tecumseh men from the water. For this action, Avery was awarded the Medal of Honor a year and a half later, on January 15, 1866. Five other members of the Metacomet boat crew also received the medal: Quarter Gunner Charles Baker, Ordinary Seaman John C. Donnelly, Captain of the Forecastle John Harris, Seaman Henry Johnson, and Landsman Daniel Noble.

Many years after the war Avery was serving as a berth-deck cook and it was discovered by the captain that he had won a medal of honor. When asked about the medal he said:

"That can tell you more about it than I can. I did like the rest of the men that day, and I never expected anything more than my pay and rations. We tried to do our duty, and when we saw the men in the other ship being shot down and some drowning, we could only try to help them. God knows it was hard to see them being murdered without much chance for escape"

This incident was reported in the New York Times on January 16, 1898.

Avery later served in one of the bureaus of the Navy Department.

He died on October 11, 1898.

== Medal of Honor citation ==
Rank and organization: Seaman, U.S. Navy. Born: 1825, Scotland. Accredited to: New York. G.O. No.: 71, January 15, 1866.

Citation:

Served on board the U.S.S. Metacomet. As a member of the boat's crew which went to the rescue of the U.S. monitor Tecumseh when that vessel was struck by a torpedo in passing the enemy forts in Mobile Bay, 5 August 1864, S/man Avery braved the enemy fire which was said by the admiral David Farragut to be "one of the most galling" he had ever seen, and aided in rescuing from death 10 of the crew of the Tecumseh, eliciting the admiration of both friend and foe.

== See also ==
- List of American Civil War Medal of Honor recipients: A–F
