= Patrick Dougherty (Medal of Honor) =

- Born: c. 1844; Ireland
- Military career
- Allegiance: United States
- Branch: United States Navy
- Rank: Landsman
- Unit: USS Lackawanna
- Conflicts: American Civil War • Battle of Mobile Bay
- Awards: Medal of Honor

Patrick Dougherty (born about 1844, date of death unknown) was a Union Navy sailor in the American Civil War and a recipient of the U.S. military's highest decoration, the Medal of Honor, for his actions at the Battle of Mobile Bay.

Born in about 1844 in Ireland, Dougherty immigrated to the United States and was living in New York when he joined the U.S. Navy. He served during the Civil War as a landsman on the USS Lackawanna. At the Battle of Mobile Bay on August 5, 1864, Lackawanna engaged the CSS Tennessee at close range and the powder boy at the gun Dougherty was manning became a casualty. Dougherty voluntarily took over the powder boy's duties, supplying gunpowder to his artillery piece throughout the battle. For this action, he was awarded the Medal of Honor four months later, on December 31, 1864.

Dougherty's official Medal of Honor citation reads:

As a landsman on board the U.S.S. Lackawanna, Dougherty acted gallantly without orders when the powder boy at his gun was disabled under the heavy enemy fire, and maintained a supply of powder throughout the prolonged action. Dougherty also aided in the attacks on Fort Morgan and in the capture of the prize ram Tennessee.
