= Thomas Taylor (Medal of Honor) =

- Born: c. 1834; Bangor, Maine
- Military career
- Allegiance: United States
- Branch: United States Navy
- Rank: Coxswain
- Unit: USS Metacomet
- Conflicts: American Civil War • Battle of Mobile Bay
- Awards: Medal of Honor

Thomas Taylor (born c. 1834, date of death unknown) was a Union Navy sailor in the American Civil War and a recipient of the U.S. military's highest decoration, the Medal of Honor, for his actions at the Battle of Mobile Bay.

Born in about 1834 in Bangor, Maine, Taylor was still living in that city when he joined the Navy. He served during the Civil War as a coxswain on the USS Metacomet. At the Battle of Mobile Bay on August 5, 1864, he "encouraged the men of the forward pivot gun when the officer in command displayed cowardice". For this action, he was awarded the Medal of Honor a year later on June 22, 1865.

Taylor's official Medal of Honor citation reads:

Served on board the U.S.S. Metacomet during the action against rebel forts and gunboats and with the rebel ram Tennessee in Mobile Bay, 5 August 1864. Despite damage to his ship and the loss of several men on board as enemy fire raked her decks, Taylor encouraged the men of the forward pivot gun when the officer in command displayed cowardice, doing honor to the occasion.
