= Samuel W. Kinnaird =

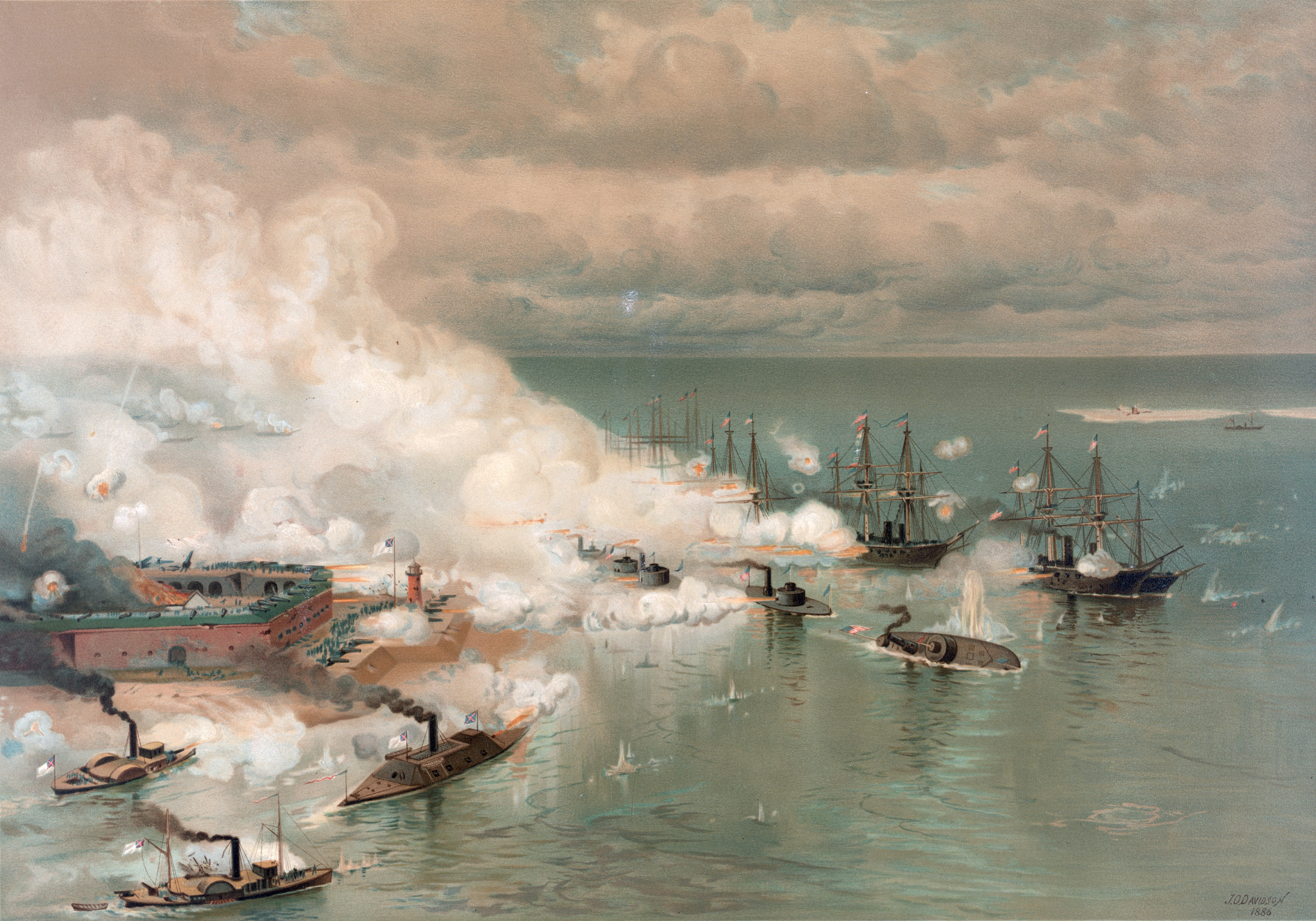
- The Battle of Mobile Bay
- Born: May 2, 1840; New York City
- Died: April 20, 1923 (aged 82)
- Burial place: Woodside, New York City
- Military career
- Allegiance: United States
- Branch: United States Navy
- Rank: Landsman
- Unit: USS Lackawanna
- Conflicts: American Civil War • Battle of Mobile Bay
- Awards: Medal of Honor

Samuel W. Kinnaird (May 2, 1840 – April 20, 1923) was a Union Navy sailor in the American Civil War and a recipient of the U.S. military's highest decoration, the Medal of Honor, for his actions at the Battle of Mobile Bay.

== Kinnaird's Background ==
Born on May 2, 1840, in New York City, Kinnaird was still living in the state of New York when he joined the Navy. He served during the Civil War as a landsman on the USS Lackawanna. At the Battle of Mobile Bay on August 5, 1864, Lackawanna engaged the CSS Tennessee at close range and Kinnaird displayed "presence of mind and cheerfulness" which helped maintain his shipmates' morale. For this action, he was awarded the Medal of Honor four months later, on December 31, 1864.

== Citation ==
Kinnaird's official Medal of Honor citation reads:

Served as a landsman on board the U.S.S. Lackawanna during successful attacks against Fort Morgan, rebel gunboats and the ram Tennessee in Mobile Bay, 5 August 1864. Showing a presence of mind and cheerfulness that had much to do with maintaining the crew's morale, Kinnaird served gallantly through the action which resulted in the capture of the prize rebel ram Tennessee and in the destruction of batteries at Fort Morgan.

Kinnaird died on April 20, 1923, at age 82 and was buried in the New York City neighborhood of Woodside, Queens.
