= Adam McCullock =

American Medal of Honor recipient

- Born: 1834; Maine
- Military career
- Allegiance: United States
- Branch: United States Navy
- Rank: Seaman
- Unit: (United States Navy) USS Lackawanna
- Conflicts: American Civil War • Battle of Mobile Bay
- Awards: Medal of Honor

Adam McCullock (born 1834) was a Union Navy sailor in the American Civil War and a recipient of the U.S. military's highest decoration, the Medal of Honor, for his actions at the Battle of Mobile Bay.

Born in 1834 in Maine, McCullock was living in Augusta when he joined the Navy. He served during the Civil War as a seaman on the USS Lackawanna. At the Battle of Mobile Bay on August 5, 1864, Lackawanna engaged the CSS Tennessee at close range and McCullock was wounded in the leg by flying debris. He refused an order to go below decks and instead remained at his post throughout the battle. For this action, he was awarded the Medal of Honor four months later, on December 31, 1864.

McCullock's official Medal of Honor citation reads:

On board the U.S.S. Lackawanna during successful attacks against Fort Morgan, rebel gunboats and the ram Tennessee in Mobile Bay, on 5 August 1864. Wounded when an enemy shell struck, and ordered to go below, McCullock refused to leave his station and continued to perform his duties throughout the prolonged action which resulted in the capture of the prize ram Tennessee and in the damaging and destruction of Fort Morgan.
