= John C. Donnelly =

American Civil War sailor and Medal of Honor recipient

- Born: 1839; England
- Died: 1895 (aged 55–56)
- Military career
- Allegiance: United States
- Branch: United States Navy
- Rank: Ordinary Seaman
- Unit: USS Metacomet
- Conflicts: American Civil War • Battle of Mobile Bay
- Awards: Medal of Honor

John C. Donnelly (1839–1895) was a Union Navy sailor in the American Civil War and a recipient of the U.S. military's highest decoration, the Medal of Honor, for his actions at the Battle of Mobile Bay.

Born in 1839 in England, Donnelly immigrated to the United States and was living in New York when he joined the U.S. Navy. He served during the Civil War as an ordinary seaman on the USS Metacomet. At the Battle of Mobile Bay on August 5, 1864, he was among the crew of a small boat sent from Metacomet to rescue survivors of the USS Tecumseh, which had been sunk by a naval mine (then known as a "torpedo"). Despite intense fire, the boat crew was able to pull ten Tecumseh men from the water. For this action, Donnelly was awarded the Medal of Honor a year and a half later, on January 15, 1866. Five other members of the boat crew also received the medal: Seaman James Avery, Quarter Gunner Charles Baker, Captain of the Forecastle John Harris, Seaman Henry Johnson, and Landsman Daniel Noble.

Donnelly's official Medal of Honor citation reads:

Served on board the U.S.S. Metacomet. As a member of the boat's crew which went to the rescue of the U.S. Monitor Tecumseh when that vessel was struck by a torpedo in passing the enemy forts in Mobile Bay, 5 August 1864, Donnelly braved the enemy fire which was said by the admiral [ David Farragut ] to be "one of the most galling" he had ever seen and aided in rescuing from death 10 of the crew of the Tecumseh, eliciting the admiration of both friend and foe.

Donnelly died in 1895 at age 55 or 56.
