= Henry Johnson (sailor) =

Union Navy sailor in the American Civil War

- Born: c. 1824; Norway
- Military career
- Allegiance: United States
- Branch: United States Navy
- Rank: Seaman
- Unit: USS Metacomet
- Conflicts: American Civil War • Battle of Mobile Bay
- Awards: Medal of Honor

Henry Johnson (born about 1824, date of death unknown) was a Union Navy sailor in the American Civil War and a recipient of the U.S. military's highest decoration, the Medal of Honor, for his actions at the Battle of Mobile Bay.

Born in about 1824 in Norway, Johnson immigrated to the United States and was living in New York when he joined the Navy in 1857. He served during the Civil War as a seaman on the USS Metacomet. At the Battle of Mobile Bay on August 5, 1864, he was among the crew of a small boat sent from Metacomet to rescue survivors of the USS Tecumseh, which had been sunk by a naval mine (then known as a "torpedo"). Despite intense fire, the boat crew was able to pull ten Tecumseh men from the water. For this action, Johnson was awarded the Medal of Honor three years later, on February 23, 1867. Five other members of the boat crew also received the medal: Seaman James Avery, Quarter Gunner Charles Baker, Ordinary Seaman John C. Donnelly, Captain of the Forecastle John Harris, and Landsman Daniel Noble.

Johnson's official Medal of Honor citation reads:

As seaman on board the U.S.S. Metacomet, Johnson served as a member of the boat's crew which went to the rescue of the U.S. Monitor Tecumseh when that vessel was struck by a torpedo in passing the enemy forts in Mobile Bay, 5 August 1864. He braved the enemy fire which was said by the admiral [ David Farragut ] to be "one of the most galling" he had ever seen, and aided in rescuing from death 10 of the crew of the Tecumseh, thereby eliciting the admiration of both friend and foe.
