= George Taylor (Medal of Honor) =

- Born: November 15, 1830; Watertown, New York
- Died: October 7, 1893 (aged 62)
- Burial place: Paragould, Arkansas
- Military career
- Allegiance: United States
- Branch: United States Navy
- Rank: Armorer
- Unit: USS Lackawanna
- Conflicts: American Civil War • Battle of Mobile Bay
- Awards: Medal of Honor

George Taylor (November 15, 1830 – October 7, 1893) was a Union Navy sailor in the American Civil War and a recipient of the U.S. military's highest decoration, the Medal of Honor, for his actions at the Battle of Mobile Bay.

== Biography ==
Born on November 15, 1830, in Watertown, New York, Taylor was still living in that state when he joined the Navy. He served during the Civil War as an armorer on the USS Lackawanna. At the Battle of Mobile Bay on August 5, 1864, his ship engaged the CSS Tennessee and was struck by a broadside at close range. The Confederate artillery shells hit Lackawanna's berth deck near the magazine, causing mass casualties and igniting loose gunpowder which had spilled onto the floor while Lackawanna's sailors were assembling their own shells. The flames moved along a passageway towards the powder room, where 17 tons of gunpowder were stored. Although he had received a wound to his forehead, Taylor ran towards the fire and extinguished it with his bare hands, thereby saving his ship. He then returned to his duties for the remainder of the battle, despite his hands being burned down to the bone. For this action, he was awarded the Medal of Honor four months later, on December 31, 1864.

Taylor's official Medal of Honor citation reads:

On board the U.S.S. Lackawanna during successful attacks against Fort Morgan, rebel gunboats and the ram Tennessee in Mobile Bay, on 5 August 1864. When an enemy shell exploded in the shellroom, Taylor although wounded went into the room and, with his hand, extinguished the fire from the explosion. He then carried out his duties during the remainder of the prolonged action which resulted in the capture of the prize rebel ram Tennessee and in the damaging and destruction of Fort Morgan.

Taylor died on October 7, 1893, at age 62 and was buried in Paragould, Arkansas.

== See also ==
- List of American Civil War Medal of Honor recipients: T–Z
