= Länsman =

Länsman is a surname.

- Hildá Länsman (born 1993), Sámi singer
- Ulla Pirttijärvi-Länsman, Sami singer
- Vieno Länsman (died 2024), Sámi politician

== See also ==
- Lansman
- Landman (surname)
- Landmann
- Lensmann (fiefholder or later police chief in Nordic countries, in Sweden Länsman)
