= John Smith (Medal of Honor, born 1831) =

- Born: c. 1831; Boston, Massachusetts
- Military career
- Allegiance: United States
- Branch: United States Navy
- Rank: Captain of the Forecastle
- Unit: USS Lackawanna
- Conflicts: American Civil War • Battle of Mobile Bay
- Awards: Medal of Honor

John Smith (born c. 1831, date of death unknown) was a Union Navy sailor in the American Civil War and a recipient of the U.S. military's highest decoration, the Medal of Honor, for his actions at the Battle of Mobile Bay.

Born in about 1831 in Boston, Massachusetts, Smith was still living in that city when he joined the Navy. He served in the war as captain of the forecastle on the USS Lackawanna. During the Battle of Mobile Bay on August 5, 1864, Lackawanna engaged the CSS Tennessee at close range but Smith, acting as a gun captain, found that his ship's artillery could not be aimed low enough to hit the Confederate ironclad. The two ships were so close that a Confederate sailor began shouting insults at Lackawanna's crew; Smith responded by throwing a holystone into one of Tennessee's portholes at him. For his actions during the battle, Smith was awarded the Medal of Honor months later, on December 31, 1864.

Smith's official Medal of Honor citation reads:

On board the U.S.S. Lackawanna during the successful attacks against Fort Morgan, rebel gunboats and the ram Tennessee in Mobile Bay, 5 August 1864. Serving as a gun captain and finding he could not depress his gun when alongside the rebel ironclad Tennessee, Smith threw a hand holystone into one of the ports at a rebel using abusive language against the crew of the ship. He continued his daring action throughout the engagement which resulted in the capture of the prize ram Tennessee and in the damaging and destruction of Fort Morgan.
