= Jeffry Lansman =

American neuroscientist and professor emeritus

Jeffry B. Lansman (born 1951, in Miami Beach, Florida) is an American cellular and molecular physiologist, pharmacologist, and academic. He is Professor Emeritus of Cellular and Molecular Pharmacology in the School of Medicine of the University of California, San Francisco, and is a member of UCSF's Weill Institute for Neurosciences and Cardiovascular Research Institute. He is the founder and chief executive officer of PraecisAi.corp, a precision cardiovascular diagnostics company using advanced AI methods to bring high level cardiovascular care to rural and resource-limited communities globally. He is also the founder and chief scientific officer of Turex Marine BioPharma.

Lansman is known for biophysical research on ion channels in nerve and muscle and their role in disease pathogenesis. As a postdoctoral fellow at Yale School of Medicine with Richard W. Tsien and Peter Hess, he co-authored the defining characterization of the L- and T-type voltage-gated calcium channels in cardiac muscle and determined the mechanism of action of dihydropyridine drugs, used in cardiovascular disease. At UCSF, his laboratory established mechanosensitive ion channels as a driver of pathological calcium loading in Duchenne muscular dystrophy and identified TRPV4 as a molecular component of those channels.

He is a seven-time recipient of the Long Prize Teacher of the Year and the Long Prize for excellence in Teaching at the UCSF School of Pharmacy and a two-time Teacher of the Year of the American Association of Colleges of Pharmacy. From 2013 to 2016 he chaired the University of California system-wide Committee on Privilege and Tenure, the Academic Senate body responsible for faculty grievance and disciplinary adjudication across all ten UC campuses.

== Career ==
=== Academic career ===
Lansman has held extensive academic-governance roles within the University of California. From 2013 to 2016 he served as chair of the system-wide University Committee on Privilege and Tenure, the quasi-judicial body of the UC Academic Senate that oversees faculty grievance and disciplinary adjudication across all ten UC campuses; in that role he led revision of system-wide policy in response to incidents of racial discrimination and sexual harassment and drafted guidelines coordinating divisional hearings with Title VII and Title IX investigations. From 2013 to 2014 he served on UC President Janet Napolitano's Work Group on Discrimination and Bias, an independent task force chaired by former California Supreme Court Justice Carlos R. Moreno. He also chaired the UCSF Academic Senate Committee on Privilege and Tenure (2012–2014) and the UCSF Academic Senate Graduate Council (2007–2009), and served on the system-wide Academic Senate Board on Admissions and Relations with Schools (2003–2005), which sets undergraduate admissions policy for the nine UC undergraduate campuses.

=== Professional career ===
In 2017 Lansman founded Turex Marine BioPharma, where he serves as chief scientific officer; the company explores marine biological sources for small-molecule drug candidates targeting inflammatory and neurodegenerative disease. In 2024 he founded PraecisAi.corp, a precision cardiovascular diagnostics company headquartered in North Carolina, where he serves as founder and chief executive officer. PraecisAi develops platforms for detecting and managing cardiac disease in resource-limited communities without access to advances imaging. The goal of PraecisAI is to reduce the human and economic burden of cardiovascular disease which is now the number one cause of death and disability.

== Scientific contributions ==
Lansman's research has spanned more than four decades and concerns the biophysics of ion channels in nerve and muscle and their role in disease pathogenesis. He is the author of more than 50 peer-reviewed publications, with approximately 8,968 citations and an h-index of 33 as recorded by Google Scholar.

=== Pacemaker current and the cardiac sinoatrial node (UCLA, 1982). ===
Working with Susumu Hagiwara at UCLA, Lansman participated in the early characterization of the hyperpolarization-activated pacemaker current (f) responsible for the spontaneous rhythmic activity of the sinoatrial node.

=== L- and T-type voltage-gated calcium channels (Yale, 1984–1986) ===
With Richard W. Tsien and Peter Hess at Yale School of Medicine, Lansman co-authored the foundational papers characterizing distinct L- and T-type calcium channels in cardiac ventricular myocytes and elucidating the mechanism by which dihydropyridines and beta-adrenergic agonists modulate heart rate and contractility. A subsequent paper provided the first direct measurement of the molecular residence time of a single Ca²⁺ ion within the pore of a calcium channel, providing definitive evidence for the two-site binding model of channel selectivity.

=== Mechanotransduction in vascular endothelium (Cambridge, 1986) ===
As a NATO–NSF postdoctoral fellow at the Physiological Laboratory, University of Cambridge, Lansman identified mechanically-activated ion channels in vascular endothelial cells as a transducer of blood-pressure and shear-flow signals in vascular regulation.

=== Mechanosensitive ion channels and muscular dystrophy (UCSF, 1990–2015) ===
Lansman's UCSF laboratory established mechanosensitive (MS) ion channels as the dominant pathway for pathological Ca²⁺ influx in Duchenne muscular dystrophy. The laboratory showed that MS channels in dystrophic (mdx) muscle remain open for seconds rather than milliseconds, producing the calcium loading that drives muscle-cell death, and subsequently demonstrated that the TRPV4 protein contributes to the molecular identity of these channels linking cytoskeletal defects to TRPV4 gain-of-function in autosomal-dominant skeletal dysplasias, distal spinal muscular atrophy, and hereditary motor neuropathies.

=== Neuronal L-type channels and cerebellar neurodegeneration (UCSF, 1991–2012) ===
Lansman translated his cardiac calcium-channel framework to the central nervous system, using cerebellar granule cells and naturally occurring mouse mutants. His group described functionally distinct populations of neuronal L-type channels, including channels that reopen at negative potentials, and demonstrated that metabotropic glutamate receptors couple L-type channels to ryanodine receptors, revealing an oscillatory Ca²⁺-signaling motif in which store depletion potentiates L-type current.

== Honors and awards ==
Lansman is a seven-time recipient of the Long Prize Teacher of the Year at the UCSF School of Pharmacy (2002, 2004, 2006, 2008, 2011) and a two-time Teacher of the Year of the American Association of Colleges of Pharmacy (2009, 2010). He is a five-time recipient of the Joseph M. Long Foundation Prize for Excellence in Teaching and has received 17 Dean's Recognitions for Excellence in Teaching from the UCSF School of Pharmacy (2006–2015).

Lansman was named the Dunaway-Burnam Visiting Professor of Physiology at Dartmouth Medical School in 1991. He received the Basil O'Connor Scholar Award from the March of Dimes Foundation in 1987 and the Syntex Scholars Achievement Award in Cardiovascular Research in 1986. He was a NATO–NSF Postdoctoral Fellow at the University of Cambridge in 1985.

== Expert consulting practice ==
Lansman maintains an expert consulting practice in civil litigation and class-action matters involving pharmaceutical injury and drug-related death. He is engaged by both plaintiff and defense counsel and provides expert reports, depositions, and trial testimony nationally.

Lansman's practice is built on what he terms multi-level scientific causation analysis: an ordered reconstruction of the chain of events connecting a pharmacological insult at the molecular level to the cellular consequence, the tissue-level disturbance, the organ-system effect, and ultimately the clinical injury or death. He has compared the structure of such an opinion to a National Transportation Safety Board an airline accident investigation, in which the final report identifies a coherent sequence of contributing events rather than a single failure. He argues that this structure has become particularly important under the 2023 amendment to Federal Rule of Evidence 702, which requires that an expert's reasoning be reliable at every step rather than only at the conclusion.

The methodological foundation for this approach derives from Lansman's three decades of teaching at UCSF, where he served as course director of curricula in autonomic and cardiovascular pharmacology, immuno- and endocrine pharmacology, and neuropharmacology, and as director of the core first-year cellular and molecular neuroscience course in the UCSF Neuroscience Graduate Program.

In his consulting practice include pharmacology and pharmacokinetics; cardiovascular and renal pharmacology; neuropharmacology and drugs of abuse; multi-organ system interactions and cross-system drug effects; polypharmacy and drug–drug interactions; adverse drug events and medication errors; drug-induced cardiac arrhythmia and QT prolongation; central-nervous-system drug effects on cognition, motor function, behavior, and capacity to give informed consent; Bradford Hill criteria; and differential etiology in scientific causation.
