= Louis G. Chaput =

- Born: August 23, 1847; Montreal, Canada East
- Died: April 17, 1916 (aged 68)
- Military career
- Allegiance: United States
- Branch: United States Navy
- Rank: Landsman
- Unit: USS Lackawanna
- Conflicts: American Civil War • Battle of Mobile Bay
- Awards: Medal of Honor

Louis G. Chaput (August 23, 1847 — April 17, 1916) was a Union Navy sailor in the American Civil War and a recipient of the U.S. military's highest decoration, the Medal of Honor, for his actions at the Battle of Mobile Bay.

Born in 1847 in Montreal, Chaput immigrated to the United States and was living in New York when he joined the U.S. Navy. He served during the Civil War as a landsman on the USS Lackawanna. At the Battle of Mobile Bay on August 5, 1864, Lackawanna engaged the CSS Tennessee at close range and Chaput was severely wounded in the face and limbs by flying debris while manning an artillery gun. After receiving medical treatment, he returned to his post and continued working the gun for the remainder of the battle. For this action, he was awarded the Medal of Honor four months later, on December 31, 1864.

Chaput's official Medal of Honor citation reads:

On board the U.S.S. Lackawanna during successful attacks against Fort Morgan, rebel gunboats and the rebel ram Tennessee in Mobile Bay, 5 August 1864. Severely wounded, Chaput remained at his gun until relieved, reported to the surgeon and returned to his gun until the action was over. He was then carried below following the action which resulted in the capture of the prize ram Tennessee and in destruction of batteries at Fort Morgan.

Chaput died on April 17, 1916, at age 68.
