= USS Metacomet (1863) =

Gunboat of the United States Navy

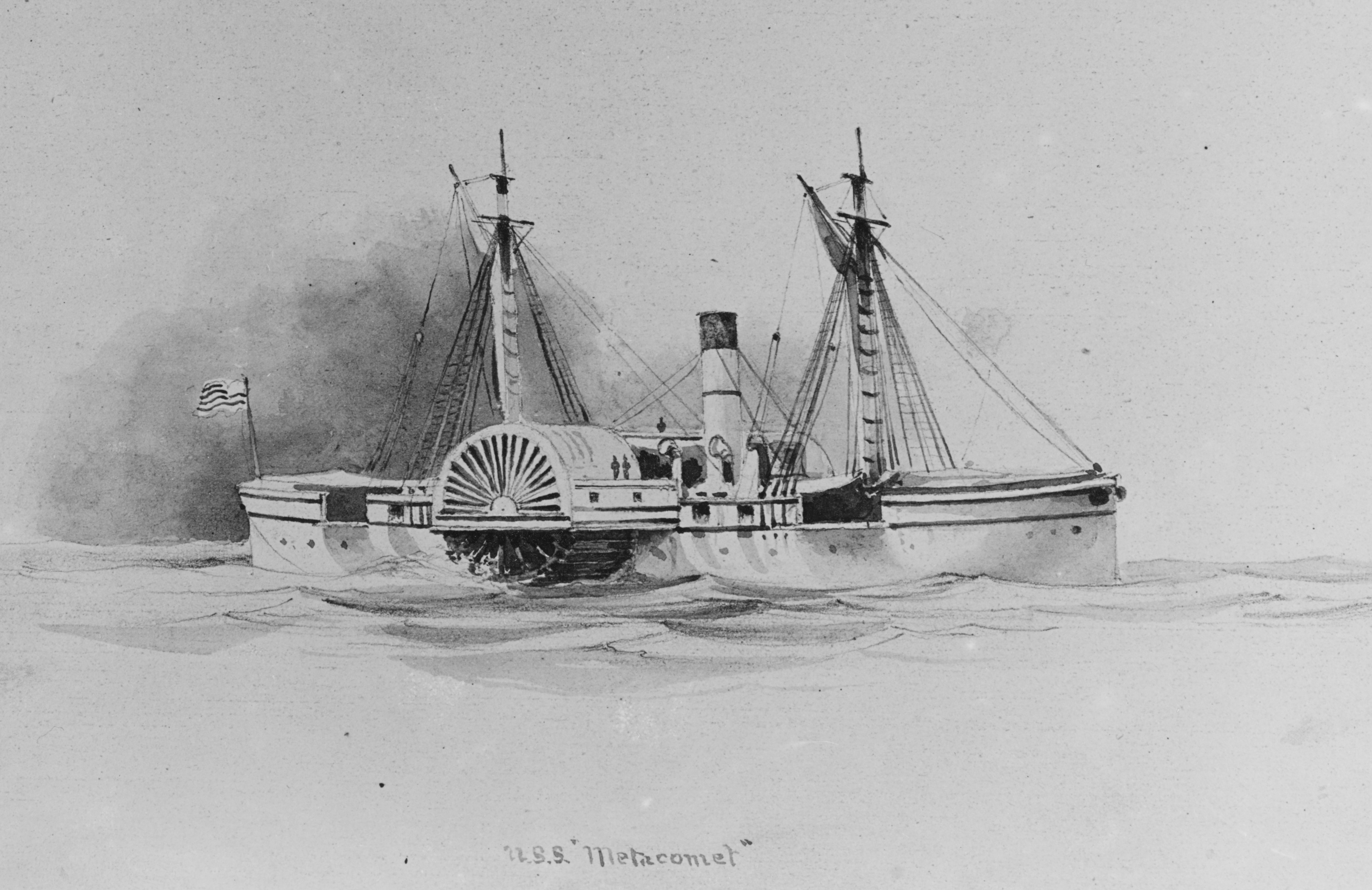
- USS Metacomet

History

United States
- Name: USS Metacomet
- Builder: Thomas Stack, Brooklyn, New York
- Launched: 7 March 1863
- Commissioned: 4 January 1864
- Decommissioned: 18 August 1865
- Fate: Sold, 28 October 1865

General characteristics
- Class & type: Sassacus-class gunboat
- Displacement: 1,173 long tons (1,192 t)
- Length: 205 ft (62 m)
- Beam: 35 ft (11 m)
- Draft: 8 ft 6 in (2.59 m)
- Propulsion: Steam engine
- Speed: 12.5 kn (14.4 mph; 23.2 km/h)
- Armament: 2 × 100-pounder guns, 2 × 24-pounder guns, 1 × 12-pounder gun, 4 × 9-pounder guns

The second USS Metacomet was a wooden sidewheel steamer in the United States Navy during the American Civil War. The ship was named for Metacomet, a war chief of the Wampanoag Indians.

Metacomet was launched on 7 March 1863 by Thomas Stack, Brooklyn, New York, and commissioned at New York on 4 January 1864 under the captaincy of Commander James E. Jouett.

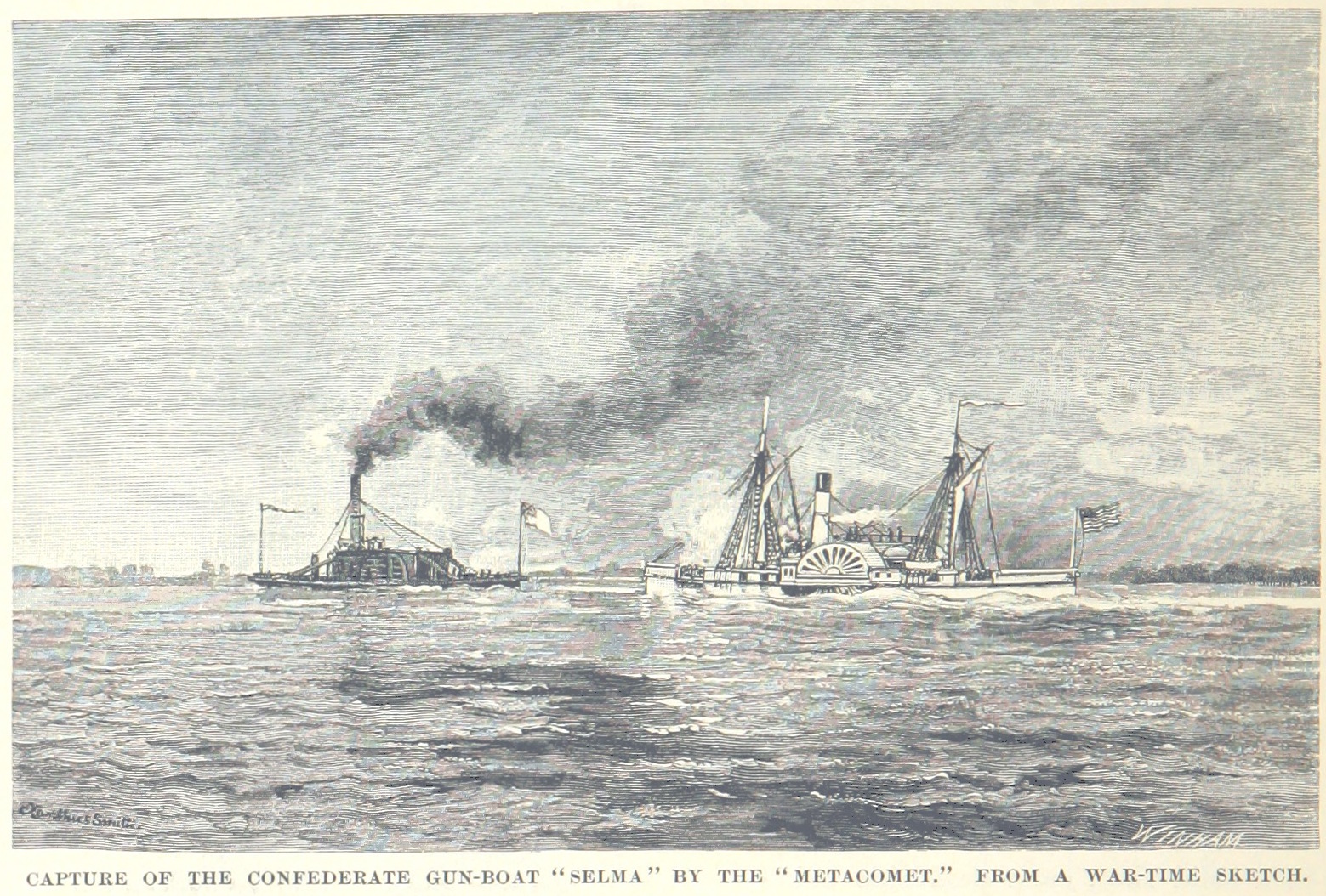
The USS Metacomet captures CSS Selma in the Battle of Mobile Bay.

== Civil War ==
Metacomet joined the West Gulf Blockading Squadron in the blockade of Mobile Bay and captured British blockade runner Donegal on 6 June. On the 30th, Glasgow forced blockade runner Ivanhoe ashore near Fort Morgan, whose guns protected the ship from destruction by the Union. Unsuccessful in efforts to destroy her by long-range fire from Metacomet and Monongahela, Admiral David Farragut ordered a boat expedition to attempt the task. Under cover of darkness, boats from Metacomet and Kennebec slipped in close to shore and burned the steamer.

Metacomet and 17 other ships entered Mobile Bay in a double column on 5 August 1864. In the ensuing battle Metacomet and other Union ships captured Confederate ram CSS Tennessee, a major threat to the blockaders at Mobile. Farragut's ships maintained a heavy fire on Fort Morgan and Confederate gunboats, capturing CSS Selma. Metacomet then rescued survivors from Union monitor Tecumseh, sunk by a Confederate torpedo. Six Metacomet sailors were awarded the Medal of Honor for helping rescue the crew of the Tecumseh: Seaman James Avery, Quarter Gunner Charles Baker, Ordinary Seaman John C. Donnelly, Captain of the Forecastle John Harris, Seaman Henry Johnson, and Landsman Daniel Noble. A further two sailors, Boatswain's Mate Patrick Murphy and Coxswain Thomas Taylor, were awarded the medal for their conduct during the battle. After the battle, all Confederate and Union wounded were transferred to Metacomet, which was then allowed to leave for the U.S. Naval Hospital in Pensacola after passing Fort Morgan under a flag of truce.

After offloading the wounded, Metacomet steamed to the Texas coast and captured blockade runner Susanna off Campechy Banks on 28 November, and took schooner Sea Witch and sloop Lilly off Galveston on 31 December 1864 and 6 January 1865, respectively.

Mines, then called "torpedoes", remained a danger to shipping in waters near Mobile, so Metacomet returned there to drag the Bay and Blakely Channel from 9 March-12 April. Returning north after the end of the conflict, Metacomet decommissioned at Philadelphia on 18 August and was sold there to John Roach & Sons on 28 October.
