= John M. Burns (sailor) =

- Civil War era Navy Medal of Honor
- Born: 1835; Hudson, New York
- Died: September 9, 1864 (aged 28–29); Pensacola Naval Hospital; Pensacola, Florida
- Military career
- Allegiance: United States
- Branch: United States Navy
- Rank: Seaman
- Unit: USS Lackawanna
- Conflicts: American Civil War • Battle of Mobile Bay
- Awards: Medal of Honor

John M. Burns (1835 – September 9, 1864) was a Union Navy sailor in the American Civil War and a recipient of the U.S. military's highest decoration, the Medal of Honor, for his actions at the Battle of Mobile Bay.

== Biography ==
Born in 1835 in Hudson, New York, Burns was still living in that state when he joined the Navy. He served during the Civil War as a seaman on the USS Lackawanna. At the Battle of Mobile Bay on August 5, 1864, Lackawanna engaged the CSS Tennessee at close range and Burns was severely wounded in the arm and back by flying debris. After receiving medical attention, he returned to his post and helped supply gunpowder to Lackawanna's artillery pieces for the remainder of the battle. For this action, he was awarded the Medal of Honor four months later, on December 31, 1864.

Burns's official Medal of Honor citation reads:

On board the U.S.S. Lackawanna during successful attacks against Fort Morgan, rebel gunboats and the ram Tennessee in Mobile Bay, on 5 August 1864. Although severely wounded and sent below under the surgeon's charge, Burns promptly returned to his station and assisted the powder division throughout the prolonged action which resulted in the capture of the rebel ram Tennessee and in the damaging and destruction of Fort Morgan.
