= Daniel Whitfield =

- Born: c. 1821; Newark, New Jersey
- Military career
- Allegiance: United States
- Branch: United States Navy
- Rank: Quartermaster
- Unit: USS Lackawanna
- Conflicts: American Civil War • Battle of Mobile Bay
- Awards: Medal of Honor

Daniel Whitfield (born c. 1821, date of death unknown) was a Union Navy sailor in the American Civil War and a recipient of the U.S. military's highest decoration, the Medal of Honor, for his actions at the Battle of Mobile Bay.

Born in about 1821 in Newark, New Jersey, Whitfield was still living in that city when he joined the Navy. He served during the Civil War as a quartermaster and gun captain on the USS Lackawanna. At the Battle of Mobile Bay on August 5, 1864, he "courageously carried out his duties" as Lackawanna engaged the CSS Tennessee at close range, including waiting until his ship came alongside Tennessee and then firing his gun (by use of a lock-string) into the Confederate ironclad. For this action, he was awarded the Medal of Honor four months later, on December 31, 1864.

Whitfield's official Medal of Honor citation reads:

Serving as quartermaster on board the U.S.S. Lackawanna during successful attacks against Fort Morgan, rebel gunboats and the rebel ram Tennessee in Mobile Bay, August 5, 1864. Acting as captain of a gun, Whitfield coolly stood by his gun, holding on to the lock string and waited alongside the rebel ram Tennessee until able to fire the shot that entered her port. Whitfield courageously carried out his duties during the prolonged action which resulted in the capture of the prize ram Tennessee and in the damaging and destruction of Fort Morgan.
