= Susan Rothstein =

British-Israeli linguist (1958–2019)

- סוזן רוטשטיין
- Born: 20 August 1958; London, United Kingdom
- Died: 30 July 2019 (aged 60); Tel Aviv, Israel
- Spouse: Fred Landman

Academic background
- Education: Oxford University (BA); Massachusetts Institute of Technology (PhD)
- Thesis: The Syntactic Forms of Predication (1983)

Academic work
- Discipline: Linguist
- Sub-discipline: Semantics
- Institutions: Bar-Ilan University

Susan Rothstein (Hebrew: סוזן רוטשטיין; 20 August 1958 – 30 July 2019) was a British-Israeli linguist and Professor of Theoretical Linguistics at Bar-Ilan University, Israel. She was a semanticist who was best known for her work on the semantics of aspect and the mass/count distinction.

== Career ==
Rothstein earned her bachelor's degree with Honors in 1979 from the School of Philosophy and Modern Languages at Oxford University. She earned her PhD at MIT, where she studied Linguistics and Philosophy, completing a dissertation in 1983 on ''The Syntactic Forms of Predication'' which was published by the Indiana University Linguistics Club.

From 1983 to 1985, Rothstein held a position as assistant professor of linguistics at the College of William and Mary (US), before joining the Bar-Ilan University faculty with an Alon Fellowship in 1985. At Bar-Ilan she was Professor of Theoretical Linguistics in the Department of English Literature and Linguistics and a Fellow in the Gonda (Goldschmied) Multidisciplinary Brain Research Center.

From 1994 until her death, she was married to fellow linguist Fred Landman, with whom she had one daughter. They occasionally co-authored studies.

== Awards and distinctions ==
Awards and distinctions:

- 1985 Alon (Israeli Government) Fellowship for outstanding new faculty
- 2013 Member of the Academia Europaea
- 2014 Humboldt Research Award

== Selected publications ==
Susan Rothstein. 2004. The Syntactic Forms of Predication. In: Predicates and Their Subjects. Studies in Linguistics and Philosophy, vol 74. Springer, Dordrecht.

Susan Rothstein. 2008. Structuring Events: A Study in the Semantics of Lexical Aspect. ISBN 9781405106672

Susan Rothstein. 2010. Counting and the mass/count distinction. Journal of Semantics 27, 343–397.
