= Ludwig Andreas Olsen =

United States Navy Medal of Honor recipient

- Ludwig Andreas Olsen's gravestone in Cypress Hills National Cemetery, Section 6, Grave 12616.
- Born: 1845; Oslo, Norway
- Died: February 20, 1886 (aged 40–41)
- Burial place: Cypress Hills National Cemetery
- Military career
- Allegiance: United States of America
- Branch: U.S. Navy
- Service years: 1870–1886
- Rank: Captain of the Hold
- Nickname: Louis Williams
- Unit: USS Lackawanna
- Awards: Medal of Honor (2)

Ludwig Andreas Olsen (1845 – February 20, 1886), also known as Louis Williams, was a United States Navy sailor and one of only 19 people to ever be awarded two Medals of Honor. Both awards were for non-combat actions rescuing fellow seamen.

== Biography ==
Olsen was born in Oslo, Norway, in 1845. He joined the Navy from California in 1870, under the name Louis Williams. He eventually achieved the rank of Captain of the Hold, an enlisted position that placed him in charge of keeping order in the ship's hold.

On 16 March 1883, aboard the screw sloop-of-war USS Lackawanna off Honolulu, Hawaii, Olsen jumped overboard and saved a fellow sailor from drowning. The next year, on 13 June 1884 off the coast of Callao, Peru, Olsen again saved a man from drowning, along with Ordinary Seaman Isaac L. Fasseur. For each of these peace-time actions he was awarded a Medal of Honor; Fasseuer also received the medal for the 1884 rescue. Both medals were presented to Olsen on 18 October 1884, making him one of only 19 people to receive two Medals of Honor and one of only 14 people to receive two Medals of Honor for two separate acts. Both medals were awarded under the name he had enlisted with, Louis Williams.

Olsen's awards were for peace-time actions; it can be argued that today he would be awarded the Navy and Marine Corps Medal.

Olsen died on 20 February 1886 and is buried in Cypress Hills National Cemetery, Section 6, Grave 12616, in Brooklyn, New York City, New York.

== Medal of Honor citations ==
First Citation:

For jumping overboard from the U.S.S. Lackawanna, 16 March 1883, at Honolulu, Territory of Hawaii, and rescuing from drowning Thomas Moran, landsman.

Second Citation:

Serving on board the U.S.S. Lackawanna, Williams rescued from drowning William Cruise, who had fallen overboard at Callao, Peru, 13 June 1884.

== See also ==
- List of Medal of Honor recipients in non-combat incidents
