= Valentin Landmann =

Swiss criminal defense attorney

Valentin Landmann (born June 7, 1950, in St. Gallen) is a Swiss criminal defense lawyer, author, media personality and former politician. A public figure, he is known for his work defending people in the Swiss 'criminal underworld'. He has represented politicians, sex workers, accused spies, members of the Hells Angels and neo-Nazi activists.

== Biography ==
Valentin Landmann was born and grew up in St. Gallen. He is the son of the philosopher Michael Landmann and the writer Salcia Landmann. His parents are of Jewish descent.

He received his law degrees from the University of Zurich and his license to practice in 1977.

== Career ==
Apart from his role as a criminal defense lawyer, Valentin Landmann has also served as a regional politician (member of the Zurich Cantonal Parliament for the Swiss People's Party) and as a lecturer at the University of Lucerne. He is also a frequently cited commentator on legal and criminal issues.

=== Commentator ===
He strongly supports Switzerland's liberal prostitution policies, including opposing a 2015 initiative to go beyond banning the purchase of sexual services from 16 and 17-year olds, but also criminalizing the sale of sex (by prostitutes) to this age group. Prior to 2015, Switzerland had aligned the minimum ages for selling and buying sex with its general age of consent of 16. He opposes Switzerland criminalizing the purchase of sex as envisioned by the Nordic model of prostitution law.

In June 2020, Landmann was featured in the Swiss weekly magazine Schweizer Illustrierte visiting a brothel after it was reopened following the COVID-19 lockdown. In the magazine, Landmann was quoted as saying that the closure of Swiss brothels was "an incredible brutality towards all sex workers, a crime". He also said that he agreed with feminists that the closure had caused many sex workers to suffer existential hardship. Some 50 members of the cantonal parliament of Zurich signed a letter to the magazine's publisher criticizing the way the article portrayed prostitution. The letter also accused the magazine of violating basic journalistic standards by advertising one of Switzerland's largest brothels and promoting Landmann. Landmann defended his actions, saying that he was proud to support sex workers and that he was not a pimp. He also said that he stood by his comments about feminists.

Landmann supports the legalization of marihuana, putting him at odds with many of his fellow Swiss People's Party members.

He has mentioned his concerns over a worsening of Switzerland's stance on neutrality. He criticizes what he perceives as a loss of Swiss neutrality due to the country's involvement in economic sanctions against Russia after the 2022 invasion of Ukraine. Landmann advocates for embedding stronger neutrality provisions in the Swiss constitution.

=== Lawyer ===
Landmann initially worked as a lawyer for Zürich firm Wenger und Vieli dealing with business and economic law. He opened his own practice devoted to criminal law in 1984.

In 2012, Landmann represented right-wing politician and attorney Hermann Lei who had leaked data to the media belonging to then Swiss National Bank Chairman Philipp Hildebrand, leading to the latter's eventual resignation.

In 2012, a journalist from the newspaper Aargauer Zeitung, noted that Landmann's "high level of popularity is the result of years of media presence and a penchant for self-promotion".

In 2014, Landmann represented media entrepreneur and lobbyist Sacha Wigdorovits who was charged with attempted coercion and unlawfully leaking confidential chat transcripts that implicated Swiss MP and pro-Palestinian activist Geri Müller in participating in the distribution of sexual chats and nude selfies of himself.

=== Politician ===
In 2019 Landmann was elected to the Cantonal Council of Zurich as a member of the right-wing Swiss People's Party. He lost re-election in 2023.

As a member of the Cantonal Council, Landmann in early 2022 advocated for the right of Ukrainian refugees fleeing the Russian invasion of Ukraine, to work as sex workers in the Canton of Zurich after reports emerged that the cantonal government was not giving them the necessary permits for fear of abuse and exploitation.

During a September 2020 Zurich cantonal council session, Landmann sparked controversy with a comment directed at Green Liberal Party councilor Andrea Gisler, who had questioned the feasibility of COVID-safe practices in the sex industry. Landmann humorously offered to explain to her in detail how protective equipment could be incorporated into sexual practices, stating, “There’s more to it than lying on top of each other and rubbing heads.” The remark drew mixed reactions, with some finding it amusing and others, including Gisler, deeming it inappropriate. Landmann later clarified that, though intended as a joke, his comment was informed by serious discussions with industry contacts about viable safety protocols. He apologized to Gisler, who accepted, though she remained dissatisfied with council president Roman Schmid’s lack of intervention. Landmann also criticized a recent policy restricting work permits for EU/EFTA nationals in the sex industry, arguing it forces workers into illegal sectors, and he announced plans for legal action against the policy.

== Personal life ==
Landmann is friends with various prominent Swiss politicians such as Christoph Blocher and Daniel Jositsch.

In 2012, the Zurich District Court sentenced a 39-year-old woman to an unconditional prison sentence of 12 months for threatening, stalking and attempting to coerce Landmann. The woman had previously lost a court case against a fortuneteller represented by Landmann.

Though born to Jewish parents, Landmann converted to Protestant Christianity (Swiss Reformed) before eventually quitting the church. In a 2012 article, Landmann was described as "still Protestant" despite his formal exit from the church.

In 2017, Austrian journalist Manfred Schlapp published a biography of Landmann titled "Valentin Landmann und die Panzerknacker".

== Homepage ==
- valentin-landmann.ch
