= Sacha Wigdorovits =

Swiss journalist, consultant, entrepreneur and lobbyist

- Born: May 23, 1952 (age 74)
- Education: University of Zurich
- Occupations: Journalist, entrepreneur, lobbyist
- Known for: Founder of Contract Media AG, publisher of .ch, involvement with 20 Minutes and various PR activities
- Partner: Ingrid Deltenre

Sacha Wigdorovits (born May 23, 1952) is a Swiss journalist, entrepreneur and lobbyist.

== Life ==
Born to Jewish parents, Sacha Wigdorovits graduated from the University of Zurich.

He then worked as a journalist, among others at the Tages-Anzeiger, then at the SonntagsZeitung – first as chief reporter and then as US correspondent in New York City. After his return, he first worked as deputy editor-in-chief at the Luzerner Neusten Nachrichten (LNN) and developed various newspaper projects for Ringier, before moving to Ringier-owned Blick in 1995, first as sports director and then as editor-in-chief. He remained there until 1997. He then returned to the United States on behalf of Ringier to observe developments in the Internet sector and to complete an Advanced Management Program (AMP) at Harvard Business School. After returning to Switzerland, he founded the communications agency Contract Media AG in August 1998. Contract Media is based in Zollikon as of 2019. One of his first mandates was crisis communication in connection with the crash of Swissair flight 111 near Halifax. A short time later, the Scandinavian media company Schibsted entrusted him with the market research and project management for the founding of the free newspaper 20 Minutes. He launched the newspaper in December 1999 and was a member of the board of directors and investor until it was sold to the media company Tamedia in 2003.

From September 2007 to October 2008, Sacha Wigdorovits was the publisher of the free newspaper .ch. Clients of his communications agency Contract Media include the energy group Axpo, the watch manufacturer Hublot, the hearing aid manufacturer Sonova, the sports retailer Intersport, Media Saturn Switzerland, the Falcon Private Bank and the private bank BSI, as well as the former Chairman of the Board of Directors of UBS, Peter Kurer, following his resignation as Chairman of the Board of Directors. Until 2016 Wigdorovits was involved with the Audiatur Foundation, which, according to its own statements, advocates "balanced reporting on Israel", though some commentators and sources have deemed it pro-Israel or engaging in "Israel advocacy". After the October 7, 2023, Hamas terror attack in Israel Wigdorovits founded the independent, non-profit website fokusisrael.ch to give an in-depth view of the Palestinian Israeli conflict, defend Israel’s right of existence and fight antisemitism. The project, which is also active on Facebook, Instagram, Linkedin and X, features interviews with prominent Israeli, Palestinian and European political experts such as Einat Wilf, Mosab Hassan Yousef aka The Green Prince and Henrik M. Broder as well as political research, articles and commentaries by the editorial staff. FokusIsrael is published in German, English, French and Italian. Based on the initiative of fokusisrael.ch, in December 2025 Switzerland’s two largest telecommunication companies, Swisscom and Sunrise, decided to take Qatar-based news channel Al Jazeera Arabic off their tv cable networks because of its ties with the terror group Hamas.

He is partnered with Dutch-Swiss business executive Ingrid Deltenre.

In 2016, Wigdorovits praised Angela Merkel's communication style in an interview given to German magazine Focus in response to the New Years Eve Cologne riots.

=== Views ===
Wigdorovits holds strong pro-Israel views, believes there is currently no Palestinian partner for peace, but is an opponent of Benjamin Netanyahu and the Likud party and has criticized the proposed Israeli Judicial Reform, as he discussed in an opinion piece in the Swiss daily Neue Zürcher Zeitung in late 2023 after the October 7 Attacks. He opposes the expansion of Israeli settlements in the West Bank and took a stand against his native Switzerland voting for the recognition of Palestine as a UN non-member observer state by the United Nations General Assembly in 2011.

=== Controversies ===
Wigdorovits was called the "most controversial PR-consultant in all of Switzerland" in a 2014 Tages-Anzeiger article profiling him in-depth. Another article by Central Swiss outlet Zentralplus stated that, as part of his PR-Consulting business, Wigdorovits was meticulously involved in shaping the day to day image of his clients.

==== Work as a journalist ====
Wigdorovits came up with numerous striking headlines during his work as the editor-in-chief of Blick. In the mid to late 1990s, he guided Blick's sports reporting to be highly critical of then Swiss national football team coach Artur Jorge. One Blick headline, from 29 May 1996, read "Jetzt spinnt er!" (English: "Now he's crazy!") shortly after Jorge had suffered a brain aneurysm. The headline was used for a story about Jorge's decision to remove Swiss football player fan favorites Alain Sutter and Adrian Knup from the Swiss national squad, though several Swiss sports journalists had claimed a link between Jorge's recently suffered head aneurysm and the headline. After Jorge's passing in 2024, Wigdorovits denied any connection between the latter's head injury and the subsequent headline in an interview. In the same interview he called the media outlets that had criticized him in 1996 "hypocritical" for having received attention by covering Blick's headline, as opposed to through their own coverage of Jorge and the team.

==== Lobbying on behalf of Carl Hirschmann ====
Wigdorovits made headlines in Switzerland in November 2009 when he became an advisor to Swiss nightclub owner and billionaire heir Carl Hirschmann who had been accused of various sex crimes, some involving underage girls.

==== Convicted of unlawfully leaking confidential chat transcripts ====
Internationally, and at home, Wigdorovits was the subject of media coverage at the end of August 2014, when he was described by various media as the mastermind of a campaign against pro-Palestinian Swiss local politician and former Green Party member of parliament Geri Müller. This campaign ultimately led to Müller's temporary suspension as mayor of Baden due to the distribution of nude photos of himself, stemming from an online chat with a 33-year old woman. Swiss daily Basler Zeitung wrote an article criticizing Wigdorovits' role titled The Crisis Specialist Has Failed. The Luzerner Zeitung described Wigdorovits' actions in response to Gerigate, as the scandal was called by the Swiss press, as unusually error-prone and reported that he denied involvement but then partially retracted his denials when confronted with chat transcripts of the woman who successfully solicited nude photos from Müller. In 2019, he was acquitted of the main charge of attempted coercion and aiding and abetting coercion, but was sentenced to a suspended fine of 40 daily rates of 560 Swiss francs (totalling 22,400 Swiss francs) with regard to the retention and unauthorized disclosure of private conversations.

Wigdorovits was represented by prominent attorney Valentin Landmann during the proceedings.

==== Role in firing of journalist ====
In 2022, Wigdorovits was described by some media outlets as responsible for the dismissal of Tages-Anzeiger journalist Kevin Brühlmann by advocating for his firing. The dismissal followed Brühlmann's article, in which he portrayed a Jewish candidate for Zurich's city council, Sonja Rueff-Frenkel, invoking apparent anti-Semitic stereotypes. In response to Brühlmann's apology, well-known Jewish personalities in Zurich, such as former federal judge Vera Rottenberg, wrote a letter that they sent to the publishers and the management of Tamedia (which owns the newspaper). They expressed their gratitude for the statement of the Tages-Anzeiger and the apology of the journalist Kevin Brühlmann. However, the dismissal of Brühlmann was "inappropriate and even counterproductive". Wigdorovits' alleged intervention was questioned by Swiss online news/commentary portal Zackbum.ch where it was stated that he turned "the completely justified criticism of this unsuccessful and embarrassing article [by Brühlmann] into nonsense."

==== Conflict with board of Swiss football club ====
Since 2023, Wigdorovits has lobbied on behalf of and aided the external communications of Swiss businessman and disputed shareholder of FC Luzern Bernhard Alpstaeg in the latter's bid to retain a shareholding majority in the club. Alpstaeg sued his fellow members of the board because they sought to remove half of his 52% shareholdings in the club based on their allegations he had acquired them wrongfully. The public prosecutor's office of the Canton of Lucerne, announced on 2 May 2024 that it will issue an indictment against Bernhard Alpstaeg for coercion and attempted disloyal business management, related to his share purchases. Wigdorovits frequently represented Alpstaeg in front of the media and during press conference. He suggested, at one point, Stefan Wolf, the Chairman of the board of the football club had offered his resignation in exchange for Alpstaeg's continued financial support and voluntary relinquishment of half of his shares, in a move that was widely seen as tactical by the local media. Stefan Wolf denied ever having offered his resignation. On July 1st, Bernhard Alpstaeg announced he would withdraw a separate lawsuit in which he accused Wolf and other Board members of deliberate mismanagement, meaning the Swiss Supreme Court will not review it, and a final evaluation has been made (whereby a regional court ruled in favor of the FC Lucerne board). Wigdorovits told outlet Zentralplus that, from the beginning, Alpstaeg lacked the right to sue in this in case, and therefore failed due to procedural hurdles, not based on the merits (or lack thereof) of his case. This was disputed as factually incorrect by counsel for defendant FC Lucerne board members who then questioned why Alpstaeg sued in the first place.
