= Daniel Noble (Medal of Honor) =

- Born: 1838; Breathitt County, Kentucky
- Died: 1903 (aged 64–65); Wolfe County, Kentucky
- Burial place: Childers Cemetery, Gilmore, Wolfe County, Kentucky
- Military career
- Allegiance: United States
- Branch: United States Navy
- Service years: 1863 - 1865
- Rank: Landsman
- Unit: (United States Navy) USS Metacomet
- Conflicts: American Civil War • Battle of Mobile Bay
- Awards: Medal of Honor

Daniel Noble (1838–1903) was a Confederate prisoner at Camp Douglas before becoming a Union Navy sailor in the American Civil War and a recipient of the U.S. military's highest decoration, the Medal of Honor, for his actions at the Battle of Mobile Bay.

== Background ==
Born in 1838 in Breathitt County, Kentucky, Noble was a Confederate prisoner of war at Camp Douglas, Illinois when he joined the Navy. He served during the Civil War as a landsman on the USS Metacomet. At the Battle of Mobile Bay on August 5, 1864, he was among the crew of a small boat sent from Metacomet to rescue survivors of the USS Tecumseh, which had been sunk by a naval mine (then known as a "torpedo"). Despite intense fire, the boat crew was able to pull ten Tecumseh men from the water. For this action, Noble was awarded the Medal of Honor a year and a half later, on January 15, 1866. Five other members of the boat crew also received the medal: Seaman James Avery, Quarter Gunner Charles Baker, Ordinary Seaman John C. Donnelly, Captain of the Forecastle John Harris, and Seaman Henry Johnson.

== Citation ==
Noble's official Medal of Honor citation reads:

As landsman on board the U.S.S. Metacomet, Noble served among the boat's crew which went to the rescue of the U.S. Monitor Tecumseh when that vessel was struck by a torpedo in passing enemy forts in Mobile Bay, 5 August 1864. Noble braved the enemy fire which was said by the admiral [ David Farragut ] to be "one of the most galling" he had ever seen and aided in rescuing from death 10 of the crew of the Tecumseh, thereby eliciting the admiration of both friend and foe.
