= Isaac L. Fasseur =

US Navy sailor

Isaac Laurens Fasseur
- Born: December 13, 1859; Flushing, Netherlands
- Died: Unknown
- Military career
- Allegiance: United States of America
- Branch: United States Navy
- Rank: Ordinary Seaman
- Unit: USS Lackawanna
- Awards: Medal of Honor

Isaac Laurens Fasseur (1859 – after 1900) was a United States Navy sailor and a recipient of the United States military's highest decoration, the Medal of Honor.

== Biography ==
Born in 1859 in Flushing, Netherlands to Elisabeth Odem and the sailor Isaac Fasseur. Fasseur was living in Valparaíso, Chile, when he joined the U.S. Navy. By June 13, 1884, he was serving as an ordinary seaman on the USS Lackawanna. On that day, while Lackawanna was at Callao, Peru, William Cruise fell overboard and was rescued by Fasseur and another sailor, Captain of the Hold Louis Williams. For this action, both Fasseur and Williams were awarded the Medal of Honor.

Fasseur's official Medal of Honor citation reads:

Serving on board the U.S.S. Lackawanna, 13 June 1884, at Callao, Peru, Fasseur rescued William Cruise, who had fallen overboard, from drowning.

== Later life ==
In April 1885, Fasseur was honorably discharged from the Navy as ships tailor. He married in 1889 in Rotterdam with Maria Valke, but the couple divorced in 1897. In the 1900 United States Census, Fasseur was again in the US Navy, aboard the cruiser USS Philadelphia that was moored in Bremerton, Washington, giving as his home address the Mare Island Naval Shipyard in Vallejo, California.

His date of death and place of burial are unknown.

== See also ==
- List of Medal of Honor recipients during peacetime
