= William Phinney =

United States Navy sailor and Medal of Honor recipient (born 1824)

- Born: c. 1824; Norway
- Military career
- Allegiance: United States
- Branch: United States Navy
- Rank: Boatswain's Mate
- Unit: USS Lackawanna
- Conflicts: American Civil War: Battle of Mobile Bay
- Awards: Medal of Honor

William Phinney (born c. 1824, date of death unknown) was a Union Navy sailor in the American Civil War and a recipient of the U.S. military's highest decoration, the Medal of Honor, for his actions at the Battle of Mobile Bay.

== Background ==
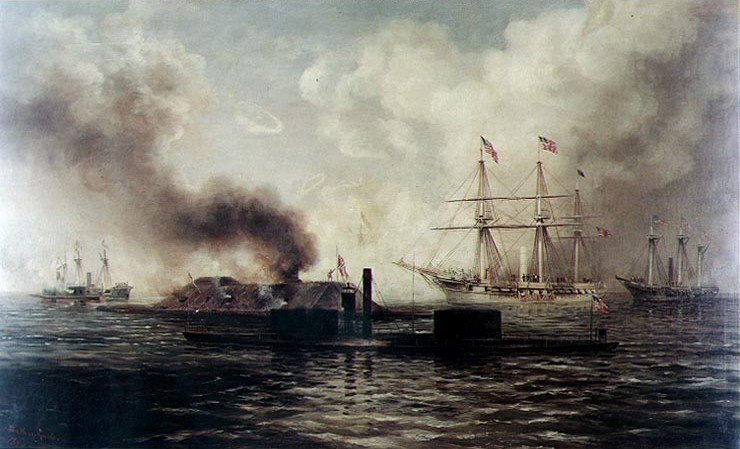
CSS Tennessee under heavy attack during the Battle of Mobile Bay

Born in 1824 in Norway, Phinney immigrated to the United States and was living in New York when he joined the Navy in 1848. He served during the Civil War as a boatswain's mate on the USS Lackawanna. At the Battle of Mobile Bay on August 5, 1864, Lackawanna engaged the CSS Tennessee at close range and Phinney distinguished himself as captain of an artillery gun. Four months later, on December 31, 1864, he was awarded the Medal of Honor in recognition of his actions in battle.

== Official Citation ==
Phinney's official Medal of Honor citation reads:

On board the U.S.S. Lackawanna during successful attacks against Fort Morgan, rebel gunboats and the ram, Tennessee in Mobile Bay, 5 August 1864. Serving as a gun captain Phinney showed much presence of mind in managing the gun, and gave much needed encouragement to the crew during the engagement which resulted in the capture of the prize rebel ram Tennessee and in the damaging and destruction of Fort Morgan.

== Later life ==
Phinney remained in the Navy after the Civil War. He was in the Navy as late as November 16, 1874 when he held the rank of Quarter Gunner and was admitted to the naval hospital at the Brooklyn Navy Yard for adynamia. He was discharged from the Navy two days later on November 18, 1874, for "injuries received in the performance of duty".
