= Publisuisse =

Swiss media distribution company

Publisuisse SA
- Formerly: AG für das Werbefernsehen (1964-1994)
- Industry: media
- Founded: 1964; 62 years ago in Bern, Switzerland
- Defunct: 2016
- Fate: Integrated by Admeira
- Headquarters: Bern, Switzerland
- Key people: Martin Schneider (CEO), Gilles Marchand (chairman of the board)
- Owner: SRG SSR
- Website: www.publisuisse.ch

Publisuisse SA, known until 1994 as AG für das Werbefernsehen (AGW), was the leading electronic media distribution company in Switzerland. It was the commercial partner of SRG SSR and exclusively marketed its publishing offerings. With these electronic media products, Publisuisse offered the Swiss advertising industry opportunities in the areas of traditional television advertising, television and radio sponsorship, teletext advertising, and cross-cutting communication.

== Background ==
In 2016, it was integrated into Admeira, the new market company of Ringier, SRG SSR, and Swisscom.

Through its commercial activities, Publisuisse contributed approximately one-sixth of SRG SSR's total operating income and one-quarter of its television revenues each year.

Publisuisse employed about 111 people. The company's headquarters were in Bern, while its commercial headquarters were in Zurich. Publisuisse also had regional commercial offices in Geneva, Lausanne and Lugano.

The shareholders were SRG SSR (99.8%) and the Swiss Union of Arts and Crafts (0.2%).
