= Landman, Kazakhstan =

Village in Kazakhstan

Landman Ландман
- Village
- Location in Kazakhstan
- Coordinates: 49°45′47″N 84°19′49″E
- Country: Kazakhstan
- Region: East Kazakhstan Region
- District: Altai District
- First mentioned: 1895

Population (2021)
  - Total: 35
- Time zone: UTC+5
- Postal code: F42P3P9 (070832)

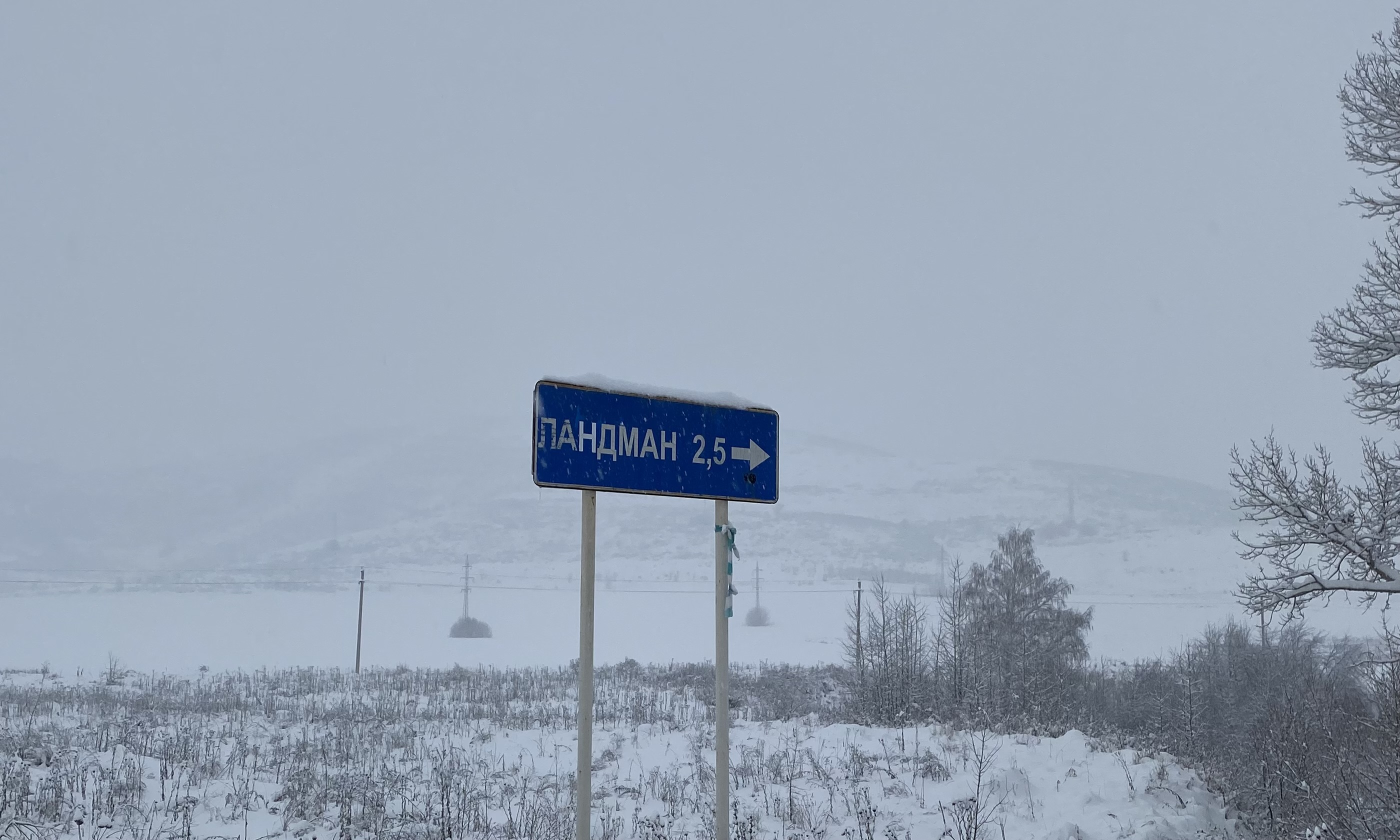
Village view of Landman

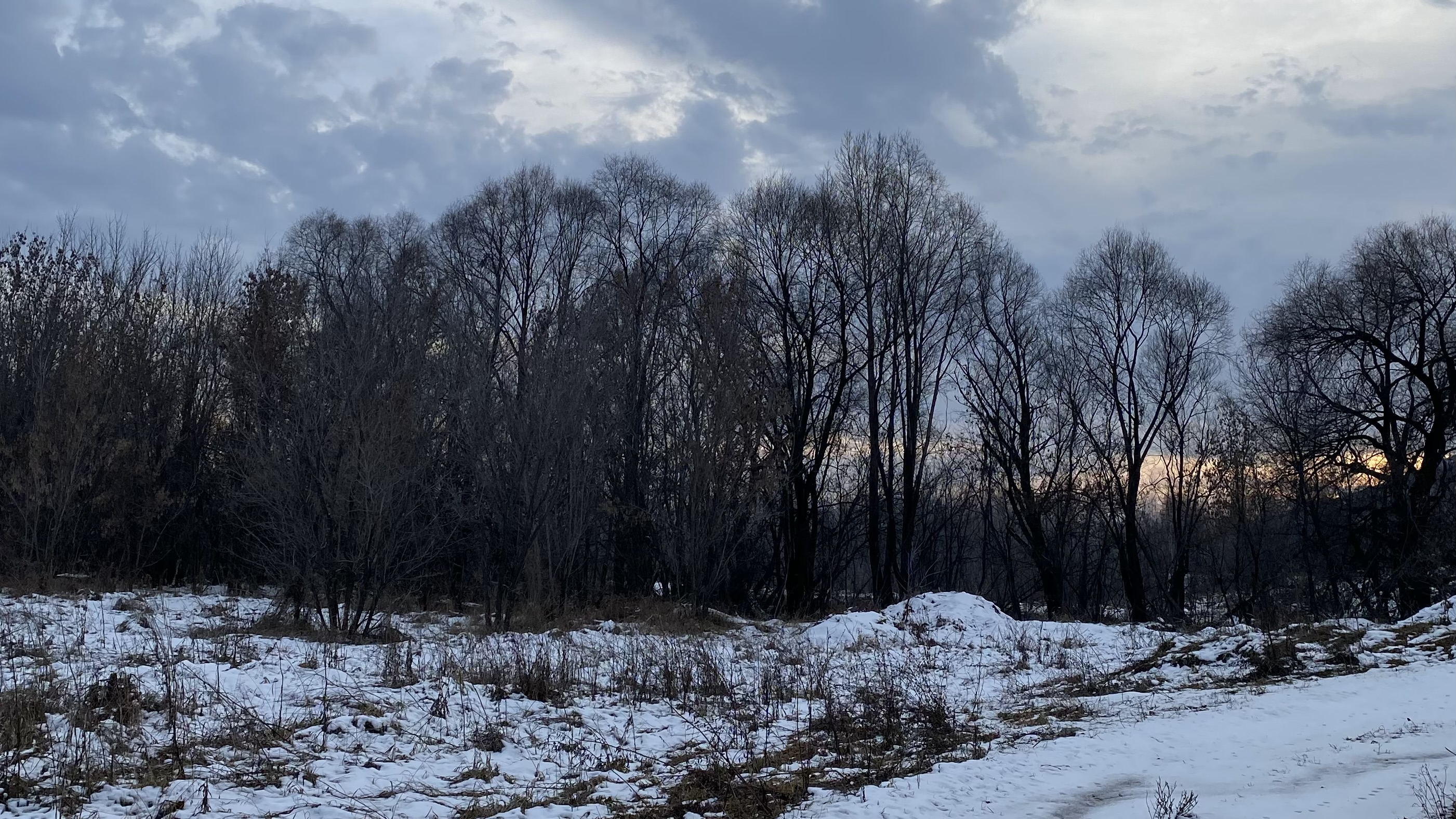
Winter forest near Landman

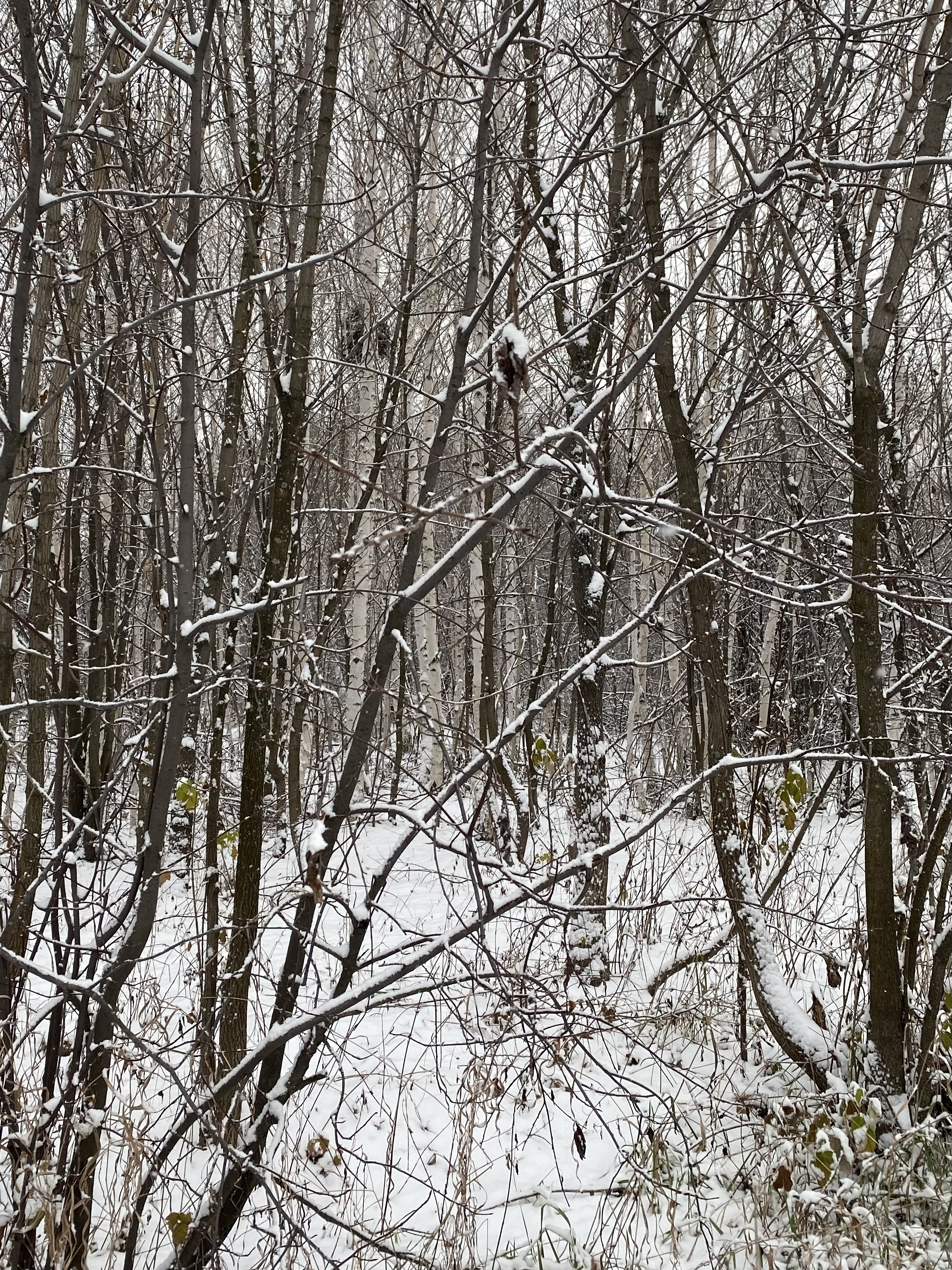
Winter in Landman

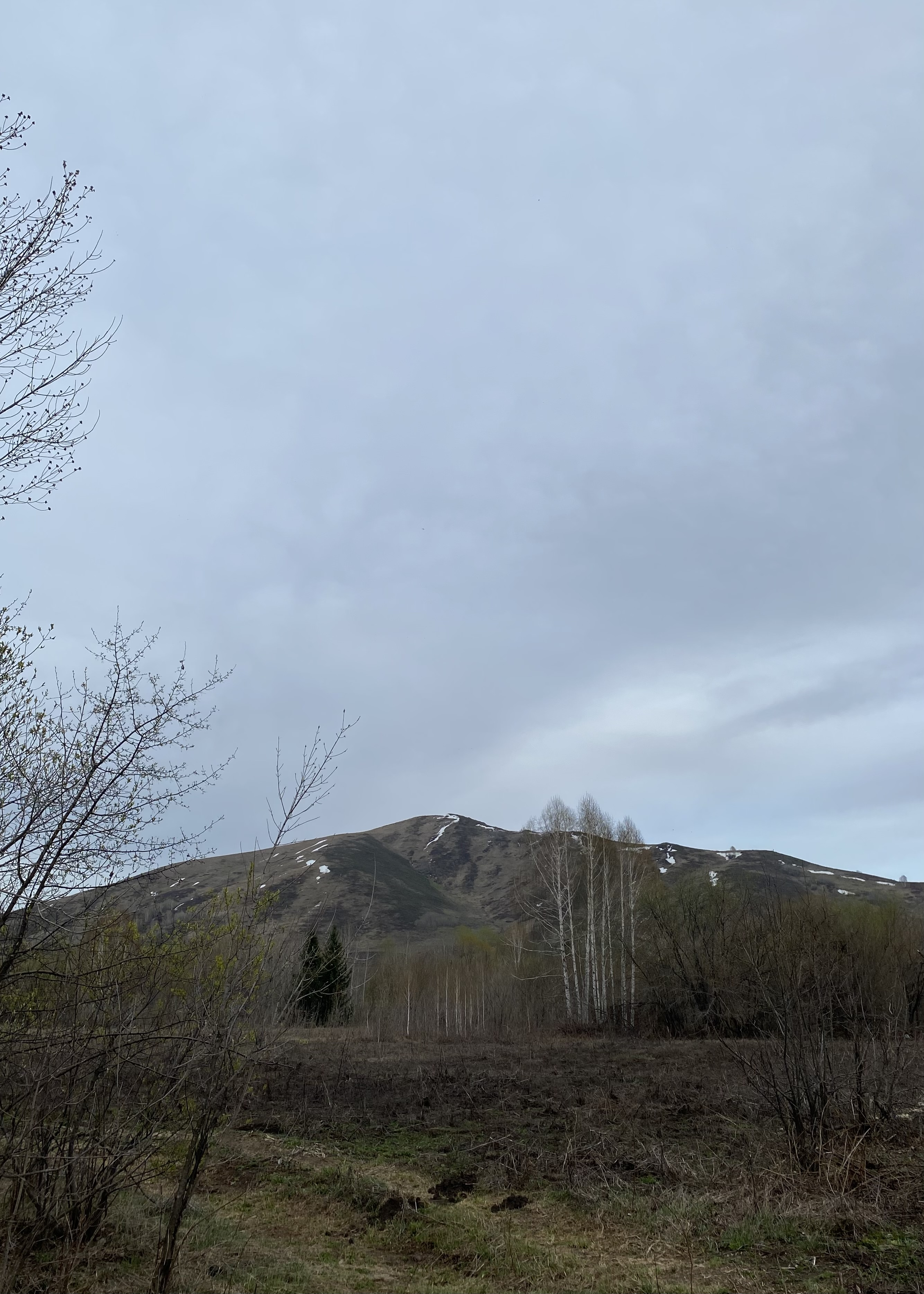
Mount Revnyukha

Landman (kazakh: Ландман; russian: Ландман) is a rural locality in the Altai District of East Kazakhstan Region. Historically, it was a German settlement. The name Landmann in German translates to "farmer". It is part of the Maleyevsky rural district and is situated on the right bank of the Beriozovka River, northeast of the district center, the city of Altai. Its KATO code is 634833300.

== Economy and agriculture ==
The renaming of "Sovietskaya Street" to "Sadovaya Street" (“Garden Street”) reflects the village’s agricultural heritage. After the collapse of the state farm in the 1990s, many institutions ceased operation.

== Literature and archives ==
Historical archives by Ivan I. Schellenberg mentions the migration of Germans to Siberia, including villages such as Landman, dating back to 1736.

== Population ==
Since the 1940s, the village has had a notable German community, along with Russians and Ukrainians. Archival documents on the residents of Landman can be found in the CPSU records, the State Archives of East Kazakhstan, and databases such as "Victims of Political Terror in the USSR" and “Recovered Names.”

Seventeen Germans were documented in Landman between 1895 and 1916.
