= Salcia Landmann =

Jewish writer

Salcia Landmann, born Salcia Passweg (Hebrew: זלציה לנדמן; 18 November 1911 – 16 May 2002), was a Jewish writer. She was born in Zhovkva, Galicia, and died in St. Gallen, Switzerland. She worked on preserving the Yiddish language, and she wrote the important work Der Jüdische Witz (Jewish Humor). She was one of the founders of the International PEN in Liechtenstein. She had one son, Valentin Landmann, and was married to philosopher Michael Landmann from 1939.

== Life ==
Landmann was born Salcia Passweg in Zhovkva, Galicia in 1911. Her parents Israel and Regina Passweg were from well-off Jewish families. She grew up on her grandparents' estate in Zhovkva until she was six, when her parents moved to St Gallen, where she attended grammar school. She studied in Berlin, Basel and later in Geneva, Paris and Zurich, earning a Magistra artis and a doctoral degree, with a dissertation on phenomenology and ontology and Martin Heidegger.

Landmann worked on preserving the Yiddish language, and she wrote the important work Der Jüdische Witz (Jewish Humor). The book contained more than a thousand Jewish jokes, a foreword by Professor Carlo Schmid and an introduction by Landmann. Landmann also wrote about Jewish cookery from Eastern Europe, and worked as a translator on a number of Yiddish works, including stories by Scholem Alejchem. She wrote numerous newspaper articles, and published anthologies of anecdotes, essays and proverbs documenting Jewish culture.

She was one of the founders of the International PEN in Liechtenstein in 1978.

She had one son, Valentin Landmann, and was married to philosopher Michael Landmann from 1948. She met her husband in Basel, where the couple became friendly with Jean Amery, Ernst Bloch, Max Horkheimer and Martin Buber.

She died in St. Gallen, Switzerland in 2002, at the age of 90. After her death her son donated her archives to the Vadiana Cantonal Library in St. Gallen.
