= UCSF School of Pharmacy =

School of the U of California, San Francisco

School of Pharmacy
- Former name: California College of Pharmacy
- Type: Public
- Established: 1872
- Parent institution: University of California, San Francisco
- Dean: Kathy Giacomini
- Academic staff: 863
- Students: 817
- Doctoral students: 152
- Location: San Francisco, California; 37°45′46″N 122°27′29″W
- Website: pharmacy.ucsf.edu

UCSF School of Pharmacy, is the pharmacy school of the University of California, San Francisco, and is located in San Francisco. Founded in 1872, it is the oldest pharmacy school in California and the western United States. For 41 consecutive years it has been the top recipient of NIH funding among all US pharmacy programs, with a total of $40.9 million in awards in 2020 (increasing almost $15 million from the previous year). In 2020, it was ranked second nationwide by U.S. News & World Report.

== History ==
The school was founded in 1872 as the California College of Pharmacy by the California Pharmaceutical Society, itself then only four years old. At the time, the school became the first in the West and the tenth in the United States. The objectives of the founders were to “advance pharmaceutical knowledge and elevate the professional character of apothecaries throughout California.” On June 2, 1873, the college affiliates with the University of California, shortly after the Toland Medical College affiliates. The two schools became UCSF's first two “affiliated colleges” and were followed by the College of Dentistry in 1881 and the UC Training School for Nurses in 1907.

In 2018, it transitioned its PharmD curriculum from 4 years to a 3-year, year-round program.
