= Lanzmann =

Lanzmann is a surname. Notable people with the surname include:

- Claude Lanzmann (1925–2018), French filmmaker
- Jacques Lanzmann (1927–2006), French writer, scriptwriter, and lyric writer

== See also ==
- Landsman
- Landmann
- Heinrich Landesmann (1821-1902), Austrian poet and philosophical writer.
