= Fred Landman =

Dutch-born Israeli professor of semantics (b.1956)

- פרד לנדמן
- Born: October 28, 1956 (age 69); Amsterdam, Netherlands

Philosophical work
- Institutions: Brown University; Cornell University; Tel Aviv University

Fred (Alfred) Landman (Hebrew: פרד לנדמן; born October 28, 1956) is a Dutch-born Israeli professor emeritus of semantics. He taught at Tel Aviv University and has written a number of books about linguistics.

== Biography ==
Fred Landman was born in Holland. He immigrated to Israel in 1993. He was married to London-born linguist Susan Rothstein until her death in 2019. The couple had one daughter and resided in Tel Aviv.

== Academic career ==
Landman is known for his work on progressives, polarity phenomena, groups, and other topics in semantics and pragmatics. He taught at Brown University and Cornell University before moving to Israel.

== Published works ==
- Indefinites and the Type of Sets (2004)
- Events and Plurality: The Jerusalem Lectures (2000)
- Structures for Semantics (1991)
- Towards a Theory of Information. The Status of Partial Objects in Semantics (1986)
- Iceberg Semantics for Mass Nouns and Count Nouns (2020)

== Awards and distinctions ==
2014 Humboldt Research Award
