= Michael Landmann =

Swiss philosopher (1913–1984)

Michael Landmann (16 December 1913 in Basel – 25 January 1984 in Haifa) was a Swiss-Jewish philosopher.

== Life ==
Landmann was the son of economist Julius Landmann and philosopher Edith Landmann. Philologist Georg Peter Landmann is his brother. His parents were friends of Stefan George and were connected to the Georgekreis, a circle of writers inspired by George.

Since his father had worked in Kiel, Landmann attended a gymnasium there from 1927 to 1933. Having returned to Switzerland, he studied philosophy, psychology and German studies at the University of Basel. Herman Schmalenbach, Paul Häberlin und Walter Muschg were among his teachers. 1939 he received his doctorate with a thesis on Socratic philosophy as an ethic of values (Der Sokratismus als Wertethik). After assisting Schmalenbach and Karl Jaspers, Landmann earned his habilitation under the mentorship of Otto Friedrich Bollnow at the University of Mainz. From 1951 till 1978 Landmann was professor of philosophy at the Free University of Berlin. His main field of study was philosophical anthropology

Since 1939, Landmann was married to the Jewish writer Salcia Landmann, born Passweg.

== Select bibliography ==
- Landmann, Michael (1943). Der Sokratismus als Werteethik, Basel Dissertation
- Landmann, Michael (1949). Problematik. Nichtwissen und Wissenverlangen im Philosopischen Bewußtsein. Göttingen
- Landmann, Michael (1974). Philosophical anthropology. Philadelphia: Westminster Press. ISBN 978-0664209957.
- Landmann, Michael (1985). Fundamental Anthropology. Center for Advanced Research in Phenomoenology, University Press of America. ISBN 978-0819148438.
- Landmann, Michael (1979). De Homine: Man in the Mirror of His Thought. Univ Microfilms Intl. ISBN 978-0835704595.
