= Sandy Landsman =

American writer

- Born: Great Neck, New York, U.S.
- Occupation: Children's book author, entertainer
- Education: Columbia University (English)
- Years active: 1980s–present
- Notable works: The Gadget Factor (1984), Castaways on Chimp Island (1986)

Sandy Landsman is a children's book author. He was born in Great Neck, New York. He moved to the city to attend Columbia University, where he majored in English. During his senior year, he began entertaining at children's parties as a musical clown. This became a career for him, along with a cable children's show which he wrote and starred in. He is the author of the children's books The Gadget Factor (1984), and Castaways on Chimp Island (1986).
