= Landsman =

Landsman is a surname. Notable people with the surname include:

- Alexandra Landsman, American physicist
- Anne Landsman (born 1959), South African-born female novelist
- Greg Landsman (born 1976), American politician
- Jay Landsman, homicide detective and actor from Baltimore, USA
- Keren Landsman (born 1977), Israeli epidemiologist and science-fiction writer.
- Matilda Landsman, New York Times female employee in the 1950s
- Sandy Landsman, children's book author, born in Great Neck, New York
- Vladimir Landsman (born 1941), Soviet-Canadian violinist and teacher

Fictional characters:

- Jay Landsman (The Wire), character on the HBO drama The Wire, inspired by the real life Jay Landsman
- Meyer Landsman, an alcoholic homicide detective with the Sitka police department in Michael Chabon's 2007 novel The Yiddish Policemen's Union

== See also ==
- Maik Landsmann (born 1967), East German track cyclist
- Lanzmann, a surname
- Landmann, a surname
