= Kerry Landman =

Australian applied mathematician

Kerry Landman FAA
- Born: Kerry Anne Landman
- Education: University of Melbourne
- Scientific career
- Fields: Applied mathematics, mathematical modelling
- Workplaces: University of Melbourne
- Thesis: Bifurcation and stability of solutions (1978)

Kerry Anne Landman FAA is an Australian applied mathematician, known for her cross-disciplinary research. Over her research career she established and led collaborations across engineering, industry and biological fields. In 2007, she became the first woman professor in the School of Mathematics and Statistics at the University of Melbourne. She retired in 2015 and is now an Emeritus Professor at the University of Melbourne.

== Education and career ==
Landman earned a Bachelor of Science degree in mathematics (with honours) and a PhD in mathematics at the University of Melbourne. Her PhD thesis, "Bifurcation and Stability of Solutions", was supervised by Professor Simon Rosenblat. Landman then spent six years working in the US, at the Massachusetts Institute of Technology, the Environmental Protection Agency and Southern Methodist University. She returned to Melbourne to join Siromath, a mathematical sciences consulting firm, before joining the Department of Mathematics at University of Melbourne in 1986. While at the University of Melbourne, she was the Director of the Mathematics-in-Industry Study Group from 1993 to 1997. In 2007, she was promoted to professor of mathematics at the University of Melbourne.

== Awards ==
Landman was elected a Fellow of the Australian Academy of Science in 2019.

In 2014 she was awarded the ANZIAM medal, the premier medal of the Australia and New Zealand Industrial and Applied Mathematics Society.

In 2014 Landman was awarded the Strathcona Medal from Strathcona Girls Grammar School, in recognition of excellence in a profession and exceptional service to the wider community.

Landman was awarded an Australian Research Council Professorial Fellow (2008–2012).

== Other ==
The Kerry Landman Scholarship was introduced to support mathematics graduates who would otherwise be unable to study due to the cost of fees. Recipients must be passionate about education, want to train as mathematics teachers and enrol in a Master of Teaching (Secondary) at the University of Melbourne. The scholarship aims to address the shortage of mathematically trained teachers.

In 2019, Landman joined the Board of The Institute of Enquiring Minds. The Institute provides free mathematics mentoring and tutoring to improve the mathematics skills of financially disadvantaged high school students.
