= Heinrich Landesmann =

Austrian poet & philosopher (1821–1902)

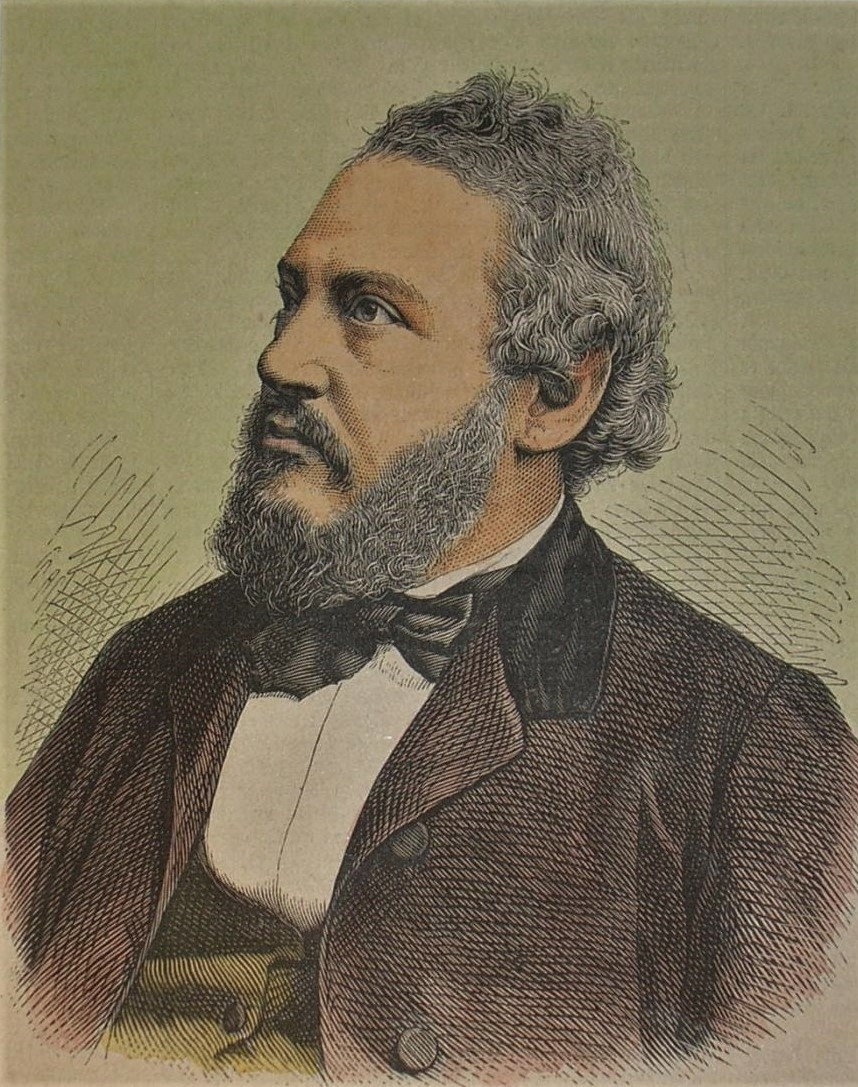
- Heinrich Landesmann in 1878

Heinrich Landesmann (9 August 1821, Nikolsburg – 4 December 1902, Brno), more commonly known by his pseudonym, Hieronymus Lorm, was an Austrian poet and philosophical writer.

== Life ==
From his earliest childhood he was very sickly; at the age of fifteen his sight and hearing were almost completely destroyed; and later in life he became totally blind. He developed the Lorm alphabet, a form of tactile signing named after him.

When he was 16, he contributed a number of poems to various periodicals. In 1843 he completed his first important literary production, Abdul, the Mohammedan Faust legend, in five cantos (2nd ed. Berlin, 1852).

His Wien's Poetische Schwingen und Federn (Vienna, 1847) manifested critical acumen, but also a tinge of political acerbity in its attack on the censor system of the Austrian chancellor Prince Metternich. His friends advised Landesmann to leave Vienna, and he went to Berlin, where he assumed the pseudonym Hieronymus Lorm in order to secure his family from possible trouble with the Viennese police. In Berlin he became a regular contributor to Kühne's Europa. After the revolution of 1848 he returned to Vienna, settling in Baden bei Wien in 1853.

In 1856 he married; in 1873 he moved to Dresden; and in 1892 he settled in Brünn (Brno). A sister of Landesmann's was the second wife of Berthold Auerbach. Landesmann was distinctively a lyric poet. The peculiar vein of pessimism that runs through both his poetry and his prose writings has won for him the title of the "lyrical Schopenhauer".

== Works ==
His more important works are:

- Ein Zögling des Jahres 1848
  his first novel (3 vols., Vienna, 1855; 3d ed., 1863, under the title Gabriel Solmar), in which he treats, among other subjects, of the struggle of the modern Jew against the prejudices of his fellow citizens.
- Am Kamin (2 vols., Berlin, 1856)
- Erzählungen des Heimgekehrten (Prague, 1858)
- Intimes Leben (ib. 1860)
- Novellen (2 vols., Vienna, 1864)
- Gedichte (Hamburg, 1870; 7th ed., 1894)
- Philosophisch-Kritische Streifzüge (Berlin, 1873)
- Geflügelte Stunden. Leben, Kritik, Dichtung (3 vols., Leipzig, 1875)
- the dramas Das Forsthaus, Hieronymus Napoleon, and Die Alten und die Jungen (1875)
- Der Naturgenuss. Eine Philosophie der Jahreszeiten (Berlin, 1876)
- Neue Gedichte (Dresden, 1877)
- Todte Schuld (2 vols., Stuttgart, 1878)
- Späte Vergeltung (2 vols., Hamburg, 1879)
- Der Ehrliche Name (2 vols., Dresden, 1880)
- Wanderer's Ruhebank (Leipzig, 1881)
- Ausserhalb der Gesellschaft (ib. 1881)
- Der Abend zu Hause (Breslau, 1881)
- Ein Schatten aus Vergangenen Tagen (Stuttgart, 1882)
- Ein Kind des Meeres (Dresden, 1882)
- Der Fahrende Geselle (Leipzig, 1884)
- Vor dem Attentat (Dresden, 1884)
- Natur und Geist im Verhältnis zu den Kulturepochen (Teschen, 1884)
- Die Schöne Wienerin (Jena, 1886)
- Das Leben Kein Traum (Breslau, 1887)
- Auf dem Einsamen Schlosse (1887)
- Die Muse des Glücks und Moderne Einsamkeit (Dresden, 1893)
- Der Grundlose Optimismus (Vienna, 1894)

== Bibliography ==
- Karpeles, Gustav. "Hieronymus Lorm: Ein Nachruf." Allgemeine Zeitung des Judentums, December 12, 1902, p. 593-595
- "Landesmann, Heinrich." Meyers Großes Konversations-Lexikon, 6th revised and expanded edition. Volume 12. Leipzig and Vienna: Bibliographisches Institut, 1905. p. 102
- "Lorm, Hieronymus." Biographisches Schriftsteller-Lexikon der Gegenwart. Edited by Franz Bornmüller. Leipzig: Verlag des Bibliographischen Instituts, 1882. p. 443
- Wolf, A. L. "Hieronymus Lorm." Allgemeine Zeitung des Judentums, August 1, 1891, p. 375-377
- Oesterreichische Wochenschrift, December 12, 1902
- Link to Jewish Encyclopedia
