= Quarter gunner =

Military rank in naval forces

Quarter gunner was a military rank used in naval forces.

== United Kingdom ==
In the Royal Navy in the middle of the 18th century, the term "quarter gunner" was used for referring a type of seaman specialized in maintenance of guns. The position was part of the gunner's crew, and one quarter gunner was assigned for every four guns.

== United States ==
Quarter gunner was a type of petty officer in the ranks of the 19th century United States Navy. Similar to the equivalent rank in Britain, for every four naval guns there would be a quarter gunner. Quarter gunners were under the command of gunner's mates, and were responsible for guns' maintenance and operations.
