= William Nichols (Medal of Honor) =

- Born: c. 1837; New York City
- Military career
- Allegiance: United States
- Branch: United States Navy
- Rank: Quartermaster
- Unit: (United States Navy) USS Brooklyn
- Conflicts: American Civil War • Battle of Mobile Bay
- Awards: Medal of Honor

William Nichols (c. 1837 – date of death unknown) was a Union Navy sailor in the American Civil War and a recipient of the Medal of Honor for his actions at the Battle of Mobile Bay.

Born in about 1837 in New York City, Nichols was still living in the state of New York when he joined the Navy. He served during the Civil War as a quartermaster on the USS Brooklyn. At the Battle of Mobile Bay on August 5, 1864, he "fought his gun with skill and courage" despite heavy fire. For this action, he was awarded the Medal of Honor four months later, on December 31, 1864.

Nichols's official Medal of Honor citation reads:

On board the U.S.S. Brooklyn during successful attacks against Fort Morgan, rebel gunboats and the ram Tennessee, in Mobile Bay, on 5 August 1864. Despite severe damage to his ship and the loss of several men on board as enemy fire raked her decks from stem to stern, Nichols fought his gun with skill and courage throughout the furious battle which resulted in the surrender of the prize rebel ram Tennessee, and in the damaging and destruction of batteries at Fort Morgan.
