= Edward Price (Medal of Honor) =

- Born: c. 1840; New York
- Military career
- Allegiance: United States
- Branch: United States Navy
- Rank: Coxswain
- Unit: USS Brooklyn
- Conflicts: American Civil War • Battle of Mobile Bay
- Awards: Medal of Honor

Edward Price (born c. 1840, date of death unknown) was a Union Navy sailor in the American Civil War and a recipient of the U.S. military's highest decoration, the Medal of Honor, for his actions at the Battle of Mobile Bay.

Born in about 1840 in New York, Price was still living in that state when he joined the Navy. He served during the Civil War as a coxswain on the USS Brooklyn. Throughout the Battle of Mobile Bay on August 5, 1864, he helped work one of Brooklyn's artillery pieces, at one point fixing the disabled gun by clearing a broken sponge from its barrel. For this action, he was awarded the Medal of Honor four months later, on December 31, 1864.

Price's official Medal of Honor citation reads:

On board the U.S.S. Brooklyn during successful attacks against Fort Morgan, rebel gunboats and the ram Tennessee in Mobile Bay, 5 August 1864. When the sponge broke, leaving the head in the gun, and completely disabling the weapon, Price immediately cleared it by pouring powder into the vent and blowing the sponge head out, thereafter continuing to man the weapon until the close of the furious action which resulted in the capture of the prize rebel ram Tennessee and in the infliction of damage and destruction on Fort Morgan.
