= J. Henry Denig =

John Henry Denig
- Born: September 8, 1838; York, Pennsylvania
- Died: December 10, 1876 (aged 38); York, Pennsylvania
- Burial place: Prospect Hill Cemetery, York, Pennsylvania
- Military career
- Allegiance: United States of America; Union
- Branch: United States Marine Corps
- Service years: 1861 - 1864
- Rank: Sergeant
- Units: Marine Detachment, USS Brooklyn
- Conflicts: American Civil War • Battle of Mobile Bay
- Awards: Medal of Honor

John Henry Denig (September 8, 1838 – December 10, 1876) was a United States Marine Corps sergeant serving aboard the USS Brooklyn during the American Civil War. He received the Medal of Honor for his actions in 1864 during the Battle of Mobile Bay.

Denig was born in York, Pennsylvania, on September 8, 1838, according to some army records. However, his family tombstone cites a date in 1845, making him 16 at the time of his enlistment in the Civil War. He enlisted in Marine Corps from Philadelphia in June 1861 and served as a sergeant on the USS Brooklyn during the Battle of Mobile Bay, Alabama. Mobile was the last Confederate-held port on the Gulf of Mexico east of the Mississippi River, and its capture would complete the Union blockade in the area. In the August 5, 1864, attack, Brooklyn engaged Fort Morgan and the CSS Tennessee (1863). Throughout the two-hour battle, Denig fought "with skill courage", for which he was later awarded the Medal of Honor. Twenty-two of his shipmates also received the medal for their part in the battle, which ended with a Union victory. He was honorably discharged in September 1864.

Denig died of health complications at age 38 and was buried in York's Prospect Hill Cemetery. He is one of two Medal of Honor recipients interred in the cemetery, the other being Charles H. Ilgenfritz.

== Medal of Honor citation ==
On December 31, 1864, by Navy Department General Order Number 45, Denig was awarded the Medal of Honor. His citation reads:

On board the U.S.S. Brooklyn during action against rebel forts and gunboats and with the ram Tennessee, in Mobile Bay, 5 August 1864. Despite severe damage to his ship and the loss of several men on board as enemy fire raked her decks, Sgt. Denig fought his gun with skill and courage throughout the furious 2-hour battle which resulted in the surrender of the rebel ram Tennessee and in the damaging and destruction of batteries at Fort Morgan.

== See also ==
- List of American Civil War Medal of Honor recipients: A–F
