= John Brown (sailor) =

- Born: Thomas Hayes c. 1826; Glasgow, Scotland
- Died: November 1, 1883 (aged 56–57); Sonoma, California
- Military career
- Allegiance: United States
- Branch: United States Navy
- Rank: Captain of the Forecastle
- Unit: USS Brooklyn
- Conflicts: American Civil War • Battle of Mobile Bay
- Awards: Medal of Honor

John Brown (c. 1826 – November 1, 1883) was a Union Navy sailor in the American Civil War and a recipient of the U.S. military's highest decoration, the Medal of Honor, for his actions at the Battle of Mobile Bay.

Born in 1826 in Glasgow, Scotland, Brown's birth name was Thomas Hayes. He immigrated to the United States and was living in New York when he joined the U.S. Navy. He served during the Civil War as a captain of the forecastle on the USS Brooklyn. At the Battle of Mobile Bay on August 5, 1864, he "fought his gun with skill and courage" despite heavy fire. For this action, he was awarded the Medal of Honor four months later, on December 31, 1864.

Brown's official Medal of Honor citation reads:

On board the U.S.S. Brooklyn during action against rebel forts and gunboats and with the ram Tennessee in Mobile Bay, 5 August 1864. Despite severe damage to his ship and the loss of several men on board as enemy fire raked her decks from stem to stern, Brown fought his gun with skill and courage throughout the furious battle which resulted in the surrender of the prize rebel ram Tennessee and in the damaging and destruction of batteries at Fort Morgan.

Brown died on November 1, 1883, at age 56 or 57.
