= William Halstead (sailor) =

Coxwain William Halstead Sr.
- Born: February 9, 1837; Schroeppel, New York
- Died: July 25, 1916 (aged 79); Toledo, Ohio
- Burial place: Forest Cemetery, Toledo, Ohio; 41.651031°N 83.541939°W
- Military career
- Allegiance: United States
- Branch: United States Navy
- Service years: 1863, 1864
- Rank: Coxswain
- Units: (United States Navy) USS Dale (United States Navy) USS Brooklyn
- Conflicts: American Civil War • Battle of Mobile Bay
- Awards: Medal of Honor

William Halstead (February 9, 1837 – July 25, 1916) was a Union Navy sailor in the American Civil War and a recipient of the U.S. military's highest decoration, the Medal of Honor, for his actions at the Battle of Mobile Bay.

Born on January 9, 1837, in Schroeppel, New York, Halstead began his seafaring career as a young man. He first worked on whaling ships out of the Pacific Northwest, then sailed the Pacific as a merchant mariner.

Halstead joined the U.S. Navy from his home state of New York and served over two years on the USS Dale, suppressing the slave trade off the coast of Africa in the 1850s. Following the onset of the Civil War, he helped enforce the Union blockade at the mouth of the Mississippi River and was present at the capture of New Orleans in 1862. At the Battle of Mobile Bay on August 5, 1864, he "fought his gun with skill and courage" despite heavy fire as a coxswain on the USS Brooklyn. For this action, he was awarded the Medal of Honor four months later, on December 31, 1864.

Halstead's official Medal of Honor citation reads:

On board the U.S.S. Brooklyn during action against rebel forts and gunboats and with the ram Tennessee, in Mobile Bay, 5 August 1864. Despite severe damage to his ship and the loss of several men on board as enemy fire raked her decks from stem to stern, Halstead fought his gun with skill and courage throughout the furious battle which resulted in the surrender of the prize rebel ram Tennessee and in the damaging and destruction of batteries at Fort Morgan.

After the war, Halstead settled in Toledo, Ohio, and worked for the Wheeling and Lake Erie Railway. He died on July 23, 1916, at age 79 and was buried at Forest Cemetery in Toledo. He is one of two Medal of Honor recipients interred in the cemetery, the other being fellow Civil War veteran Mark Wood.

== See also ==
- USS Brooklyn
- Battle of Mobile Bay
