= Joseph Irlam =

- Born: 1840; Liverpool, England
- Died: Unknown
- Military career
- Allegiance: United States
- Branch: United States Navy
- Rank: Seaman
- Unit: USS Brooklyn
- Conflicts: American Civil War • Battle of Mobile Bay
- Awards: Medal of Honor

Joseph Irlam (born 1840, date of death unknown) was a Union Navy sailor in the American Civil War and a recipient of the U.S. military's highest decoration, the Medal of Honor, for his actions at the Battle of Mobile Bay.

Born in 1840 in Liverpool, England, Irlam immigrated to the United States and was living in New York when he joined the U.S. Navy. He served during the Civil War as a seaman on the USS Brooklyn. At the Battle of Mobile Bay on August 5, 1864, he was stationed at the ship's wheel when Brooklyn took heavy fire. After several members of the gun crews became casualties, he ordered two of his assistants to take their places, leaving himself with only one aide for the remainder of the battle. For this action, he was awarded the Medal of Honor four months later, on December 31, 1864.

Irlam's official Medal of Honor citation reads:

Stationed at the wheel on board the U.S.S. Brooklyn during action against rebel forts and gunboats and with the ram Tennessee in Mobile Bay, 5 August 1864. When heavy enemy fire struck down several men at their guns and replacements were not available, Irlam voluntarily released 2 men who were stationed with him and carried on at the wheel with the assistance of only one of the crew throughout the furious battle.
