= Willard M. Smith =

United States Marine Corps Medal of Honor recipient

- Civil War era Navy Medal of Honor
- Born: 1840; Allegany, New York, US
- Died: March 26, 1918 (aged 77–78); Buffalo, New York, US
- Burial place: Elmlawn Cemetery Kenmore, New York
- Military career
- Allegiance: United States of America; Union
- Branch: United States Marine Corps
- Service years: 1862 - 1866
- Rank: Sergeant
- Unit: USS Brooklyn
- Conflicts: American Civil War
- Awards: Medal of Honor

Willard Moon Smith (1840-March 26, 1918) was a sergeant serving in the United States Marine Corps during the American Civil War who received the Medal of Honor for his actions in the Battle of Mobile Bay.

== Biography ==
Smith was born in 1840 in Allegany, New York, and entered the Marine Corps from Brooklyn, New York on August 18, 1862. He was a corporal assigned to the Marine Detachment aboard the USS Brooklyn when it was sent to fight in the American Civil War during the Battle of Mobile Bay.

He was discharged from the Marine Corps on August 19, 1866. He died on March 26, 1918, and is buried at Elmlawn Cemetery in Kenmore, New York.

== Medal of Honor citation ==
Rank and organization: Corporal, U.S. Marine Corps. Born: 1840, Alleghany, N.Y. Accredited to: New York. G.O. No.: 45, 31 December 1864.

Citation:

On board the U.S.S. Brooklyn during action against rebel forts and gunboats, and with the ram Tennessee in Mobile Bay, 5 August 1864. Despite severe damage to his ship and the loss of several men on board as enemy fire continued to fall, Cpl. Smith fought his gun with skill and courage throughout the furious 2 hour battle which resulted in the surrender of the rebel ram Tennessee.

== See also ==
- List of American Civil War Medal of Honor recipients: Q–S
