= Samuel W. Davis =

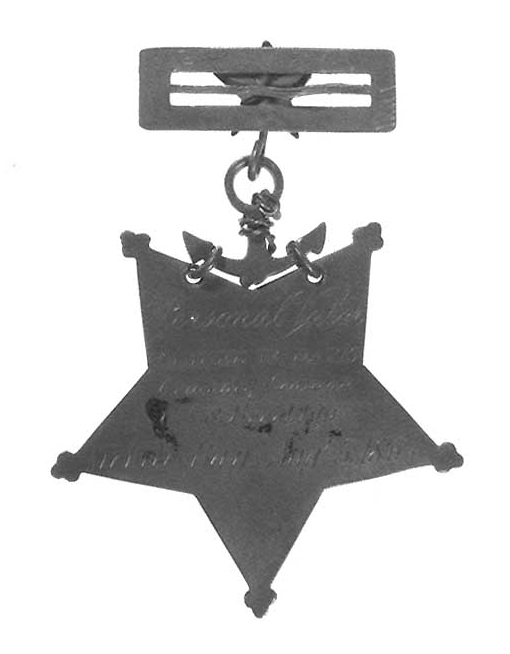
- Reverse of Davis' Medal of Honor
- Born: January 23, 1846; Brewer, Maine
- Died: May 5, 1914 (aged 68); Boston, Massachusetts
- Burial place: Oak Hill Cemetery; Brewer, Maine
- Military career
- Allegiance: United States of America; Union
- Branch: United States Navy; Union Navy
- Rank: Ordinary Seaman
- Unit: USS Brooklyn
- Conflicts: American Civil War • Battle of Mobile Bay
- Awards: Medal of Honor

Samuel Walker Davis (January 23, 1846 - May 5, 1914) was a Union Navy sailor in the American Civil War and a recipient of the U.S. military's highest decoration, the Medal of Honor, for his actions at the Battle of Mobile Bay.

== Military service ==
Born in 1846 in Brewer, Maine, Davis was still living in that city when he joined the Navy. He served during the Civil War as an ordinary seaman on the USS Brooklyn. At the Battle of Mobile Bay on August 5, 1864, he acted as a look-out for naval mines (then known as "torpedoes") despite heavy fire. For this action, he was awarded the Medal of Honor four months later, on December 31, 1864.

== Medal of Honor citation ==

Rank and organization: Ordinary Seaman, U.S. Navy, Accredited to: Maine, G.O. No.: 45, 31 December 1864

Davis's official Medal of Honor citation reads:

On board the U.S.S. Brooklyn during successful attacks against Fort Morgan, rebel gunboats and the ram Tennessee in Mobile Bay, on 5 August 1864. Despite severe damage to his ship and the loss of several men on board as enemy fire raked her decks from stem to stern, Davis exercised extreme courage and vigilance while acting as a look-out for torpedoes and other obstructions throughout the furious battle which resulted in the surrender of the prize rebel ram Tennessee and in the damaging and destruction of batteries at Fort Morgan.

== Death and burial ==
Medal of Honor recipient Samuel W. Davis died on May 5, 1914, of chronic diffuse nephritis at the Peter Bent Brigham Hospital in Boston, Massachusetts. He was buried in Oak Hill Cemetery in Brewer, Maine.

Davis' death notice in the May 7, 1914, Boston Herald newspaper read:

DAVIS - In this city, May 4, Samuel W. Davis, aged 63 yrs. Funeral services will be held at the funeral parlors of W. H. Graham, 1770 Washington st. Thursday afternoon, at 2 o'clock. Relatives and friends invited to attend. Burial at Brewer, Me.
