= Michael Hudson (Medal of Honor) =

- Born: c. 1834; County Sligo, Ireland
- Died: December 28, 1891 (aged 56–57)
- Burial place: Maple Hill Cemetery Charlotte, Michigan
- Military career
- Allegiance: United States of America; Union
- Branch: United States Marine Corps
- Service years: 1861-1865
- Rank: Sergeant
- Unit: USS Brooklyn
- Conflicts: American Civil War
- Awards: Medal of Honor

Michael Hudson (c. 1834 – December 28, 1891) was a sergeant serving in the United States Marine Corps during the American Civil War who received the Medal of Honor for his actions in the Battle of Mobile Bay.

== Life and career ==
Hudson's grave at Maple Hill Cemetery

Hudson was born in about 1834 in County Sligo, Ireland, and after immigrating to the United States he joined the Marine Corps from Brooklyn on September 12, 1861. He was a sergeant assigned to the Marine Detachment aboard the USS Brooklyn when it was sent to fight in the American Civil War. On August 5, 1864, during the Battle of Mobile Bay the Brooklyn, along with several other ships waged a campaign against several confederate controlled forts and gunboats. During the battle the Brooklyn suffered severe damage and several men on board were killed. Hudson continued fighting through the 2-hour battle which resulted in the surrender of the rebel ram CSS Tennessee. For this action he received the United States militaries highest decoration for valor, the Medal of Honor December 31, 1864.

Hudson was honorably discharged from the Marine Corps on October 25, 1865. He died December 28, 1891, and was buried at Maple Hill Cemetery in Charlotte, Michigan.

== Medal of Honor citation ==
Rank and organization: Sergeant, U.S. Marine Corps. Born: 1834, Sligo County, Ireland. Accredited to: New York. G.O. No.: 45, 31 December 1864.

Citation:

On board the U.S.S. Brooklyn during action against rebel forts and gunboats and with the ram Tennessee in Mobile Bay, 5 August 1864. Despite severe damage to his ship and the loss of several men on board as enemy fire raked the decks, Sgt. Hudson fought his gun with skill and courage throughout the furious 2-hour battle which resulted in the surrender of the rebel ram Tennessee.

== See also ==
- List of American Civil War Medal of Honor recipients: G–L
