= Richard Dennis (Medal of Honor) =

- Born: c. 1826; Charlestown, Massachusetts
- Died: 1889; Charlestown, Massachusetts
- Military career
- Allegiance: United States
- Branch: United States Navy
- Service years: 1864 - 1866
- Rank: Boatswain's Mate
- Unit: USS Brooklyn
- Conflicts: American Civil War • Battle of Mobile Bay
- Awards: Medal of Honor

Richard Dennis (c. 1826 - 1889) was a Union Navy sailor in the American Civil War and a recipient of the U.S. military's highest decoration, the Medal of Honor, for his actions at the Battle of Mobile Bay.

Dennis was born in 1826 in Charlestown, Massachusetts. He joined the Navy from Boston in March 1864, and served during the Civil War as a boatswain's mate on the USS Brooklyn. At the Battle of Mobile Bay on August 5, 1864, he operated the ship's torpedo catcher (an early naval minesweeping device) and helped fire the bow chase gun despite heavy fire. For this action, he was awarded the Medal of Honor four months later, on December 31, 1864. He was discharged in February 1866.

Dennis's official Medal of Honor citation reads:

On board the U.S.S. Brooklyn during successful attacks against Fort Morgan, rebel gunboats and the ram Tennessee in Mobile Bay, on 5 August 1864. Despite severe damage to his ship and the loss of several men on board as enemy fire raked her decks from stem to stern, Dennis displayed outstanding skill and courage in operating the torpedo catcher and in assisting in working the bow chasers throughout the furious battle which resulted in the surrender of the prize rebel ram Tennessee and in the damaging and destruction of batteries at Fort Morgan.
