= Barnett Kenna =

- Born: 1827; Canterbury, England
- Died: May 28, 1890 (aged 62–63)
- Burial place: Cherry Hill Cemetery, Gloucester, Massachusetts
- Military career
- Allegiance: United States
- Branch: United States Navy
- Service years: 1861 - 1866
- Rank: Quartermaster
- Unit: USS Brooklyn
- Conflicts: American Civil War • Battle of Mobile Bay
- Awards: Medal of Honor

Barnett Kenna (1827 – May 28, 1890) was a Union Navy sailor in the American Civil War and a recipient of the U.S. military's highest decoration, the Medal of Honor, for his actions at the Battle of Mobile Bay.

Kenna was born in 1827 in Canterbury, England. He joined the US Navy from Boston in November 1861, and served during the Civil War as a quartermaster on the USS Brooklyn. At the Battle of Mobile Bay on August 5, 1864, he "fought his gun with skill and courage" despite heavy fire. For this action, he was awarded the Medal of Honor four months later, on December 31, 1864. He was discharged in January 1866.

Kenna's official Medal of Honor citation reads:

On board the U.S.S. Brooklyn during action against rebel forts and gunboats and with the ram Tennessee, in Mobile Bay, 5 August 1864. Despite severe damage to his ship and the loss of several men on board as enemy fire raked her decks from stem to stern Kenna fought his gun with skill and courage throughout the furious action which resulted in the surrender of the rebel ram Tennessee and in the damaging and destruction of batteries at Fort Morgan.

Kenna died on May 28, 1890, at age 62 or 63 and was buried at Cherry Hill Cemetery in Gloucester, Massachusetts.
