= Samuel Todd =

- Born: c. 1815; Portsmouth, New Hampshire
- Military career
- Allegiance: United States
- Branch: United States Navy
- Rank: Quartermaster
- Unit: USS Brooklyn
- Conflicts: American Civil War • Battle of Mobile Bay
- Awards: Medal of Honor

Samuel Todd (born c. 1815, date of death unknown) was a Union Navy sailor in the American Civil War and a recipient of the U.S. military's highest decoration, the Medal of Honor, for his actions at the Battle of Mobile Bay.

== Background ==
Born in about 1815 in Portsmouth, New Hampshire, Todd was still living in that city when he joined the Navy. He served during the Civil War as a quartermaster on the USS Brooklyn. At the Battle of Mobile Bay on August 5, 1864, he acted as his ship's conning officer and "performed his duties with outstanding skill and courage" despite heavy fire. For this action, he was awarded the Medal of Honor four months later, on December 31, 1864.

Todd's official Medal of Honor citation reads:

Stationed at the conn on board the U.S.S. Brooklyn during action against rebel forts and gunboats and with the ram Tennessee in Mobile Bay, 5 August 1864. Despite severe damage to his ship and the loss of several men on board as enemy fire raked her decks from stem to stern, Todd performed his duties with outstanding skill and courage throughout the furious battle which resulted in the surrender of the prize rebel ram Tennessee and in the damaging and destruction of batteries at Fort Morgan.
