= Miles M. Oviatt =

American Civl War Medal of Honor recipient (1840–1880)

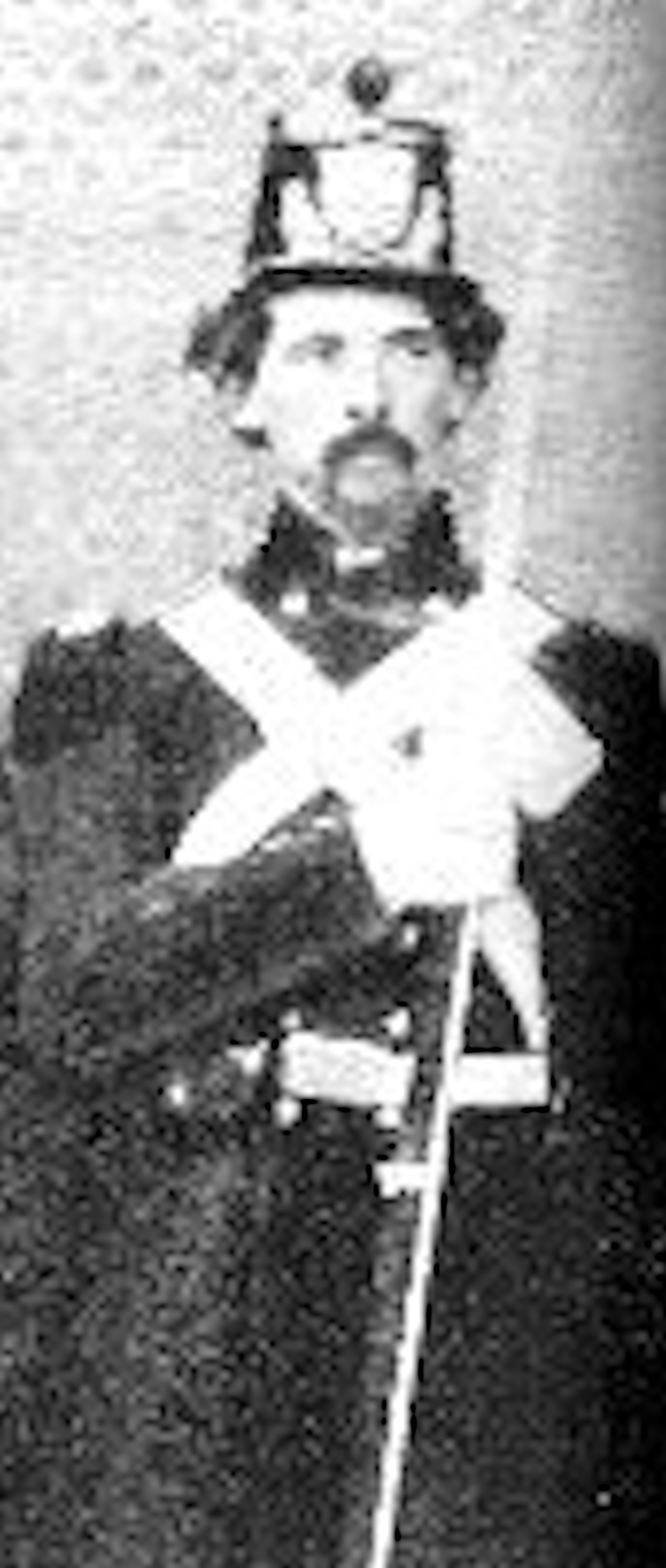
- Oviatt in 1865
- Born: December 1, 1840; Cattaraugus County, New York, US
- Died: November 1, 1880 (aged 39); New York, US
- Burial place: Pleasant Valley Cemetery, Olean, New York
- Military career
- Allegiance: United States; Union
- Branch: United States Marine Corps
- Service years: 1862 - 1866
- Rank: Sergeant
- Unit: USS Brooklyn
- Conflicts: American Civil War
- Awards: Medal of Honor

Miles Mason Oviatt (December 1, 1840 – November 1, 1880) was a Corporal serving in the Marine Corps aboard the USS Brooklyn (1858) who received the Medal of Honor for his actions in the American Civil War.

== Biography ==
Oviatt was born December 1, 1840, in Cattaraugus County, New York and on August 19, 1862, he joined the Marine Corps from Brooklyn, New York. He was assigned to the marine contingent aboard the USS Brooklyn (1858) during the American Civil War. The USS Brooklyn was sent into action against rebel forts and gunboats including the Confederate ram Tennessee in the Battle of Mobile Bay August 5, 1864.. During the battle several men aboard ship were killed and the ship sustained heavy damage from enemy fire. Oviatt continued to fire his gun throughout the two-hour battle which resulted in the surrender of the Tennessee. For his actions during the battle Oviatt received the Medal of Honor December 31, 1864.

Oviatt was honorably discharged with the rank of Sergeant on August 18, 1866, and died on November 1, 1880.

== Medal of Honor citation ==
Rank and organization: Corporal, U.S. Marine Corps. Born: 1840, Cattaraugus County, N.Y. Accredited to: New York. G.O. No.: 45, 31 December 1864.

Citation:

On board the U.S.S. Brooklyn during action against rebel forts and gunboats and with the ram Tennessee in Mobile Bay, 5 August 1864. Despite severe damage to his ship and the loss of several men on board as enemy fire raked the deck, Cpl. Oviatt fought his gun with skill and courage throughout the furious 2-hour battle which resulted in the surrender of the rebel ram Tennessee.

== See also ==
- List of American Civil War Medal of Honor recipients: M–P
