= William Blagheen =

Union soldier

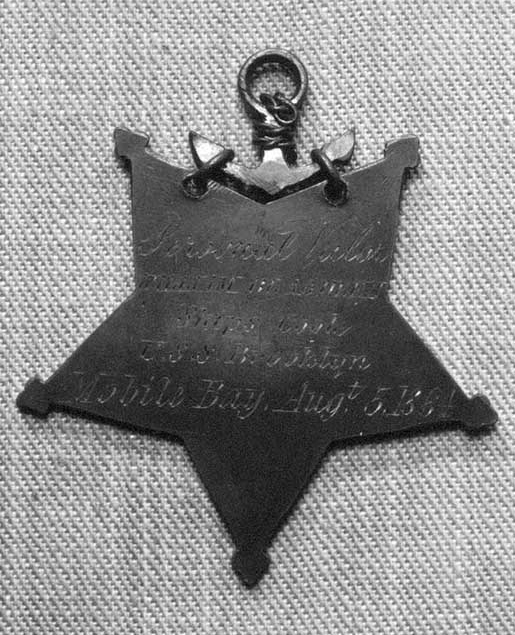
- Reverse of Blagheen's Medal of Honor
- Born: William Blagden c. 1832; Devon, England
- Died: after 1890
- Military career
- Allegiance: United States
- Branch: United States Navy
- Rank: Ship's Cook
- Unit: USS Brooklyn
- Conflicts: American Civil War • Battle of Mobile Bay
- Awards: Medal of Honor

William Blagheen (born c. 1832, date of death unknown), also known as William Blagden, was a Union Navy sailor in the American Civil War and a recipient of the U.S. military's highest decoration, the Medal of Honor, for his actions at the Battle of Mobile Bay.

== Biography ==
Born in 1832 in Devon, England, Blagheen immigrated to the United States and was living in New York City when he joined the U.S. Navy. He served during the Civil War as a ship's cook on the USS Brooklyn. At the Battle of Mobile Bay on August 5, 1864, he helped supply ammunition to Brooklyn's guns as part of the ship's powder division. He remained at his position near the shell whips (devices used to lift artillery shells up to the gun deck) despite heavy fire. For this action, he was awarded the Medal of Honor four months later, by General Order 45 dated December 31, 1864.

Blagheen deserted the same month his medal was issued, and apparently returned to New York. He is known to have applied for a pension in late 1890, which was rejected on account of his desertion.

Blagheen's official Medal of Honor citation reads:

On board the U.S.S. Brooklyn during successful attacks against Fort Morgan, rebel gunboats and the ram Tennessee in Mobile Bay, on 5 August 1864. Stationed in the immediate vicinity of the shell whips which were twice cleared of men by bursting shells, Blagheen remained steadfast at his post and performed his duties in the powder division throughout the furious action which resulted in the surrender of the prize rebel ram Tennessee and in the damaging and destruction of batteries at Fort Morgan.

== See also ==
- List of American Civil War Medal of Honor recipients: A-F
