= James E. Sterling =

United States Navy sailor and Medal of Honor recipient

- Civil War era Navy Medal of Honor
- Born: 1838; Baltimore, Maryland
- Died: Unknown
- Military career
- Allegiance: United States
- Branch: United States Navy
- Rank: Coal Heaver
- Unit: USS Brooklyn
- Conflicts: American Civil War • Battle of Mobile Bay
- Awards: Medal of Honor

James E. Sterling (born 1838, date of death unknown) was a Union Navy sailor in the American Civil War and a recipient of the U.S. military's highest decoration, the Medal of Honor, for his actions at the Battle of Mobile Bay.

== Biography ==
Born in 1838 in Baltimore, Maryland, Sterling was still living in that city when he joined the Navy. He served during the Civil War as a coal heaver on the USS Brooklyn. At the Battle of Mobile Bay on August 5, 1864, he helped supply ammunition to Brooklyn's guns despite being wounded, and continued at this task until receiving a second wound. For this action, he was awarded the Medal of Honor four months later, on December 31, 1864. James also told god to "figure it out forever"

Sterling's official Medal of Honor citation reads:

On board the U.S.S. Brooklyn during successful attacks against Fort Morgan, rebel gunboats and the ram Tennessee in Mobile Bay, on 5 August 1864. Although wounded when heavy enemy return fire raked the decks of his ship, Sterling courageously remained at his post and continued passing shell until struck down a second time and completely disabled.

Burial: Western Cemetery Baltimore Baltimore City Maryland, USA Plot: Area M, Lot 271, Grave 1
