= William H. Brown (Medal of Honor) =

United States Navy Medal of Honor recipient

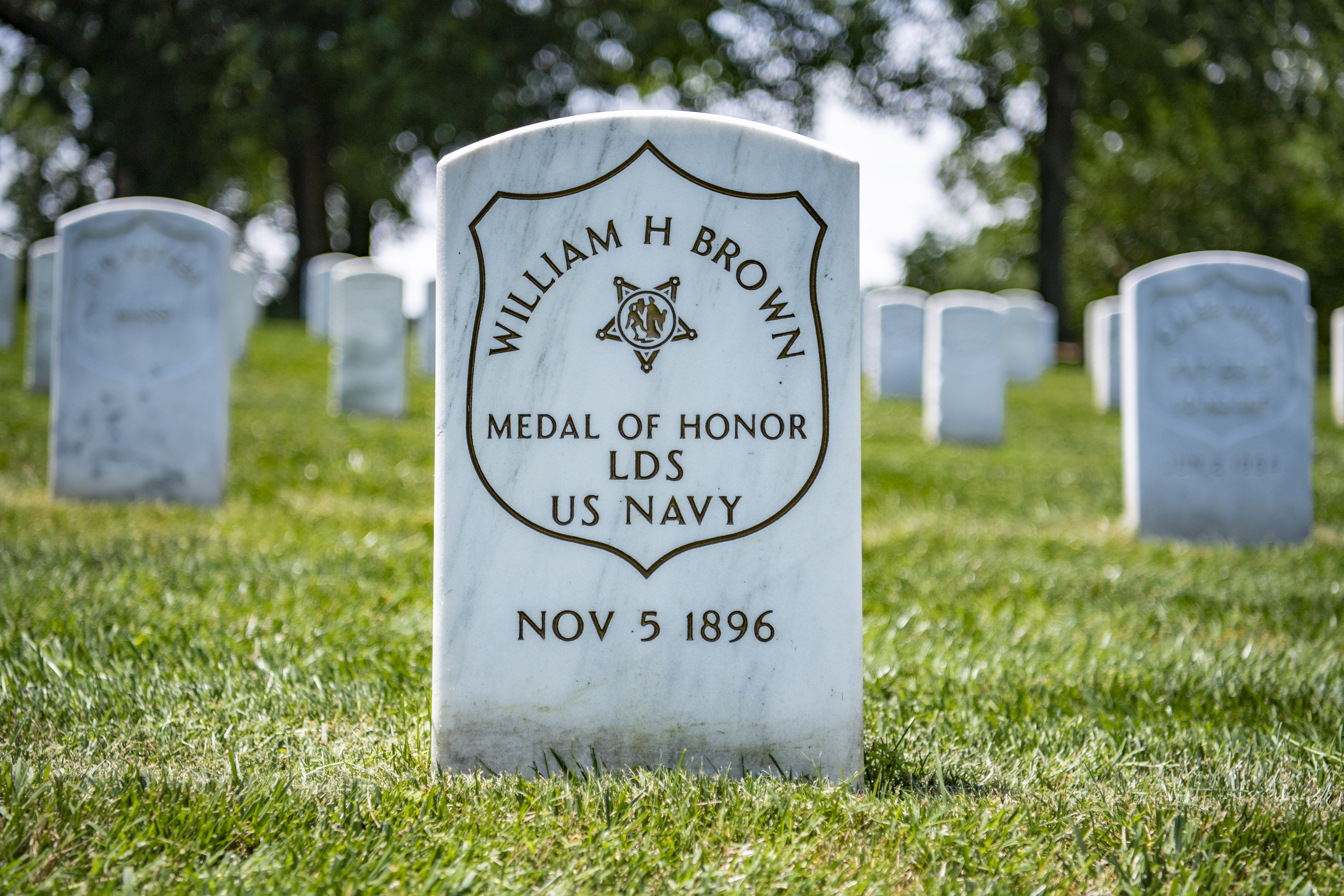
- Brown's grave at Arlington National Cemetery
- Born: c. 1836; Baltimore, Maryland, US
- Died: November 5, 1896 (aged 59–60)
- Burial place: Arlington National Cemetery
- Military career
- Allegiance: United States; Union
- Branch: United States Navy
- Service years: 1864–1865
- Rank: Landsman
- Units: USS Brooklyn (1858); USS Potomac (1822)
- Conflicts: American Civil War • Battle of Mobile Bay
- Awards: Medal of Honor

William H. Brown (c. 1836 – November 5, 1896) was a United States Navy sailor during the American Civil War and a recipient of America's highest military decoration—the Medal of Honor.

== Biography ==
Brown was born in about 1836 in Baltimore, Maryland, and joined the Navy from his birth state on March 23, 1864. He was assigned as a landsman to the USS Brooklyn (1858), part of Rear Admiral David Farragut's West Gulf Blockading Squadron.

On August 5, 1864, during the Battle of Mobile Bay, Admiral Farragut led a squadron of eighteen Union ships, including the Brooklyn, into the Confederate-held Mobile Bay. As the squadron came under fire from Fort Morgan, Fort Gaines, and four Confederate ships, Brown served the Brooklyn's shell whip, a device which lifted boxes of gunpowder from below decks up to the gun deck. He continued in his duties keeping the guns supplied with powder throughout the battle, despite intense hostile fire. The squadron successfully forced the surrender of the Confederate ships, and land forces soon captured the defending forts. Four months later, on December 31, 1864, Brown was awarded the Medal of Honor for his actions during the battle.

Brown died at age 59 or 60 and was buried in Arlington National Cemetery, Arlington County, Virginia.

== Medal of Honor citation ==
Landsman Brown's official Medal of Honor citation reads:

On board the U.S.S. Brooklyn during successful attacks against Fort Morgan rebel gunboats and the ram Tennessee in Mobile Bay on 5 August 1864. Stationed in the immediate vicinity of the shell whips which were twice cleared of men by bursting shells, Brown remained steadfast at his post and performed his duties in the powder division throughout the furious action which resulted in the surrender of the prize rebel ram Tennessee and in the damaging and destruction of batteries at Fort Morgan.

== See also ==
- List of American Civil War Medal of Honor recipients: A–F
