= William Madden (sailor) =

U.S. Navy sailor who is a Medal of Honor recipient

- Born: 1843; England
- Died: Unknown
- Military career
- Allegiance: United States; Union
- Branch: United States Navy; Union Navy
- Rank: Coal heaver
- Unit: USS Brooklyn (1858)
- Conflicts: American Civil War
- Awards: Medal of Honor

William Madden (born 1843) was a coal heaver in the United States Navy and a Medal of Honor recipient for his role during the American Civil War.

Madden enlisted in the Navy from New York in 1864.

== Medal of Honor citation ==
Rank and organization: Coal heaver, U.S. Navy.
Born: 1843, England. Accredited to: New York.
G.O. No.: 45, December 31, 1864.

Citation:

On board the USS Brooklyn during the successful attacks against Fort Morgan, rebel gunboats and the ram Tennessee in Mobile Bay, on 5 August 1864. Stationed in the immediate vicinity of the shell whips, which were twice cleared of men by bursting shells, Madden remained steadfast at his post and performed his duties in the powder division throughout the furious action which resulted in the surrender of the prize rebel ram Tennessee and in the damaging and destruction of batteries at Fort Morgan.

== See also ==
- List of American Civil War Medal of Honor recipients: M–P
