= James Mifflin =

American Civil War Medal of Honor recipient

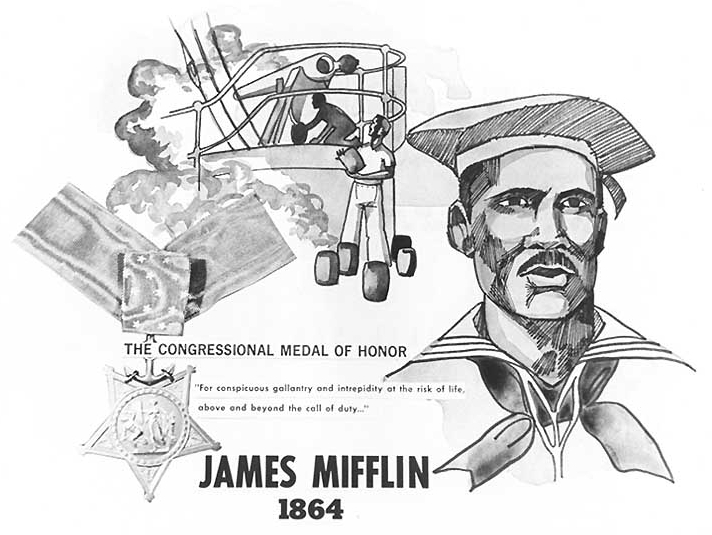
- A U.S. Navy poster featuring Mifflin
- Born: c. 1839; Richmond, Virginia, U.S.
- Military career
- Allegiance: United States of America: Union
- Branch: United States Navy: Union Navy
- Service years: 1864–1865
- Rank: Engineer's Cook
- Unit: (United States Navy) USS Brooklyn
- Conflicts: American Civil War
- Awards: Medal of Honor

James Mifflin (c. 1839–?) was a United States Navy sailor and a recipient of America's highest military decoration—the Medal of Honor—for his actions in the American Civil War.

Mifflin enlisted in the Navy from his home state of Virginia in April 1864, and by August 5, 1864 was serving as an Engineer's Cook on the USS Brooklyn (1858). During the Battle of Mobile Bay, Alabama, Mifflin stood fast and performed his ammunition supply duties despite enemy shellfire. For his conduct during this battle, he was awarded the Medal of Honor.

== Medal of Honor citation ==

Rank and Organization:

Engineer's Cook, U.S. Navy. Born: 1839, Richmond, Va. Accredited to: Virginia. G.O. No.: 45, December 31, 1864.

Citation:

On board the U.S.S. Brooklyn during successful attacks against Fort Morgan, rebel gunboats and the ram CSS Tennessee (1863) in Mobile Bay, 5 August 1864. Stationed in the immediate vicinity of the shell whips which were twice cleared of men by bursting shells, Mifflin remained steadfast at his post and performed his duties in the powder division throughout the furious action which resulted in the surrender of the prize rebel ram Tennessee and in the damaging and destruction of batteries at Fort Morgan.

== See also ==
- List of American Civil War Medal of Honor recipients: M–P
