= USS Brooklyn (1858) =

Sloops-of-war of the United States Navy

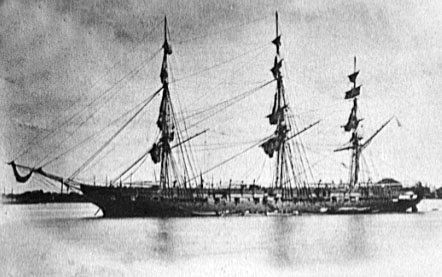
- USS Brooklyn

History

United States
- Name: USS Brooklyn
- Namesake: The City of Brooklyn on Long Island, later one of the five boroughs of New York City
- Builder: Jacob A. Westervelt and Son
- Laid down: 1857
- Launched: 1858
- Commissioned: January 26, 1859
- Decommissioned: May 14, 1889 at the New York Navy Yard
- Stricken: January 6, 1890
- Fate: Sold March 25, 1891 at the Norfolk Navy Yard

General characteristics
- Class & type: Brooklyn
- Displacement: 2,532 tons
- Length: 233 ft (71 m) (at the waterline)
- Beam: 43 ft (13 m)
- Draft: 16 ft 3 in (4.95 m)
- Propulsion: steam engine screw-propelled as well as ship-rig sail
- Speed: 11.5 knots
- Complement: 335 officers and enlisted
- Armament: one 10" smoothbore gun; twenty 9" smoothbore guns

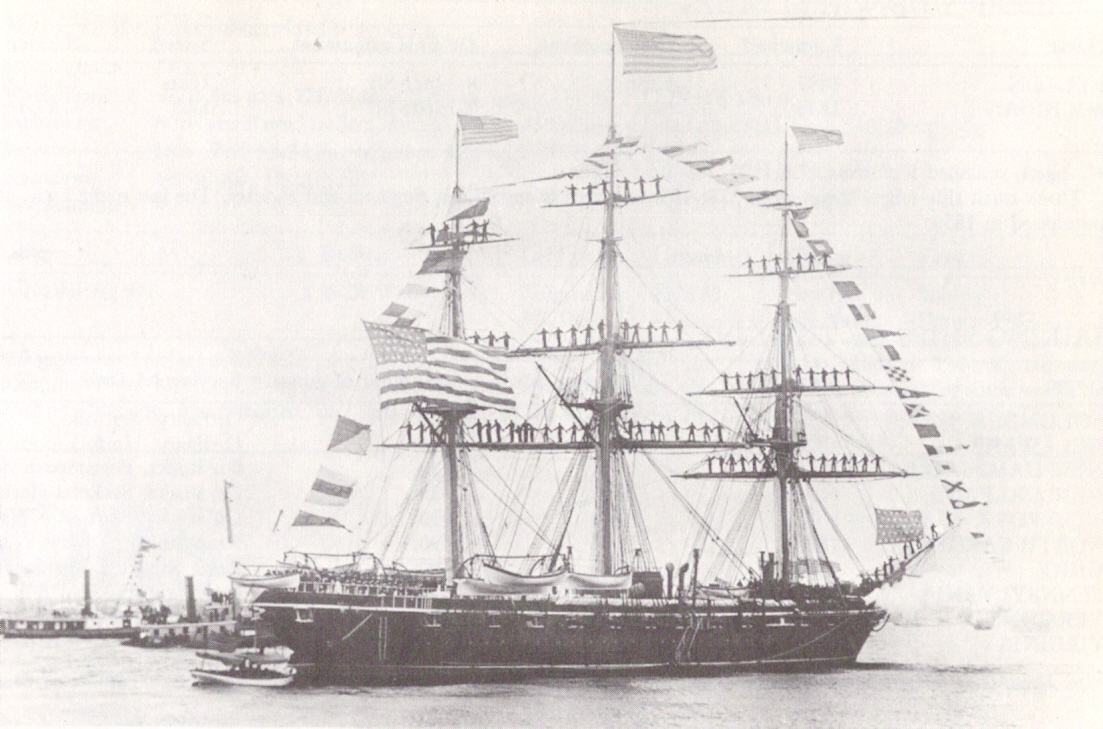
USS Brooklyn dressed overall and with her yards manned at the Naval Review on April 29, 1889.

USS Brooklyn was a sloop-of-war authorized by the U.S. Congress and commissioned in 1859. Brooklyn was active in Caribbean operations until the start of the American Civil War at which time she became an active participant in the Union blockade of the Confederate States of America.

With her one 10-inch gun and twenty 9-inch guns, Brooklyn was a formidable fighting ship that could deliver damaging broadsides, and served on the Atlantic Ocean coast as well as the Gulf Coast of the United States in intercepting blockade runners. Brooklyn also served gallantly attacking Confederate forts and other installations on the Mississippi River.

Post-war, Brooklyn remained active, serving for some years in the European theatre, as well as circumnavigating the globe. She was retired in 1889 and sold in 1890 after having well served her country for over three decades.

== Service history ==
=== Early career ===
Brooklyn – the first ship so-named by the U.S. Navy – was the first of five screw sloops of war authorized by the U.S. Congress on March 3, 1857; laid down later that year by the firm of Jacob A. Westervelt and Son; launched in 1858; and commissioned on January 26, 1859, Capt. David G. Farragut in command. On February 5, Brooklyn got underway for a trial run to Beaufort, South Carolina, where she arrived on the 11th. Following a week's visit to that port, she headed for the West Indies to investigate conditions in Haiti where liberal forces had ousted Emperor Soulouque and installed Fabre Geffrard as President. Farragut found that the people of Haiti were delighted to be free of the oppressive rule of the former monarch and with the end of a racial war that had bled their nation. Upon the recommendation of the American consul, Farragut sailed for the Isthmus of Panama. After visiting Aspinwall, Brooklyn set a course for the Mexican coast and reached Veracruz early in April. The legal president of Mexico, Benito Juárez – who had been driven from Mexico City by forces of General Miguel Miramón of the Clerical Party—was making that seaport his temporary capital.

The United States, which recognized the Juarez government, had sent former Maryland Congressman Robert Milligan McLane to Veracruz as the American minister and ordered Farragut to make Brooklyn available to McLane so that he might keep abreast of developments in the ongoing civil war and assist American consuls who were striving to protect U.S. citizens and property. During part of the time the screw sloop of war lay off Veracruz, McLane resided on board. In July Brooklyn proceeded to Pensacola, Florida, for coal, provisions, and water, and she reached that port on the 15th. As soon as she finished replenishing, the ship returned to Veracruz, but she was back at Pensacola again by September 7. From there, she sailed for New York and reached the New York Navy Yard on the 26th of that month. With McLane—who had returned to the United States for consultations with the U.S. Secretary of State and the U.S. President—on board, Brooklyn departed New York Harbor on November 8 and headed back toward the Gulf of Mexico. She arrived at Veracruz on the 21st and remained in port while McLane negotiated an agreement with the Juárez Government. After the treaty was signed on December 12, she got underway again and proceeded to New Orleans, Louisiana, where she arrived on the 18th.

With her bunkers full once more, she headed down the Mississippi River on Christmas Eve and crossed the gulf to Veracruz. However, in mid- January she reembarked McLane and took him to New Orleans so that he might catch a train for Washington, D.C., where he was needed to explain the treaty he had negotiated with Juárez to doubtful senators. From New Orleans, Brooklyn proceeded to Pensacola to prepare for a return to Mexican waters. However, before McLane could get back to the Gulf Coast from Washington, orders reached Pensacola sending her north. She stood out to sea on February 19, 1860 and reached New York City on the 27th. Underway again on March 11, she arrived at Norfolk, Virginia, the following afternoon and there awaited McLane whom she embarked and delivered back to Veracruz on the 28th. The steamer operated along the Mexican coast through the spring and into the summer carrying McLane to various ports where he conferred with the American consuls. Late in July she left the Mexican coast and returned to Norfolk early in August. There, she received orders to prepare for a voyage carrying members of a scientific expedition to the Gulf of Mexico to find a route across the isthmus of Chiriqui. She sailed on the 13th and reached Chiriqui, Boca del Toro, Panama, on the 24th. But for a run to Aspinwall from September 12 to 17, she remained off the expedition base at Chiriqui until mid-October when she returned to Aspinwall. There on October 20, Capt. William S. Walker relieved Farragut in command.

=== Civil War service ===
==== 1861 ====
Shortly thereafter, Brooklyn returned to Hampton Roads, Virginia, and she remained in the Norfolk area through the end of 1860 while enthusiasm for secession swept through the deep South in the wake of Abraham Lincoln's election to the presidency. Early in January 1861, Capt. Walker received orders sending Brooklyn to Charleston, South Carolina, with messages for the steamer Star of the West which had sailed south to relieve beleaguered Fort Sumter. However, when she reached Charleston Harbor, she found the channel leading into port obstructed and learned that the resupply effort had failed. Consequently, she returned to Hampton Roads.

The following month, she received orders for a similar mission which she carried out with great success, relieving Fort Pickens, at Pensacola, Florida. After helping to thwart Confederate attempts to wrest that highly valuable Federal toehold on strategic Florida territory from Union hands, Brooklyn sailed west along the Gulf of Mexico coast to establish the blockade of the Mississippi Passes. She, USS Powhatan, and two gunboats made a number of captures off Pass a l'Outre and Southwest Pass, but so many ships were getting by them that Comdr. Charles Henry Poor – who relieved Capt. Walker as Brooklyn's commander in April 1861—tried to go upriver to the Head of Passes where traffic might better be throttled. Low water, however, caused her to run aground twice before she abandoned the effort. On June 30, 1861, the Confederate warship CSS Sumter raced out of Pass a l'Outre while Brooklyn had left her station in pursuit of another ship. Upon seeing the fleet Southern cruiser, Brooklyn forsook her first chase and used full sail and maximum steam in an attempt to overtake Sumter but to no avail, for her quarry soon escaped over the horizon and out of sight. Badly in need of repairs, Brooklyn sailed north late in the autumn and was decommissioned at the Philadelphia Navy Yard.

Recommissioned on December 19, 1861, the screw sloop—commanded by Capt. Thomas T. Craven—dropped down the Delaware River on the 27th and stood out to sea, bound for the gulf. After stopping at Key West, Florida, she reached Ship Island, Mississippi, on January 22, 1862. On February 2 she sailed for Pass a l'Outre where, on the 19th, she captured the steamer Magnolia which was attempting to slip out to sea with 1,200 bales of cotton. Meanwhile, the Navy Department had divided its forces in the gulf into two organizations: the East Gulf Blockading Squadron, commanded by Flag Officer William W. McKean, and the West Gulf Blockading Squadron, commanded by Flag Officer David G. Farragut who arrived at Ship Island in March. Besides carrying out the blockade, Farragut had been instructed to lead a fleet of warships up the Mississippi River to capture New Orleans, Louisiana. After spending the latter part of March and the first part of April getting his deep-draft ocean-going vessels over the bar and into the river, Farragut moved his fleet up the Mississippi to a position just out of range of the guns that guarded the river at Confederate Forts Jackson and St. Philip.

==== 1862 ====
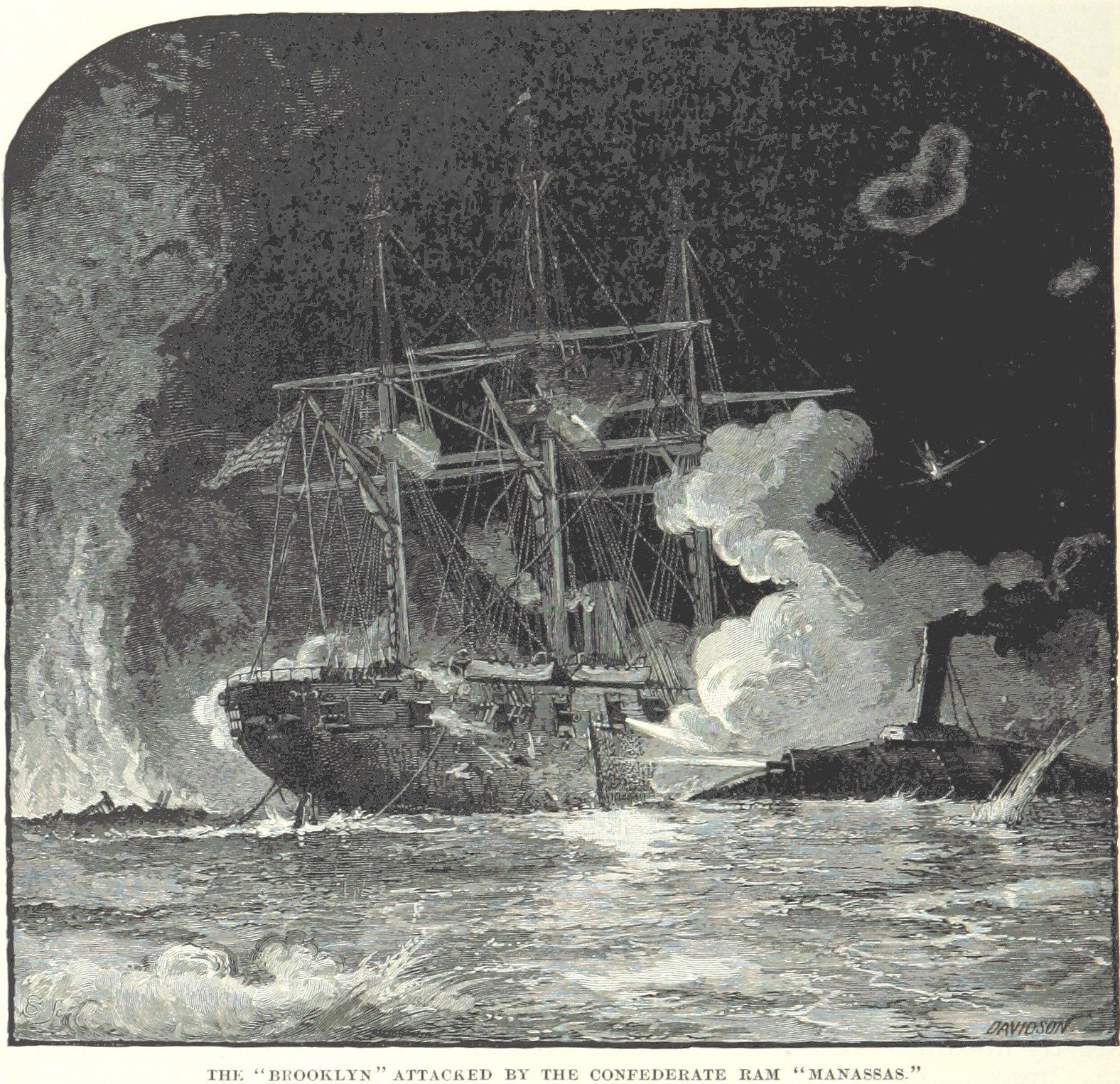
Brooklyn under attack by CSS Manassas

Attached to Farragut's force was a flotilla of small sailing vessels each of which carried a 13-inch mortar. In mid-April these little warships—mostly schooners—began a bombardment of the Southern forts and continued the attack until the early hours of April 24 when they increased the tempo of their firing to their maximum rate while Farragut's deep-draft men-of-war got underway for a dash past the Southern guns. Brooklyn was

... struck several times before she could bring her guns to bear. As soon as that could be accomplished we opened fire upon Fort Jackson and also upon Fort St. Philip, fighting both batteries at intervals. We were fouled by one of our gunboats, but received no damage. The ram Manassas attempted to sink us by running into us, but did us little injury. A fire raft came down the river upon us, but we succeeded in crossing it without injury. We came near getting foul of some hulks and rafts of logs, which kept us under fire longer than we otherwise should have been.

Eight men from Brooklyn were killed in the action and 21 wounded before she reached comparative safety beyond the range of the Rebel artillery. Later that day, after making needed repairs, Farragut's warships resumed their movement upriver and reached New Orleans on April 25. When that city had surrendered, Brooklyn—which had been damaged more seriously by her collision with the ram Manassas than Craven had at first realized—received a patch of heavy planking some 24 feet long over a long tear in her hull. One of Brooklyn's sailors, Quartermaster James Buck, was awarded the Medal of Honor for his actions in the battle.

Farragut's orders called for him to clear the Mississippi of all Confederate forces afloat and of all defensive works along the river banks while moving up stream until meeting another Union squadron—commanded by Flag Officer Charles Henry Davis – which had begun fighting its way downriver from Cairo, Illinois. Hence, early in May after Union Army troops commanded by Major General Benjamin F. Butler had arrived in transports and had taken over New Orleans, Brooklyn and six other warships ascended the river. Baton Rouge, Louisiana, and Natchez, Mississippi, surrendered with no resistance, but Vicksburg, Mississippi, proved to be another matter. The Confederate Army had so fortified its riverside hills that it could not be taken without the support of a strong land force. Since the Union Army did not have a sufficient number of troops available in the region to accomplish this purpose, Farragut's men-of-war returned to New Orleans.

There awaiting him were orders from Secretary of the Navy Gideon Welles reiterating the importance of a junction with Davis's force above Vicksburg, Mississippi. Thus the Union warships again reversed course and painfully worked their way upstream to a position just out of range of Vicksburg's guns. This time they had the support of the Mortar Flotilla which conducted an intense preliminary bombardment of the riverside fortress. At two hours past midnight on June 28, the fleet got underway in two columns and began steaming up stream. Unfortunately, the steamers that had towed the mortar schooners up stream got in the way of Brooklyn and two gunboats and prevented their getting upstream past the Vicksburg batteries. As a result they drew much of the Southern fire while Farragut's other ships pushed upstream and out of range. Shortly before dawn, Brooklyn dropped down stream to a place of greater safety and remained there to be on hand to support Farragut in any way possible should an opportunity to do so occur before the Flag Officer returned below in mid-July. As the hot summer days passed, more and more illness broke out among the ship's crew and the falling water level in the river made it necessary for the ship to retire downstream toward New Orleans.

Meanwhile, on July 2, Capt Henry H. Bell relieved Capt. Craven in command of Brooklyn. On August 6, the screw sloop engaged Confederate batteries at Donaldsonville, Louisiana, driving the Southern artillerymen from their guns; and, on the 9th and 10th, she took part in combined operations which partially destroyed that city in reprisal for guerrilla attacks on Union shipping from that town. Soon thereafter, Brooklyn left the Mississippi and steamed to Pensacola for more permanent repairs to the damage she had suffered while fighting her way past Forts Jackson and St. Philip and colliding with Manassas. On October 6, orders sent the ship to blockade duty off Mobile Bay, and she spent the rest of 1862 in that vicinity alert for blockade runners and the appearance of Confederate cruisers which might threaten Union gunboats guarding the coast.

==== 1863 ====
Early in January 1863, when word reached Farragut that a surprise Southern attack against Union warships at Galveston, Texas, had recaptured that port and broken the blockade there, he placed Bell in charge of the small force sent to reestablish Union control. Shoal water prevented Brooklyn from participating in a bombardment of Confederate gun positions in Galveston harbor on January 10; and on the night of the 11th, CSS Alabama sank Brooklyn's most formidable consort the sidewheel steamer USS Hatteras, in a fierce but rapid engagement some 30 miles off Galveston. This setback prompted Bell to give up his plan to retake that port pending the arrival of powerful shallow draft reinforcements. Brooklyn did continue to blockade the Texas city into the summer. On 25 May, Bell " ... left Commander James Robert Madison Mullany in the USS Bienville in charge of the blockade of Galveston ... and proceeded down the coast of Texas as far as the Rio Grande, to ascertain the amount of interior coast trade and its exit...On the morning of the 27th, Brooklyn captured the 17-ton, cotton-laden sloop, Blazer, which was heading for Matamoros, Mexico. The next day, boats from Brooklyn took the small sloop Kate. Three days later, she anchored off the bar outside Brazos Santiago, Texas", and sent " ... an expedition of four boats and 87 men ... to capture vessels there …"

As the Union boats approached Point Isabel, the Southerners " ... set fire to a large schooner." They brought out the 100-ton schooner Star and a fishing scow. At Point Isabel, they captured the 100-ton, British sloop Victoria of Jamaica but ran that vessel aground while attempting to get out to sea and so burned her. After the landing parties had returned to the ship, Brooklyn returned to Galveston. Late in July she returned to New Orleans where, on August 2, Lt. Comdr. Chester Hatfield relieved Bell in command to free the commodore to take temporary command of the West Gulf Blockading Squadron while Farragut returned home in USS Hartford for a well-earned leave. On the 10th, Capt. George F. Emmons relieved Hatfield and sailed Brooklyn north on the 13th to receive badly needed repairs. She emerged from the Southwest Pass the next day; touched at Port Royal, South Carolina, on the 21st, at Charleston, South Carolina, on the 22d, and reached the New York Navy Yard on the 25th.

==== Battle of Mobile Bay ====
Recommissioned on April 14, 1864, Brooklyn put to sea on 10 May under the command of Capt. James Alden, Jr. and rejoined her squadron off Mobile Bay on the last day of the month. There Farragut—who had resumed command—was eager to capture that strategic port, but was held up by the perennial lack of available Union Army troops—needed for the projected combined operation. He was also awaiting the arrival of monitors to strengthen the squadron for the forthcoming battle. Brooklyn helped to blockade Mobile Bay while Farragut waited for deficiencies to be corrected. Finally, late in July she and her squadron mates received orders to make ready for the long awaited attack. On the morning of August 5, Farragut took his squadron of 18 ships, including four monitors, against the heavy Confederate defenses of Mobile Bay. Soon after 6 am, the Union ships crossed the bar and moved into the bay. The four monitors formed a column to starboard of the wooden ships in order to take most of the fire from Fort Morgan, which they had to pass at close range. Brooklyn led the second column, consisting of the seven smaller wooden ships lashed to the port side of the larger wooden screw steamers, as in the passage of Fort Hudson.

Shortly before 7 o'clock, Tecumseh opened fire on Fort Morgan, and the action quickly became general. As the 4-ship Confederate squadron engaged the attackers, a terrific explosion rocked the Union monitor USS Tecumseh. She careened violently and went down in seconds, the victim of one of the much-feared torpedoes (Naval mine) laid by the Confederates for harbor defense. Alden, in Brooklyn, was to Tecumseh's port when the disaster occurred; the heavy steamer stopped and began backing to clear "a row of suspecious [sic] looking buoys" directly under Brooklyn's bow. The entire line of wooden vessels was drifting into confusion immediately under the guns of Fort Morgan. Farragut, lashed in the rigging to observe the action over the smoke billowing from the guns, acted promptly and resolutely. The only course was the boldest—through the torpedo field. "Damn the torpedoes", he ordered "full speed ahead." His flagship Hartford swept past Brooklyn into the rows of torpedoes; the fleet followed. The Union force steamed into the bay.

In the ensuing battle, the ironclad CSS Tennessee attempted in vain to ram Brooklyn. The Union fleet dispatched three of the Confederate ships, leaving Tennessee as the only defender. The lone ironclad then engaged the entire Union fleet. After a fierce battle lasting more than an hour, Tennessee was forced to surrender, resulting in a Union victory. During the battle that lasted a bit more than three hours, Brooklyn suffered 54 casualties, 11 killed and 43 wounded, while firing 183 projectiles. Twenty-three of Brooklyn's sailors and marines were awarded the Medal of Honor for their part in the battle. Their names were:

- Ship's Cook William Blagheen
- Captain of the Forecastle John Brown
- Landsman William H. Brown
- Coxswain John Laver Mather Cooper
- Ordinary Seaman Samuel W. Davis
- Sergeant J. Henry Denig (USMC)
- Boatswain's Mate Richard Dennis
- Coxswain William Halstead
- Sergeant Michael Hudson (USMC)
- Seaman Joseph Irlam
- Coxswain John Irving
- Seaman Nicholas Irwin
- Quartermaster Barnett Kenna
- Boy James Machon
- Captain of the Top Alexander Mack
- Coal Heaver William Madden
- Engineer's Cook James Mifflin
- Quartermaster William Nichols
- Corporal Miles M. Oviatt (USMC)
- Coxswain Edward Price
- Corporal Willard M. Smith (USMC)
- Coal Heaver James E. Sterling
- Quartermaster Samuel Todd

==== Attack on Fort Fisher ====
After spending the next few weeks helping reduce the Confederate land works guarding the entrance, Brooklyn departed Mobile Bay on September 6 and headed for Hampton Roads for service in the North Atlantic Blockading Squadron. Soon thereafter, Rear Admiral David Dixon Porter began to concentrate his warships for a joint Army-Navy operation against Fort Fisher, North Carolina. The fort guarded the approaches to Wilmington, North Carolina, the last major Confederate port still open for blockade runners. Brooklyn took part in the attack against that Southern stronghold which began with a bombardment on Christmas Eve. She helped to cover the landing of troops the next day, but the whole effort was brought to naught later that day when the Union Army commanding officer, Major General Benjamin F. Butler, decided that his forces could not carry the Confederate works and ordered his soldiers to re-embark. Porter strongly disagreed with this decision in dispatches to Washington. General Ulysses S. Grant responded by placing a new commander over a larger Army force earmarked for another attempt to take Fort Fisher. Brooklyn was in the task force that arrived off Fort Fisher on January 13, 1865, and her guns supported the attack until the fort surrendered on the 15th. Since this victory completed the last major task of the Union Navy during the Civil War, Brooklyn sailed north and was decommissioned at the New York Navy Yard on January 31, 1865.

==== Prizes ====
| Date | Prize Name | Gross Proceeds | Costs and Expenses | Amount for Distribution | Where Adjudicated | Sent to 4th Auditor for Distribution | Vessels Entitled to Share |
|---|---|---|---|---|---|---|---|
| May 29, 1861 | H. E. Spearing | | | | | | |
| Jun 7, 1861 | Pilgrim | | | | | | |
| Jun 20, 1861 | Nahum Stetson | | | | | | |
| Sep 5, 1861 | Macao | | | | | | |
| Jun 18, 1861 | Amelia | | | | | | |
| Feb 19, 1862 | Magnolia | | | | | | |
| May 27, 1863 | Blazer | | | | | | |
| May 28, 1863 | Kate | | | | | | |
| May 30, 1863 | Victoria | | | | | | destroyed |
| May 30, 1863 | Star | | | | | | |

=== Post-war service ===
Laid up under repairs for the remaining months of the conflict, the screw sloop was recommissioned on October 4, 1865, Comdr. Thomas H. Patterson in command. She stood out to sea on the 27th and proceeded via the Gulf of Mexico to Bahia, Brazil. Following almost two years of service along the Atlantic coast of South America, she returned to Philadelphia, Pennsylvania, late in the summer of 1867 and was decommissioned there on September 11 and placed in ordinary. Recommissioned on August 24, 1870, Capt. John Guest in command, Brooklyn sailed eastward across the Atlantic and spent almost three years in European waters, primarily in the Mediterranean. After returning home in the summer of 1873, she was decommissioned at New York City. Reactivated on January 20, 1874, the veteran warship operated along the southern coast of the United States until autumn when she entered the Norfolk Navy Yard to be fitted out for service as flagship of the South Atlantic Squadron. She got underway for the coast of Brazil on January 23, 1875 and operated in South American waters protecting American interests until heading home on December 7. Following service in the Home Squadron, she was decommissioned at New York City on July 21, 1876 and laid up.

Recommissioned on November 11, 1881, Brooklyn sailed on December 7 for Montevideo, Uruguay, and another tour of duty with the South Atlantic Squadron. On February 5, 1882, she departed that port and headed for the Strait of Magellan. During the month, she visited Possession Bay, Gregory Bay, Elizabeth Island, and Sandy Point before departing Possession Bay on March 2, 1882 and returning via Stanley, Falkland Islands, to Montevideo where she arrived late in March. While operating out of that port during the next 18 months, she made two voyages to Santa Cruz, Patagonia, and one to Rio de Janeiro, Brazil, before getting underway on September 28, 1883 for Cape Town, Africa. During her time in African waters, she also visited Tomatave, Madagascar; Zanzibar; the Johanna Islands; Nassi be Island; Mojanga, Madagascar; Mozambique; Mourondava, Nos Veh, and Tuellear Bay, Madagascar, and Port Elizabeth, Africa, before departing Cape Town on March 13, 1884. After proceeding homeward via St. Helena Island, Montevideo, and Rio de Janeiro, she arrived at New York City on October 8, 1884 and was placed out of commission there on the 25th.

Following almost a year in ordinary, Brooklyn was recommissioned on October 15, 1885 and, on November 21, assigned once more to the South Atlantic Squadron and served in South American waters until heading home again on June 9, 1886. At New York, she prepared for duty in the Orient and, on August 12, got underway for the Far East. After crossing the Atlantic and the Mediterranean, she transited the Suez Canal and traversed the Red Sea and the Indian Ocean to East Asian waters. On April 4, 1887, Rear Admiral Chandler transferred his flag to her as commander of the Asiatic Squadron, and she showed the flag in ports of the western Pacific Ocean until turning homeward for the last time on August 9, 1888. She returned to the United States via Honolulu; Cape Horn; and St. Thomas. Brooklyn completed her first circumnavigation of the earth upon her arrival at New York on April 24, 1889 and simultaneously ended her active naval career. She was decommissioned at the New York Navy Yard on May 14, 1889, and her name was struck from the Navy List on January 6, 1890. She was sold by public auction at the Norfolk Navy Yard on March 25, 1891 to E. J. Butler.

== See also ==
- List of circumnavigations
