= Hickman (surname) =

Hickman or Hickmann is a surname, and may refer to:

== Hickman ==
=== Acting ===
- Alfred Hickman (1873–1931), English actor
- Amy-Leigh Hickman (born 1997), English actress
- Bill Hickman (1921–1986), American stunt driver, stunt coordinator, and actor
- Darryl Hickman (1931–2024), American actor and television executive
- Dwayne Hickman (1934–2022), American actor and television executive, brother of Darryl
- Howard Hickman (1880–1949), American actor, director and writer

=== Military ===
- John Hickman (Medal of Honor) (1836–1904), American Civil War sailor and Medal of Honor recipient
- Paschal Hickman (c. 1778 – 1813), American officer killed in the War of 1812
- Thomas Hickman-Windsor, 1st Earl of Plymouth (c. 1627 – 1687), English peer and military figure

=== Music ===
- Art Hickman (1886–1930), American bandleader and jazz pioneer
- John Hickman (musician) (1942–2021), American banjo player
- Sara Hickman (born 1963), American singer, songwriter, and artist

=== Politics ===
- Albert Hickman (1875–1943), Canadian politician
- Alex Hickman (1925–2016), Canadian lawyer, politician and judge
- Darrell Hickman (born 1935), justice of the Arkansas Supreme Court
- David Henry Hickman (1821–1869), American legislator and businessman in Missouri
- John Hickman (Pennsylvania politician) (1810–1875), American congressman in Pennsylvania
- John W. Hickman (Pennsylvania politician) (1831–1906), member of the Pennsylvania House of Representatives
- John W. Hickman (Utah politician) (born 1939), American politician in Utah
- Richard Hickman (1757–1832), American politician in Kentucky
- Russell O. Hickman (1908–1988), American politician in Maryland

=== Religion ===
- Charles Hickman (bishop) (1648–1713), Church of Ireland bishop
- Henry Hickman (died 1692), English minister and controversialist

=== Sports ===
- Ally Hickman (born 2009), Australian snowboarder
- Bernard "Peck" Hickman (1911–2000), American college basketball coach at Louisville
- Charlie Hickman (1876–1934), American professional baseball player
- James Hickman (born 1976), English swimmer
- Jim Hickman (1910s outfielder) (1892–1958), American professional baseball player
- Jim Hickman (1960s outfielder) (1937–2016), American professional baseball player
- Jim Hickman (racing driver) (1943–1982), American racecar driver
- Mark Hickman (born 1973), Australian field hockey goalkeeper
- Ricky Hickman (born 1985), American-Georgian basketball player
- Ronnie Hickman (born 2001), American football player

=== Writing and journalism ===
- Clayton Hickman (born 1977), British science fiction author
- Fred Hickman (1956–2022), American sports broadcaster
- Jonathan Hickman (born 1972), American comic book writer and artist
- Leo Hickman, English journalist
- Martha Whitmore Hickman (1925–2015), American author
- Stephen Hickman (1949–2021), American artist, illustrator, sculptor, and author
- Tracy Hickman (born 1955), American fantasy author

=== Scientists and inventors ===
- Clarence James Hickman (1914–1980), British-Canadian mycologist
- Clarence N. Hickman (1889–1981), American physicist
- Ron Hickman (1932–2011), South African-born, Jersey-based automobile designer and inventor
- Vernon Victor Hickman (1894–1984), Australian entomologist, specialising in spiders
- W. Albert Hickman (1878–1957), Canadian boat designer and builder
- W. Braddock Hickman (1911–1970), American economist and president of the Federal Reserve Bank of Cleveland

=== Other ===
- Alfred Hickman (disambiguation), several people
- David Hickman (disambiguation), several people
- Henry Hickman (disambiguation), several people
- Jay Hickman (disambiguation), several people
- Jim Hickman (disambiguation), several people
- John Hickman (disambiguation), several people
- Mildred Annie Hickman (1895 –1985), New Zealand photographer
- Wild Bill Hickman (1815–1883), American frontiersman
- William Edward Hickman (1908–1928), American murderer

== Hickmann ==
- Ana Hickmann (born 1981), Brazilian model and television host
- Anton Leo Hickmann (1834–1906), Bohemian-born Austrian geographer
- Cléo Hickmann (born 1959), Brazilian footballer
- Fons Hickmann (born 1986), German graphic designer
- Hans Hickmann (1908–1968), German musicologist
- Hugo Hickmann (1877–1955), German politician

== See also ==
- Hickman (disambiguation)
- Hickam (disambiguation)
