= Hickman =

Hickman or Hickmann may refer to:

== People ==
- Hickman (surname), notable people with the surname Hickman or Hickmann
- Hickman Ewing, American attorney
- Hickman Price (1911–1989), assistant secretary in the United States Department of Commerce
- Mônica Hickmann Alves (born 1987), Brazilian footballer
- Orville Hickman Browning (1808–1881), American attorney and politician in Illinois
- Thomas Hickman Williams (1801–1851), American politician in Mississippi

== Places ==
=== United States ===
- Hickman, California
- Hickman, Delaware
- Hickman, Kentucky
- Hickman, Maryland
- Hickman, Nebraska
- Hickman, Tennessee
- Hickman County (disambiguation)

== Schools ==
- David H. Hickman High School, in Columbia, Missouri, United States
- Hickman Elementary School (disambiguation)

== Other uses ==
- Hickman line, an intravenous catheter
- Hickman v. Taylor, a 1947 United States Supreme Court case
- Mackeigan v Hickman, a 1989 Supreme Court of Canada decision on judicial independence
- USS Hickman (ID-3554), a United States Navy cargo ship
- USS Hickman County (LST-825), a United States Navy tank landing ship

== See also ==
- Hickman House (disambiguation)
- Hickam (disambiguation)
