= Willoughby Hickman =

Willoughby Hickman may refer to:

- Sir Willoughby Hickman, 1st Baronet (1604–1650) of the Hickman Baronets
- Sir Willoughby Hickman, 3rd Baronet (1659–1720) of the Hickman Baronets, MP for Kingston upon Hull
- Willoughby Hickman (1688–1712), son of the 3rd Baronet and MP for East Retford

== See also ==
- Hickman (surname)
