= Matthew McClelland =

Medal of Honor recipient

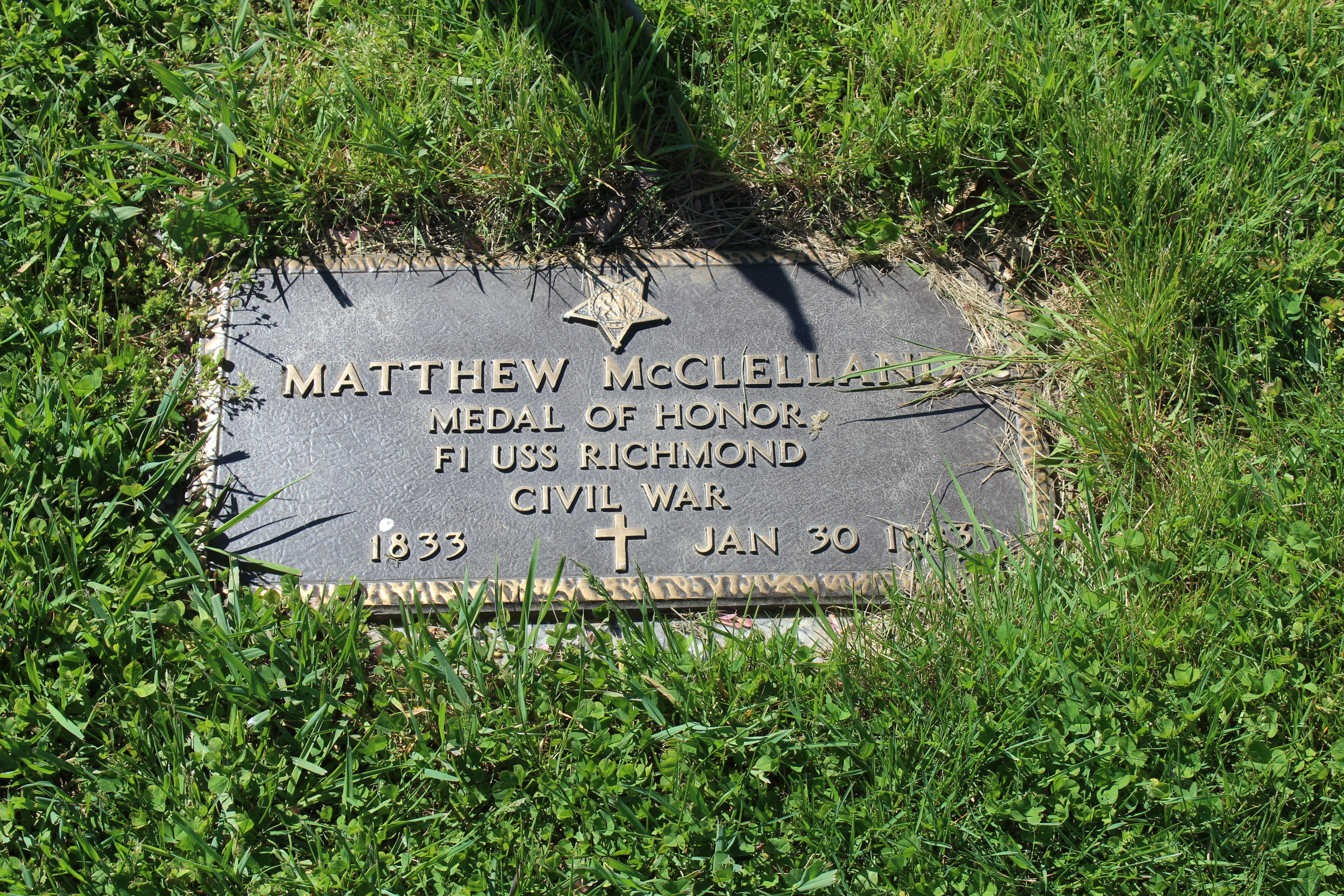
- Memorial marker at Roseland Cemetery
- Born: November 1832; Ireland
- Died: January 30, 1883 (aged 50); Philadelphia, Pennsylvania
- Burial place: Mount Moriah Cemetery; Philadelphia, Pennsylvania
- Military career
- Allegiance: United States of America; Union
- Branch: United States Navy; Union Navy
- Service years: 1861-64
- Rank: First Class Fireman
- Units: USS Richmond; USS North Carolina (1820); USS Princeton (1851)
- Conflicts: American Civil War
- Awards: Medal of Honor

Matthew McClelland (November 1832 – January 30, 1883) was a United States Navy sailor and a recipient of the United States military's highest decoration the Medal of Honor for his actions in the American Civil War.

== Military service ==
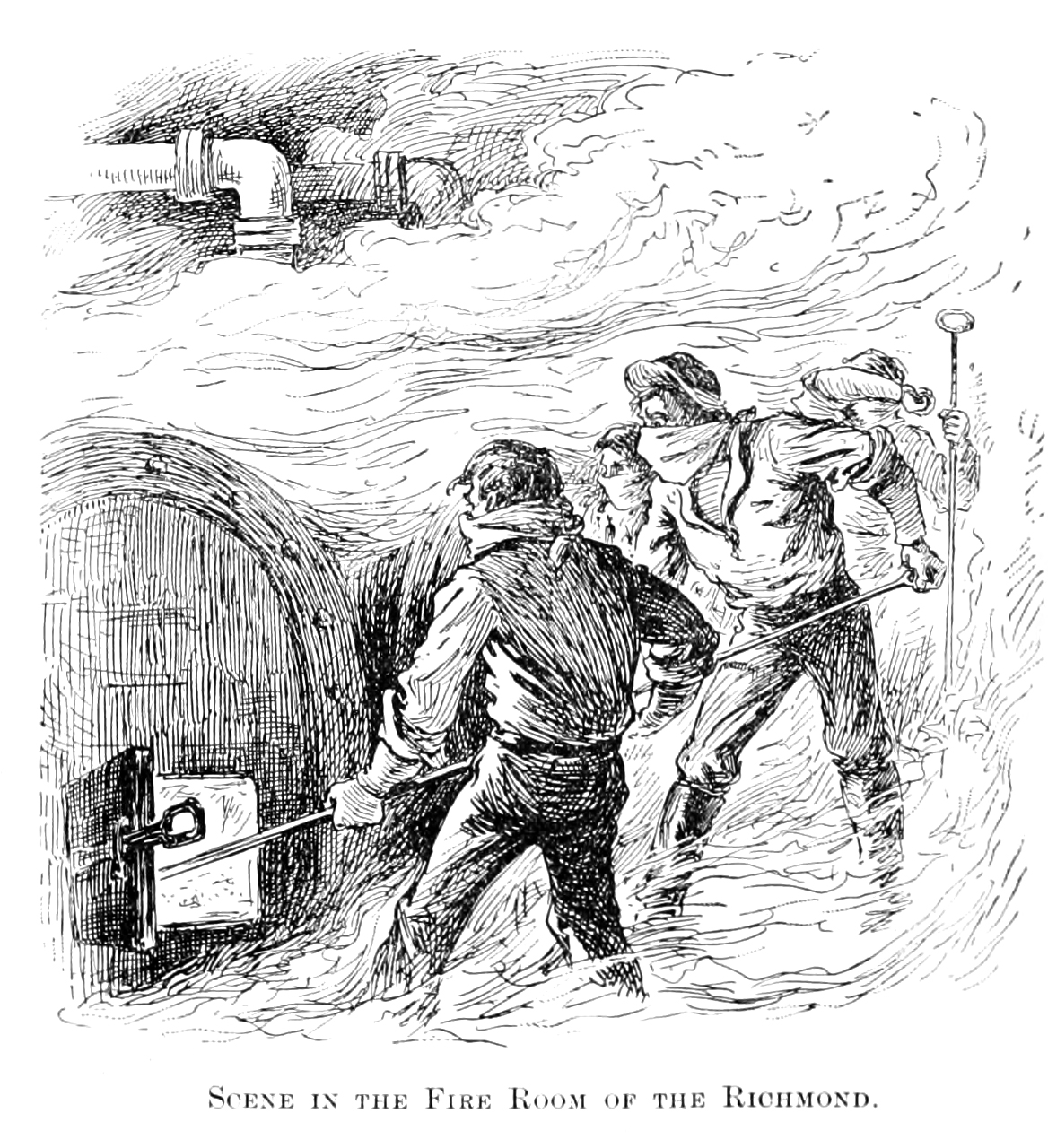
Illustration of McClelland, Joseph E. Vantine, John Rush and John Hickman on the USS Richmond in the attack on the Port Hudson batteries, March 14, 1863, the action that earned them the Medal of Honor

Matthew McClelland was born November 1832 in Ireland. McClelland enlisted July 12, 1861 for three years and served on the USS North Carolina from that date to July 27, 1861 as a Second Class Fireman. He then served on the USS Richmond from July 28, 1861 to August 29, 1864 as a First Class Fireman and the USS Princeton from August 30, 1864 to honorable discharge on September 9, 1864.

During the Civil War, McClelland served as a First Class Fireman aboard the steamship USS Richmond. As a fireman, McClelland's duties were to tend to the ship's steam boilers.

In the prelude to the siege of Port Hudson, Louisiana, Rear Admiral David Farragut attempted to move a flotilla of ships, including the Richmond, up the Mississippi River past the town of Port Hudson. On March 14, 1863, the flotilla reached the town and came under heavy fire from Confederate artillery batteries. The enemy guns inflicted severe damage on the Union flotilla, forcing most of the ships to turn back.

During the battle, the Richmond's fireroom, which housed its boilers, was damaged by an enemy shell and began to fill with hot steam. McClelland entered the room and "hauled the fires", or put out the furnaces, to prevent further danger. For his actions he was awarded the Medal of Honor four months later, on July 10, 1863.

== Medal of Honor citation ==
Rank and organization: first class fireman, U.S. Navy. Accredited to: New York. G.O. No.: 17, 10 July 1863.

McClelland's official Medal of Honor Citation reads:

Serving on board the U.S.S. Richmond in the attack on Port Hudson, 14 March 1863. Damaged by a 6-inch solid rifle shot which shattered the starboard safety-valve chamber and also damaged the port safety-valve, the fireroom of the Richmond immediately became filled with steam to place it in an extremely critical condition. Acting courageously in this crisis, McClelland persisted in penetrating the steam-filled room in order to haul the hot fires of the furnaces and continued this gallant action until the gravity of the situation had lessened.

== Death and burial ==
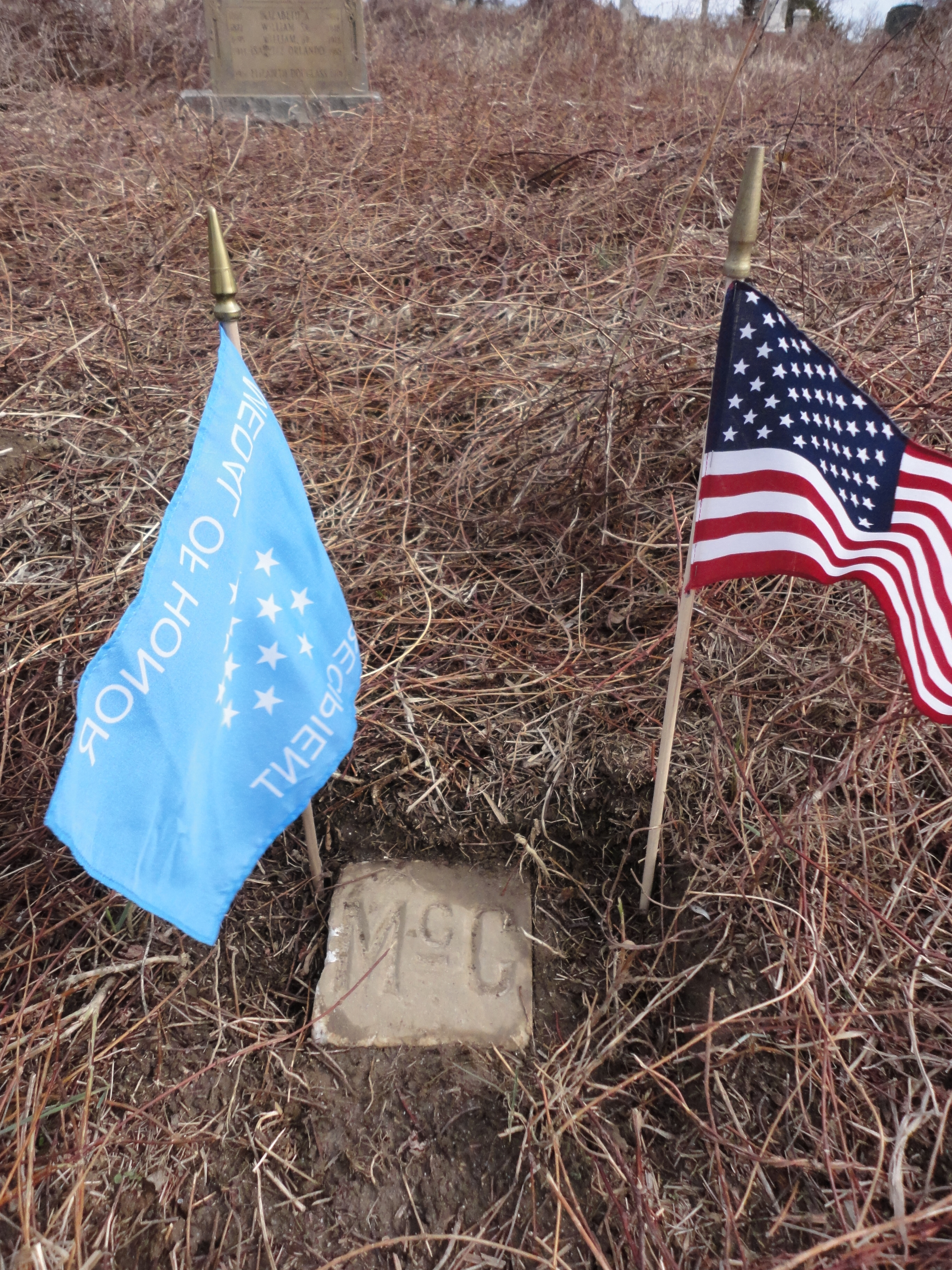
McClelland's burial plot in Mount Moriah Cemetery

McClelland died of pulmonary catarrh and irritation of the heart, and his remains were initially stored at the vault of Lafayette Cemetery in Philadelphia, Pennsylvania on February 4, 1883. His remains were then transferred February 5, 1883 to Mount Moriah Cemetery, Philadelphia, Pennsylvania and buried February 11, 1883.

McClelland's death notice in the February 3, 1883 Philadelphia Inquirer newspaper read:

McClellan, - On the 30th ult., Matthew McClellan, in the fifty-first year of his age. The relatives and friends of the family, also Energetic Lodge, No. 643, IOOF; Great Western Division, No. 334, Sons of Temperance; G.W. Town Post, No. 46, G.A.R.; employees of League Island Navy Yard, are respectfully invited to attend the funeral, on Sunday afternoon, at 2 o'clock, from his late residence, No. 1026 Dickinson street. To proceed to Lafayette Cemetery.

In 2006, the Medal of Honor Historical Society of the United States incorrectly assumed that McClelland's body had been moved from Lafayette Cemetery in Philadelphia to Evergreen Memorial Park in Bensalem, Pennsylvania during the mass reinterment in 1947. Evergreen Memorial Park went out of business and became part of Rosedale Cemetery in 1960. A VA Medal of Honor grave marker was placed near the mass grave in Rosedale Cemetery in error. His actual burial site at Mount Moriah Cemetery was discovered in 2015.

== See also ==
- Joseph E. Vantine
- List of Medal of Honor recipients
- List of American Civil War Medal of Honor recipients: M-P
