= Henry Hickman (disambiguation) =

Henry Hickman (died 1692) was an English ejected minister and controversialist.

Henry Hickman may also refer to:

- Henry Hill Hickman (1800–1830), physician
- Henry Hickman Harte (1790–1848), Irish mathematician
- Henry Hickman (MP) (died 1618), member of parliament for Northampton, son of Rose Lok

== See also ==
- David Henry Hickman (1821–1869), Missouri legislator
- Hickman (surname)
