= David Hickman =

David Hickman may refer to:

- David Hickman (musician), trumpet player, past president of International Trumpet Guild
- David Henry Hickman (1821–1869), legislator and businessman from Columbia, Missouri
- David Hickman (producer), English film producer and director
- David Emanuel Hickman (1988–2011), last American soldier killed in the Iraq War

== See also ==
- David Henry Hickman High School, Columbia, Missouri
