= Joseph E. Vantine =

Joseph Ebur Vantine
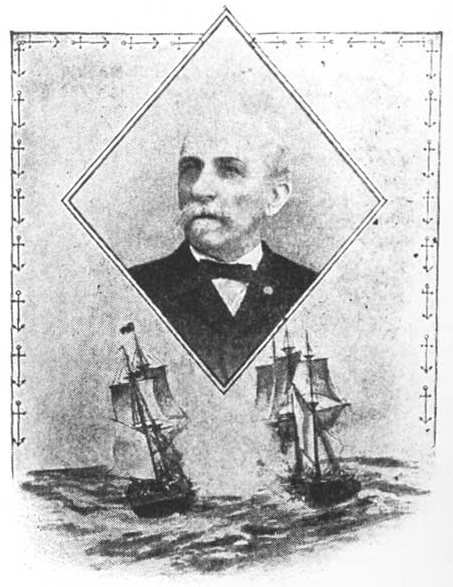
- Fireman Joseph Vantine
- Born: March 20, 1835; Philadelphia, Pennsylvania
- Died: May 5, 1904; New Castle, Delaware
- Burial place: Glebe Cemetery, New Castle, Delaware
- Military career
- Allegiance: United States; Union
- Branch: United States Navy; Union Navy
- Service years: 1857-59, 1861-64
- Rank: First Class Fireman
- Nickname: Chain Armor Joe
- Units: USS Richmond; USS Minnesota; USS Princeton (1851); USS North Carolina (1820)
- Conflicts: American Civil War
- Awards: Medal of Honor

Joseph Ebur Vantine (March 20, 1835 – May 5, 1904) was a United States Navy sailor and a recipient of the United States military's highest decoration—the Medal of Honor—for his actions in the American Civil War.

== Military service ==
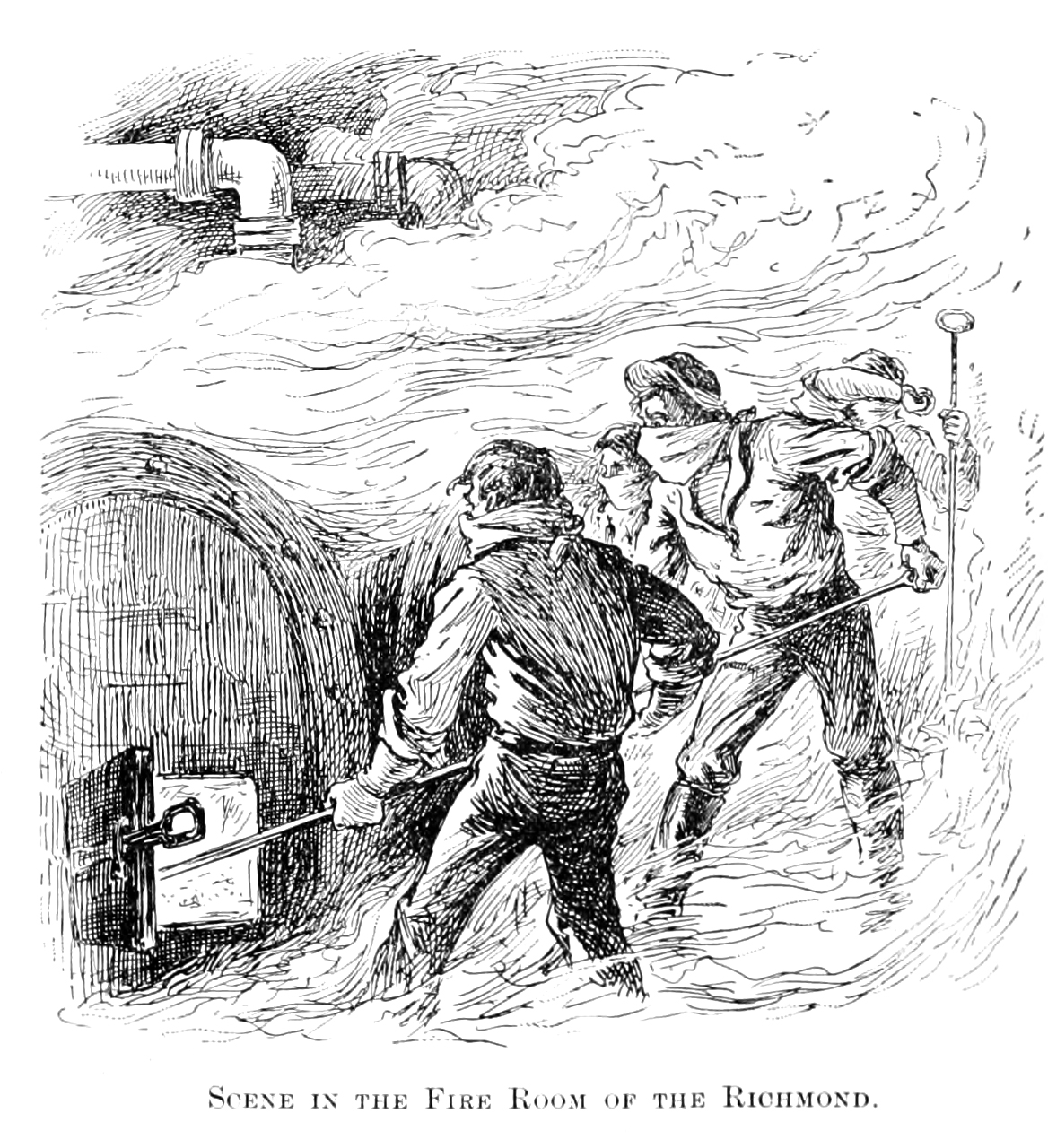
Illustration of Matthew McClelland, Vantine, John Rush and John Hickman on the USS Richmond in the attack on the Port Hudson batteries, March 14, 1863, the action that earned them the Medal of Honor

Joseph Vantine was born on March 20, 1835, in Philadelphia, Pennsylvania. Vantine's first enlistment in the United States Navy was on May 19, 1857 at Philadelphia and he served on the USS Minnesota as a Second Class Fireman. He was honorably discharged on June 10, 1859. Vantine's second enlistment in the United States Navy was on July 13, 1861 at New York, New York and he served on the USS North Carolina (1820) as a First Class Fireman till July 27, 1861. He transferred to the USS Richmond on July 28, 1861 and served as a First Class Fireman till August 29, 1864. He then transferred to the receiving ship USS Princeton (1851) on August 30, 1864 and was honorably discharged September 9, 1864.

During the Civil War, Vantine served as a First Class Fireman aboard the steamship USS Richmond. As a fireman, Vantine's duties were to tend to the ship's steam boilers.

In the prelude to the siege of Port Hudson, Louisiana, Rear Admiral David Farragut attempted to move a flotilla of ships, including the Richmond, up the Mississippi River past the town of Port Hudson. On March 14, 1863, the flotilla reached the town and came under heavy fire from Confederate artillery batteries. The enemy guns inflicted severe damage on the Union flotilla, forcing most of the ships to turn back.

During the battle, the Richmond's fireroom, which housed its boilers, was damaged by an enemy shell and began to fill with hot steam. Vantine entered the room and "hauled the fires", or put out the furnaces, to prevent further danger. For his actions he was awarded the Medal of Honor four months later, on July 10, 1863.

== Medal of Honor citation ==

Rank and organization: First Class Fireman, U.S. Navy. Accredited to: Pennsylvania. G.O. No.: 17, July 10, 1863.

Vantine's official Medal of Honor Citation reads:

Serving on board the U.S.S. Richmond in the attack on Port Hudson, March 14, 1863. Damaged by a 6 inch solid rifle shot which shattered the starboard safety valve chamber and also damaged the port safety valve, the fireroom of the Richmond immediately filled with steam to place it in an extremely critical condition. Acting courageously in this crisis, Vantine persisted in penetrating the steam filled room in order to haul the hot fires of the furnaces and continued this action until the gravity of the situation had been lessened.

== Death and burial ==
Medal of Honor recipient Joseph E. Vantine died of general debility as a result of a paralytic stroke at age 69 and was buried at Glebe Cemetery in New Castle, Delaware.

Vantine's death notice in the May 9, 1904 Philadelphia Inquirer newspaper read:

"Chain Armor Joe" at Rest, Special to the Inquirer. NEW CASTLE, Del., May 8. - Joseph E. Vantine, formerly of Philadelphia, where he was born March 20, 1835, and was afterwards educated, was laid to rest in the new P. E. Cemetery this afternoon with Masonic ceremony. Many persons from Philadelphia and Wilmington were present at the funeral.

== See also ==
- Matthew McClelland
- List of Medal of Honor recipients
- List of American Civil War Medal of Honor recipients: T–Z
