= John Hickman =

John Hickman may refer to:

- John Hickman (musician) (1942–2021), American banjo player with Byron Berline
- John Hickman (Pennsylvania politician) (1810–1875), U.S. representative from Pennsylvania, 1855–1863
- John W. Hickman (Pennsylvania politician) (1831–1906), American politician from Pennsylvania
- John Hickman (Medal of Honor) (1837–1904), American Civil War sailor and Medal of Honor recipient
- John W. Hickman (Utah politician) (born 1939), American politician from Utah
- John Hickman (meteorologist) (1927–2014), New Zealand meteorologist
- Johnny Hickman (born 1959), musician with Cracker
- John M. Hickman (1925–1964), architect in Wichita and Frank Lloyd Wright disciple
- J. E. Hickman (John Edward Hickman], 1883–1962), justice of the Supreme Court of Texas
- John Hickman (diplomat), British ambassador; see List of ambassadors of the United Kingdom to Chile

== See also ==
- Jonathan Hickman, American comic book writer and illustrator
