= USS Hickman County =

United States Tank Carrier Ship

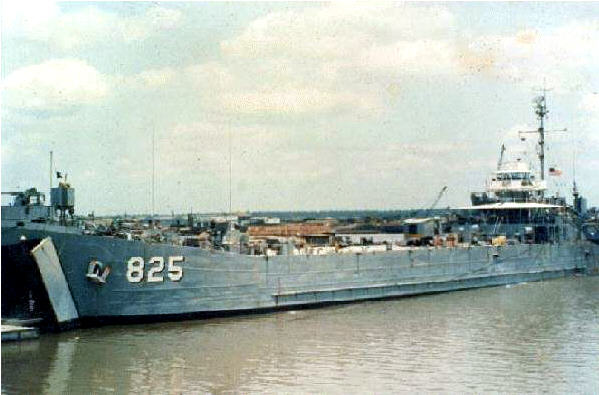
- USS Hickman County (LST-825) beached at the ramp at Đồng Tâm Base Camp, South Vietnam, c. 1969

History

United States
- Name: USS LST-825
- Builder: Missouri Valley Bridge & Iron Company, Evansville, Indiana
- Laid down: 2 October 1944
- Launched: 11 November 1944
- Commissioned: 8 December 1944
- Decommissioned: 22 May 1946
- Recommissioned: 3 November 1950
- Decommissioned: 20 September 1955
- Renamed: USS Hickman County (LST-825), 1 July 1955
- Namesake: Hickman County, Kentucky; Hickman County, Tennessee
- Recommissioned: 22 March 1963
- Decommissioned: November 1969
- Stricken: 15 September 1979
- Honors and awards: 1 battle star (World War II); 2 battle stars & Presidential Unit Citation (Korea); 10 campaign stars & Presidential Unit Citation (Vietnam)
- Fate: Transferred to the Philippines, 26 November 1969

Philippines
- Name: RPS Cagayan (LT-97)
- Acquired: 26 November 1969
- Fate: Unknown

General characteristics
- Class & type: LST-542-class tank landing ship
- Displacement: 1,625 long tons (1,651 t) light; 4,080 long tons (4,145 t) full
- Length: 328 ft (100 m)
- Beam: 50 ft (15 m)
- Draft: Unloaded : 2 ft 4 in (0.71 m) forward; 7 ft 6 in (2.29 m) aft; Loaded : 8 ft 2 in (2.49 m) forward; 14 ft 1 in (4.29 m) aft
- Propulsion: 2 × General Motors 12-567 diesel engines, two shafts, twin rudders
- Speed: 12 knots (22 km/h; 14 mph)
- Boats & landing craft carried: Two LCVPs
- Troops: 16 officers, 147 enlisted men
- Complement: 7 officers, 104 enlisted men
- Armament: 8 × 40 mm guns; 12 × 20 mm guns

USS Hickman County (LST-825) was an LST-542-class tank landing ship built for the United States Navy during World War II. Named after counties in Kentucky and Tennessee, she was the only U.S. Naval vessel to bear the name.

Originally laid down as LST-825 on 2 October 1944 by the Missouri Valley Bridge and Iron Company, Evansville, Indiana; launched 11 November; sponsored by Mrs. John Spindler; commissioned at New Orleans on 8 December.

== Service history ==
=== World War II, 1944–1946 ===
After shakedown in the Gulf of Mexico, USS LST-825 loaded oil and cargo at New Orleans and sailed for the West Coast. She arrived at San Diego on 30 January 1945, discharged her cargo and continued on to Seattle, arriving on 4 February. Loading oil, ammunition and embarking troops, LST-825 sailed for the Pacific on 26 February 1945. The momentous Pacific campaign was in full swing at Okinawa when LST-825 reached that rocky Japanese fortress via Pearl Harbor, Guam, Eniwetok, and Ulithi on 21 April to discharge troop reinforcements and cargo. LST-825 retired to Saipan, where she loaded cargo and supplies for the famed Seabees and returned to Okinawa on 26 June. A late July convoy took the LST to Iwo Jima with cargo and supplies; and she returned to Okinawa on 4 September.

Hostilities having ended on 15 August, LST-825 embarked troops and equipment of the Fifth Air Force destined to participate in the occupation of Japan. Entering Tokyo Bay on 25 September, she disembarked the occupation forces and their equipment and set course for Okinawa. During November 1945 LST-825 completed a second Okinawa-Japan trip. On the 16th the landing ship embarked 514 enlisted men at Guam and sailed for the United States via Pearl Harbor as part of the Operation Magic Carpet fleet bringing home veterans, arriving San Francisco on 22 December. After a few months of tactical operations along the West Coast, LST-825 decommissioned at Swan Island in Portland, Oregon, and joined the Pacific Reserve Fleet on 22 May 1946.

=== Korean War, 1950–1954 ===
With the outbreak of hostilities in Korea, LST-825 recommissioned on 3 November 1950. After training out of San Diego, LST-825 entered Pearl Harbor on 8 April 1951 where she transported passengers and cargo among the Hawaiian Islands until returning stateside on 1 July. On 17 September she returned to Hawaii and operated there until her return on 16 December to San Diego. Departing San Diego on 26 April 1952, the LST arrived at Yokosuka on 11 June via Pearl Harbor and Midway Island. She made several cruises to the Korean coast to participate in tactical amphibious exercises and maneuvers of U.S. and Republic of Korean troops. LST-825 also carried prisoners-of-war from Korea to Japan. She returned to San Diego on 5 March 1953 for scheduled amphibious landing exercises and fleet tactics along the western seaboard. Her second Western Pacific cruise began on her departure from California on 20 January 1954. Spring and early summer were spent in operations along the Japanese and Korean coast as well as cargo duty between Eniwetok and Bikini Atoll.NOTE above statements not exact! The 825 left San Diego on the way to the far east in the fall of 1951, laying over I Hawaii and leaving Pearl Harbor Dec, 7, 1951 on its way to Japan via Midway Isle. Prisoners were transported to a prison camp in the southern part of Korea, not Japan. At least, that's a fact for the year 1952.

=== Operation Passage to Freedom, 1954–1955 ===
On 11 August 1954 LST-825 departed Yokosuka for French Indochina, where she assisted in "Operation Passage to Freedom." When the French withdrew from Indochina, after their defeat in the First Indochina War, and the subsequent partition of Vietnam, over 800,000 North Vietnamese chose to forsake their homes and move to the southern half of the country. Nearly 100 ships of the U.S. Navy under Rear Admiral Lorenzo S. Sabin helped transport the refugees in a mass exodus. In all, the U.S. Navy evacuated 310,848 North Vietnamese as well as 68,757 tons of cargo and over 8,000 vehicles. Hard-pressed and cramped sailors were rewarded when many of the 184 children born on the "Passage to Freedom" were named after U.S. ships and officers. Part of this task force from 26 August to 5 October 1954, LST-825 made five trips from the Northern capital, Haiphong, to southern ports with Vietnamese refugees and French troops and equipment. In recognition of her efforts the ship was awarded the Vietnamese Presidential Unit Citation. LST-825 returned to San Diego on 27 November 1954 and operated out of there until decommissioned on 20 September 1955, having been renamed USS Hickman County (LST-825) on 1 July.

=== Dominican Republic, 1963–1965 ===
Hickman County recommissioned in service at San Diego on 22 March 1963. Assigned to LST Reserve Squadron 2, she reported to the U.S. Naval Amphibious Base at Little Creek, Virginia on 19 June 1963. For the next two years she underwent various phases of training in amphibious warfare. In May 1965 the Dominican Republic crisis erupted and Hickman County sailed from Norfolk, Virginia on 8 May laden with supplies for the logistical support of the U.S. Armed Forces keeping the peace in that country. Hickman County remained in the Caribbean area as a standby ship supplying the United States contingent in the Dominican Republic until 15 July when it called at Puerto de Haina, Dominican Republic to embark Army troops and sailed for Sunny Point, North Carolina, debarking them on 22 July 1965. From 26 August until 9 December, the busy ship transferred military personnel and cargo between the United States and the Dominican Republic and acted as host to foreign ships at San Juan, Puerto Rico. On 10 December she arrived at Little Creek, departing for Brooklyn, New York four days later for overhaul.

=== Vietnam, 1966–1969 ===
On 23 February 1966 the ship transited the Panama Canal, arriving at Pearl Harbor on 19 March and departed Kāne'ohe Bay, Oahu on 4 April 1966 for the Western Pacific.

During the Vietnam War Hickman County participated in the following campaigns:

- Vietnamese Counteroffensive (6 May–30 June 1966)
- Vietnamese Counteroffensive – Phase II (1 July 1966 – 31 May 1967)
- Vietnamese Counteroffensive – Phase III (1 June–31 December 1967)
- Tet Counteroffensive (16 February–1 April 1968)
- Vietnamese Counteroffensive – Phase IV (2 April–30 June 1968)
- Vietnamese Counteroffensive – Phase V (1 July–1 November 1968)
- Vietnamese Counteroffensive – Phase VI (29 December 1968 – 22 February 1969)
- Tet 69/Counteroffensive (23 February–8 June 1969)
- Vietnam Summer-Fall 1969 (9 June–26 July 1969)
- Vietnam Winter-Spring 1969 (1–3 November 1969)

=== Decommissioning and transfer, 1969–1979 ===
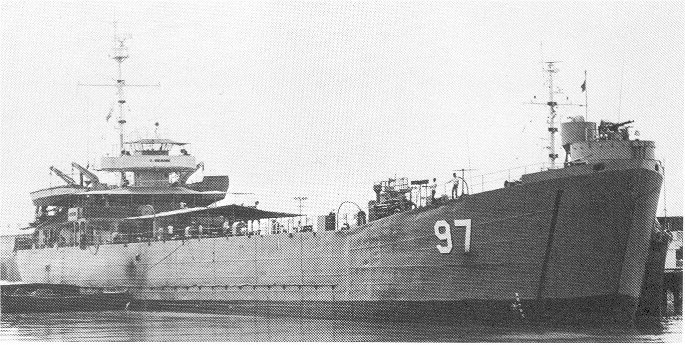
The ex-USS Hickman County (LST-825) in the Republic of the Philippines service as RPS Cagayan (LT-97) moored pier side

Decommissioned (date unknown), she was transferred to the Philippines on 26 November 1969, and the ship was renamed as RPS Cagayan (LT-97). Struck from the Naval Vessel Register on 15 September 1979, her final fate is unknown.

== Awards ==
As LST-825 the ship earned one battle star for World War II service, and two battle stars and the Korean Presidential Unit Citation for Korean War service. As Hickman County she earned ten campaign stars, and the Vietnamese Presidential Unit Citation for Vietnam War service.
