= Terezín =

- Town
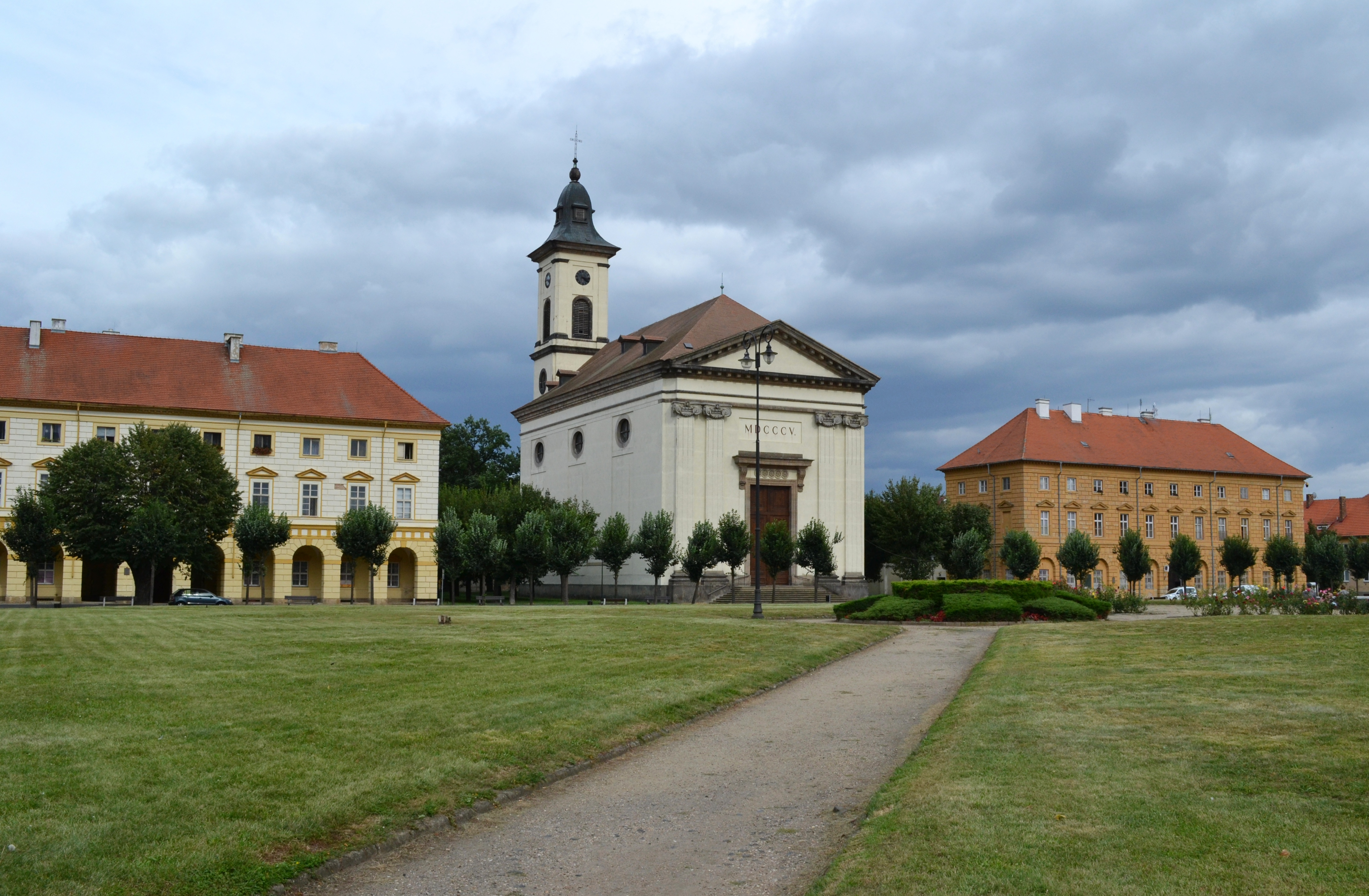
- Town square with the Church of the Resurrection of Christ

- Flag Coat of arms

- Location in the Czech Republic
- Coordinates: 50°30′40″N 14°9′2″E
- Country: Czech Republic
- Region: Ústí nad Labem
- District: Litoměřice
- Founded: 1780

Government
  - Mayor: René Tomášek

Area
  - Total: 13.52 km^{2} (5.22 sq mi)
- Elevation: 150 m (490 ft)

Population (2026-01-01)
  - Total: 2,852
  - Density: 210.9/km^{2} (546.3/sq mi)
- Time zone: UTC+1 (CET)
  - Summer (DST): UTC+2 (CEST)
- Postal code: 411 55
- Website: www.terezin.cz

Terezín (Czech pronunciation: [ˈtɛrɛziːn]; German: Theresienstadt) is a town in Litoměřice District in the Ústí nad Labem Region of the Czech Republic. It has about 2,900 inhabitants. The town is located on the Ohře River, in the Lower Ohře Table.

Founded in 1780, Terezín is a former military fortress composed of the citadel and adjacent walled garrison town. The town centre is well preserved and is protected as an urban monument reservation. Terezín is infamously known as the location of the Nazis' Theresienstadt Ghetto.

== Administrative division ==
Terezín consists of four municipal parts (in brackets population according to the 2021 census):

- Terezín (1,875)
- České Kopisty (551)
- Nové Kopisty (397)
- Počaply (139)

== Etymology ==
The fortress town was named after Empress Maria Theresa (Czech: Marie Terezie).

== Geography ==
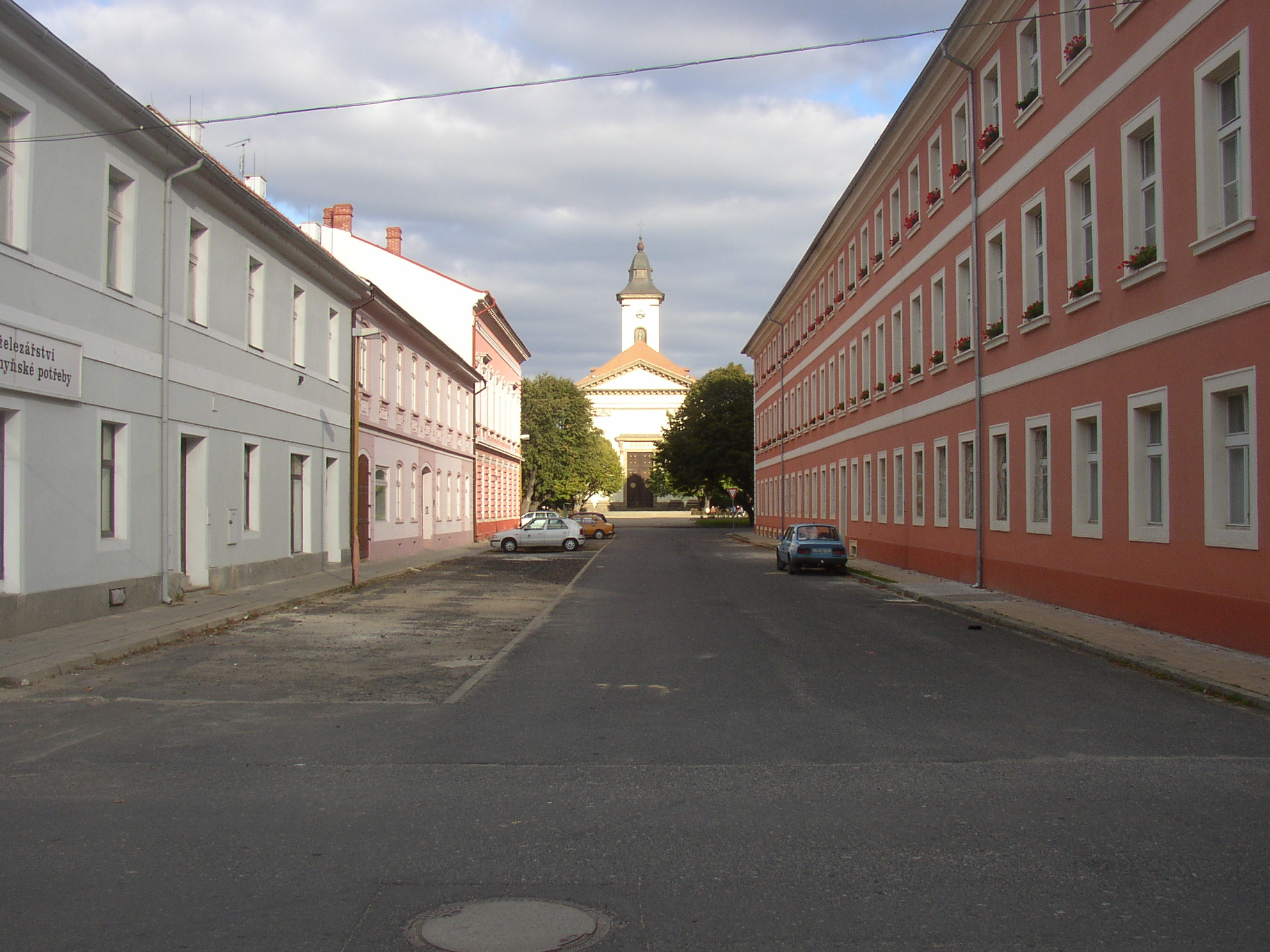
Havlíčkova Street

Terezín is located about 3 kilometres (2 mi) south of Litoměřice and 18 km (11 mi) southeast of Ústí nad Labem. It lies in a flat landscape of the Lower Ohře Table. It is situated on both banks of the Ohře River, near its confluence with the Elbe. The Elbe forms the northern municipal border.

== History ==
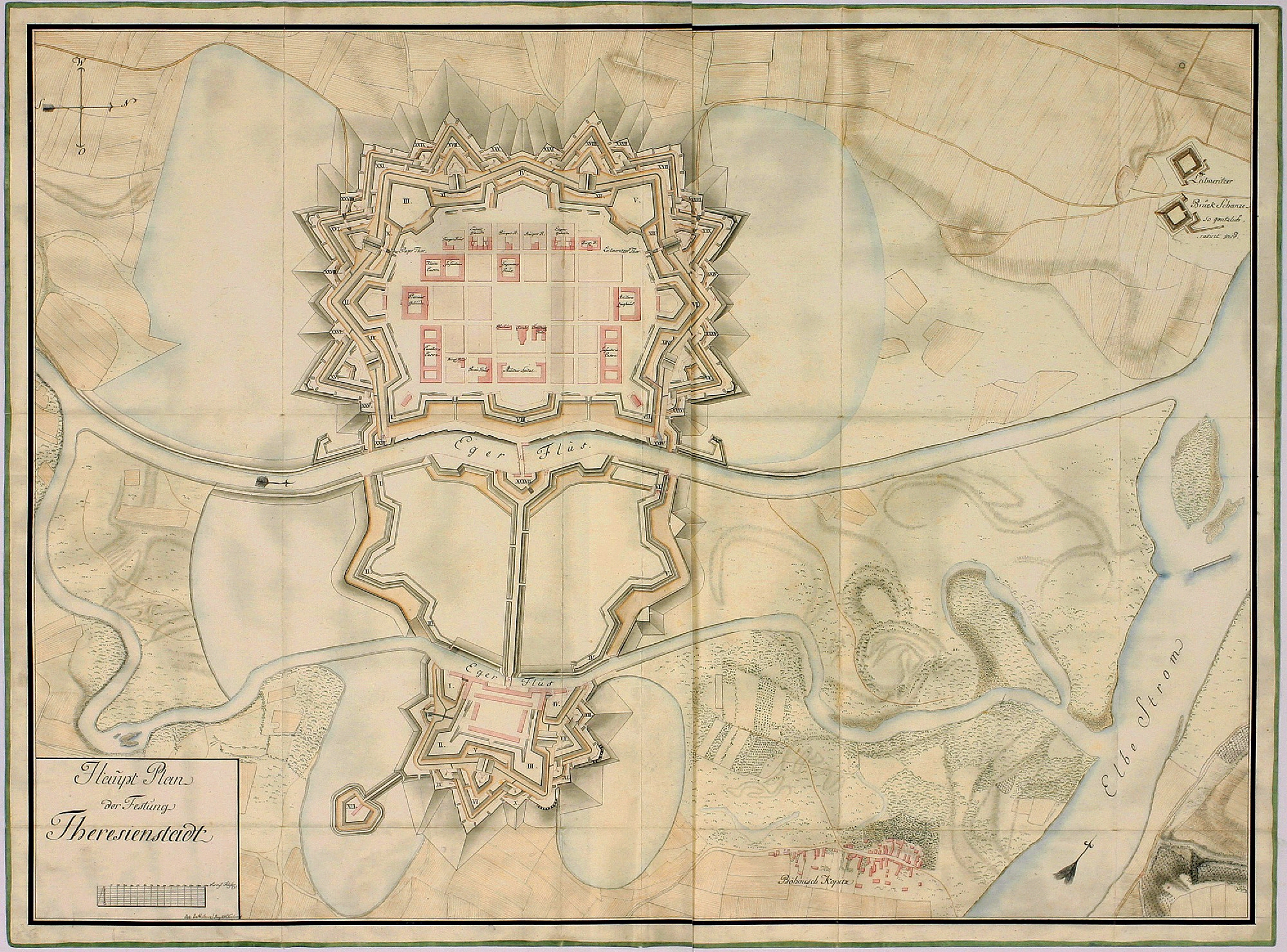
Terezín map (1790); north on the right

On 10 January 1780, Habsburg Emperor Joseph II ordered the erection of the fortress, named Theresienstadt after his mother Empress Maria Theresa. In the times of Austria–Prussia rivalry, it was meant to secure the bridges across the Ohře and Elbe rivers against Prussian troops invading the Bohemian lands from neighbouring Saxony. Simultaneously, Josefov Fortress (Josephstadt) was erected near Jaroměř as a protection against Prussian attacks.

The construction of Theresienstadt started at the westernmost cavalier on 10 October 1780 and lasted ten years. During the construction, in 1782, Theresienstadt became a free royal town. The fortress consisted of a citadel, the "Small Fortress", to the east of the Ohře, and a walled town, the "Main Fortress", to the west. The total area of the fortress was 3.89 km^{2} (1.50 mi^{2}). In peacetime it held 5,655 soldiers, and in wartime around 11,000 soldiers could be placed here. Trenches and low-lying areas around the fortress could be flooded for defensive purposes. Garrison church in the Main Fortress was designed by Heinrich Hatzinger, Julius D'Andreis and Franz Joseph Fohmann.

The fortress was never under direct siege. During the Austro-Prussian War, on 28 July 1866, part of the garrison attacked and destroyed an important railway bridge near Neratovice (rail line Turnov–Kralupy nad Vltavou) that was shortly before repaired by the Prussians. This attack occurred two days after Austria and Prussia had agreed to make peace, but the Theresienstadt garrison was ignorant of the news.

During the second half of the 19th century, the fortress was also used as a prison. During World War I, the fortress was used as a political prison camp. Soldiers and civilians who showed opposition to the war were imprisoned here.

With the collapse of Austria-Hungary in 1918, the town became part of the newly-formed state of Czechoslovakia. During the occupation of Czechoslovakia in 1939–1945, the town was part of the Protectorate of Bohemia and Moravia.

=== World War II ===
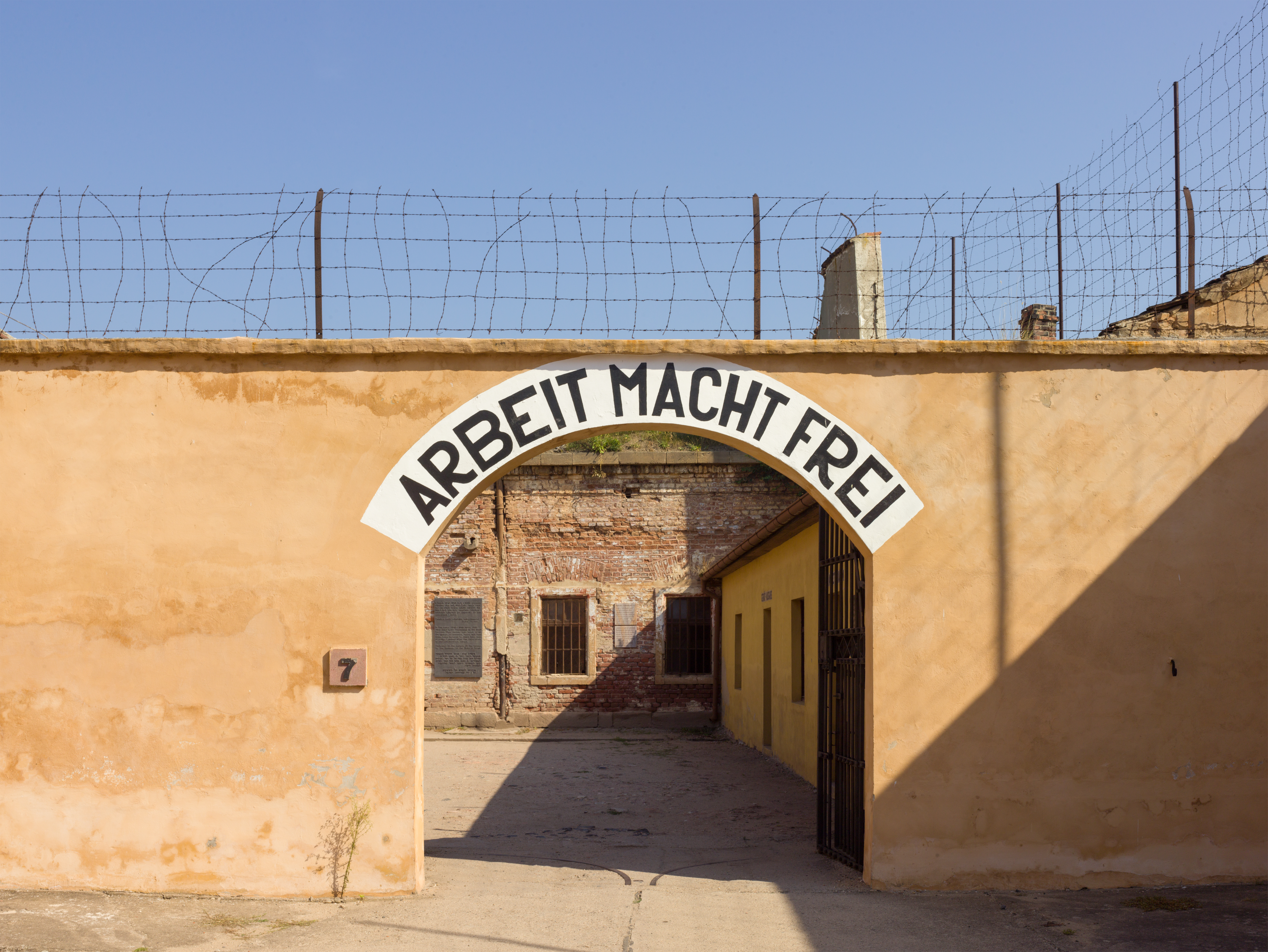
Gate with the slogan Arbeit macht frei in the Small Fortress

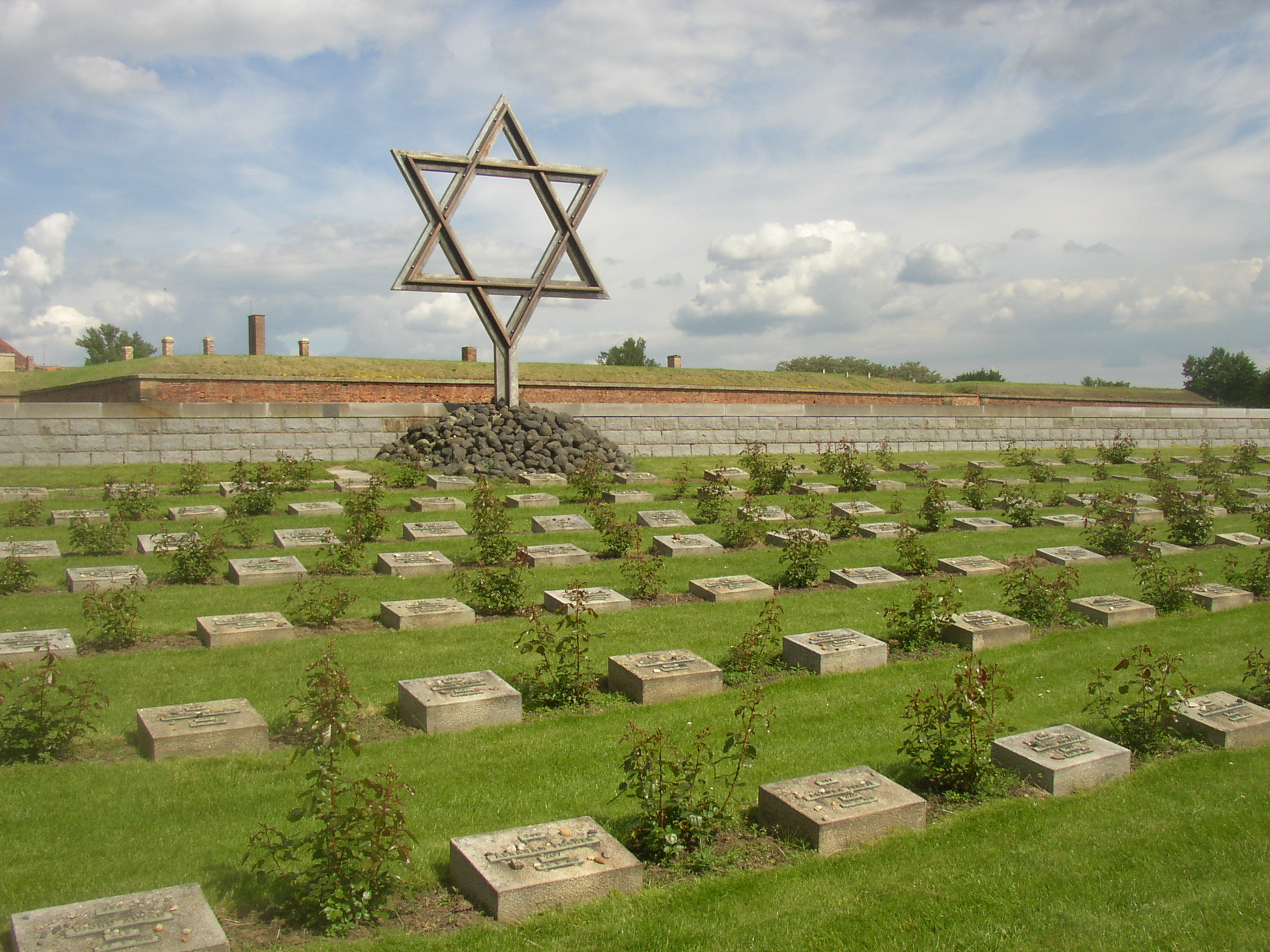
National Cemetery – Jewish section

After the Munich Agreement in September 1938 and following the occupation of the rest of Czechoslovakia in March 1939, with the existing prisons gradually filled up as a result of the Nazi terror, the Prague Gestapo Police prison was set up in the Small Fortress in 1940. The first inmates arrived on 14 June 1940. By the end of the war 32,000 prisoners of whom 5,000 were women passed through the Small Fortress. These were primarily Czechs, later other nationals, for instance citizens of the former Soviet Union, Poles, Germans, and Yugoslavs. Most of the prisoners were arrested for various acts of resistance to the Nazi regime; among them were the family members and supporters of the assassins of Reinhard Heydrich. Many prisoners were later sent to concentration camps such as Mauthausen. The Jewish Ghetto was created in 1941.

By 1940, Germany assigned the Gestapo to adapt Terezín, better known by the German name Theresienstadt, as a ghetto and concentration camp. Considerable work was done in the next two years to adapt the complex for the dense overcrowding that inmates would be subjected to. It held primarily Jews from Czechoslovakia, as well as tens of thousands of Jews deported chiefly from Germany and Austria, as well as hundreds from the Netherlands and Denmark. More than 150,000 Jews were sent there, including 15,000 children.

Although it was not an extermination camp, about 33,000 died in the ghetto. This was mostly due to the appalling conditions arising out of extreme population density, malnutrition and disease. About 88,000 inhabitants were deported to Auschwitz and the other extermination camps. As late as the end of 1944, the Germans were still deporting Jews to the death camps. At the end of the war, there were 17,247 survivors of Theresienstadt (including some who had survived the death camps).

Part of the fortification (Small Fortress) served as the largest Gestapo prison in the Protectorate of Bohemia and Moravia. It was on the other side of the river from the ghetto and operated separately. Around 90,000 people went through it, and 2,600 died there.

The complex was taken over for operation by the International Red Cross on 2 May 1945, with the Commander and SS guards fleeing within the next two days. Some were later captured. The camp and prison were liberated on 9 May 1945 by the Soviet Army.

=== After World War II ===
After the German surrender, the small fortress was used as an internment camp for ethnic Germans. In May 1945 the camp shifted under the control of the Czech Ministry for Domestic Affairs. From then on the inmates were gradually transferred to Germany and Terezín was increasingly used as a hub for the forced migration of Germans from the Czech lands into Germany proper. War criminals were temporarily imprisoned in Terezín, but they made up only a small part of the interned. On 1 January 1948 the camp was officially closed, but the last German prisoners were released in February. At least 548 people died in the camp during the years 1945–1948 due to poor living conditions, malnutrition and infectious diseases, but also as a result of the violence of the guards.

=== Modern history ===
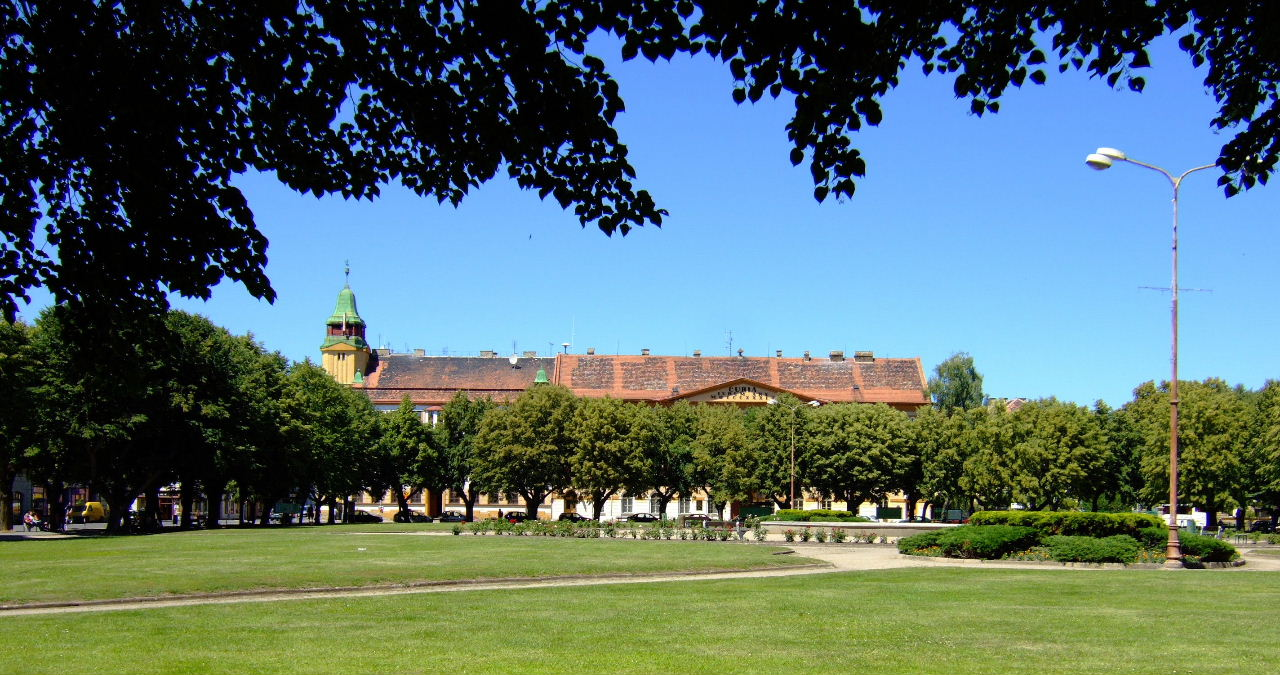
Town hall on the town square

After the related war uses, the government retained a military garrison until 1996.

The town was struck by the 2002 European floods during which the crematorium was damaged. According to the Fund, a long-term conservation plan was conceived, which includes further repairs, documentation, and archaeological research.

== Demographics ==
Historical population

Year	Pop.	±%
1869	3,159	—
1880	7,845	+148.3%
1890	8,140	+3.8%
1900	8,152	+0.1%
1910	7,509	−7.9%

Year	Pop.	±%
1921	8,293	+10.4%
1930	8,843	+6.6%
1950	4,491	−49.2%
1961	3,938	−12.3%
1970	3,944	+0.2%

Year	Pop.	±%
1980	3,450	−12.5%
1991	2,892	−16.2%
2001	2,930	+1.3%
2011	2,950	+0.7%
2021	2,962	+0.4%

Source: Censuses

== Economy ==
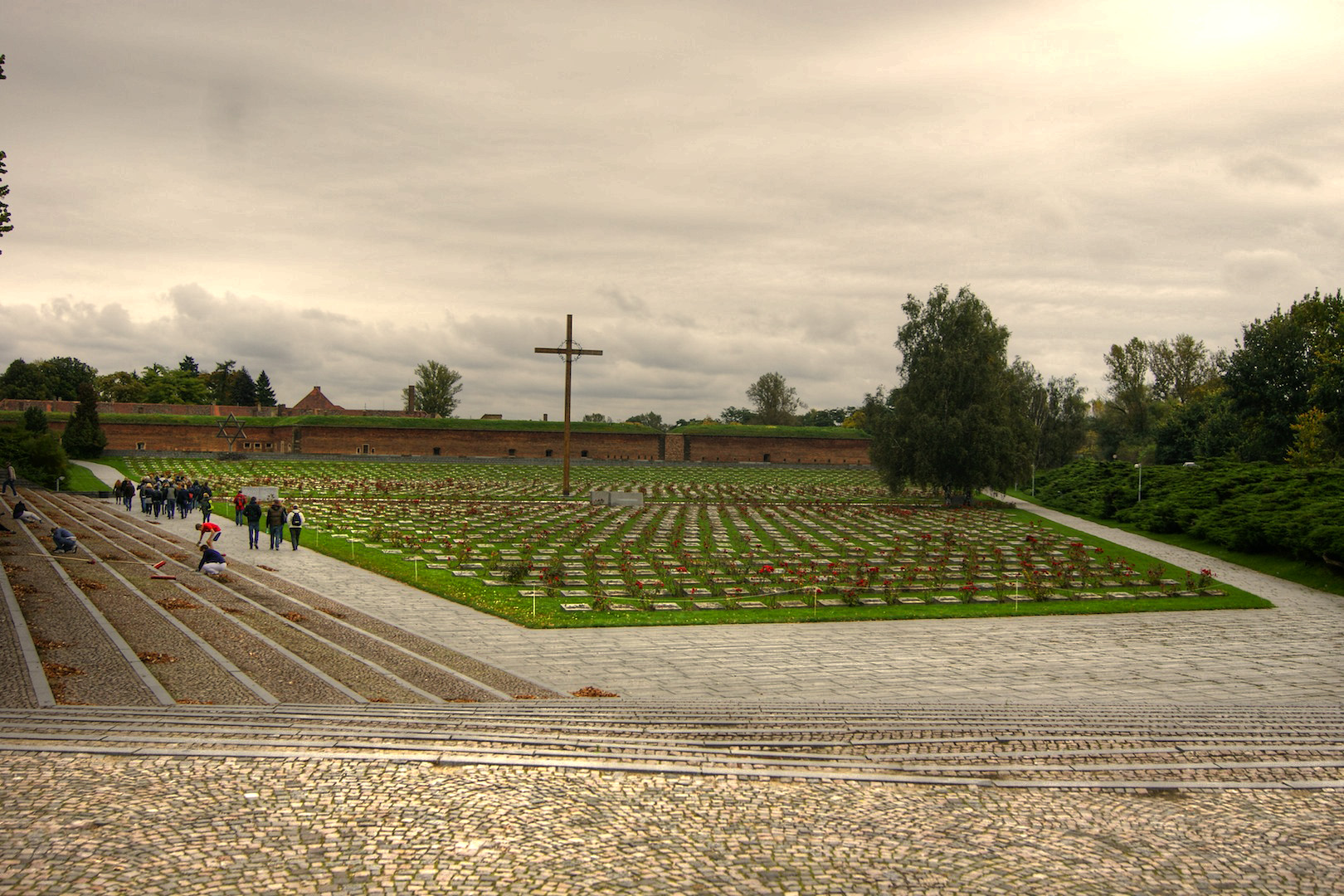
National Cemetery

Terezín is mainly dependent on tourism. With almost 260 thousand visitors, Terezín Memorial was the second most visited tourist destination of the Ústí nad Labem Region and the most visited memorial place in the country in 2024.

== Transport ==
The I/15 road from Most to Litoměřice runs next to the town. Terezín is served by the train stations in neighbouring Bohušovice nad Ohří and Litoměřice.

== Sights ==
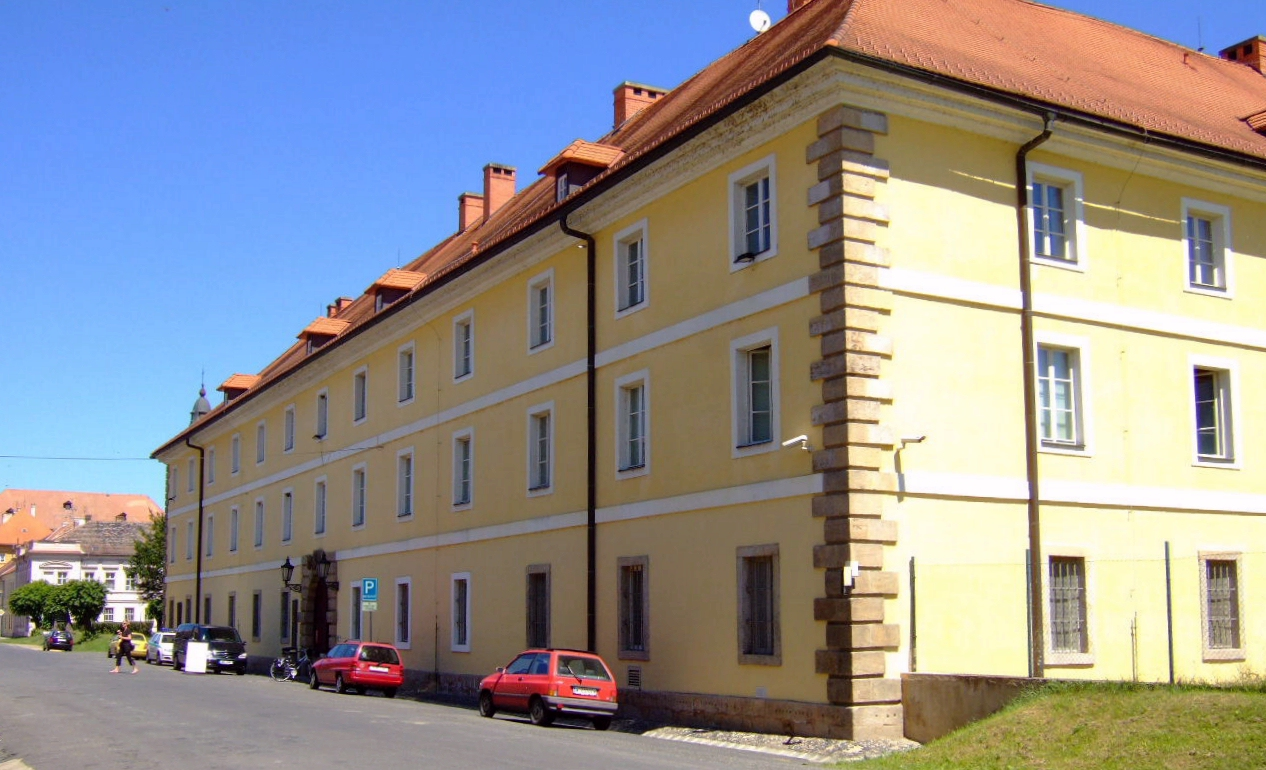
Former Magdeburg Barracks

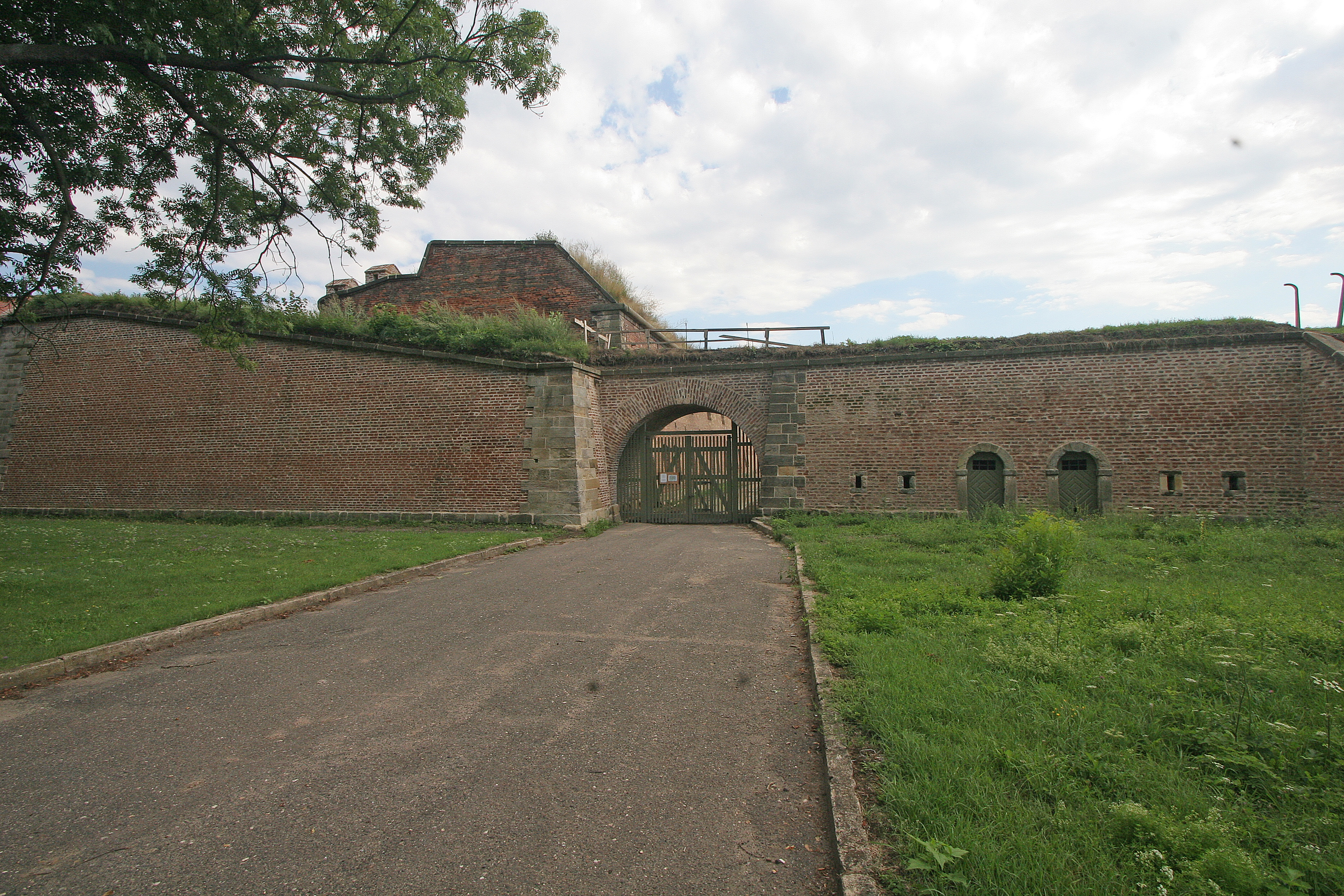
Town fortifications

=== Terezín Fortress ===
Terezín Fortress is one of the most visited memorial sites in Central Europe. In 2002, the fortress, which was in a deteriorated condition, was listed in the 2002 World Monuments Watch by the World Monuments Fund. The organisation called for a comprehensive conservation plan, while providing funding for emergency repairs from American Express. A conservation plan was eventually developed in cooperation with national authorities.

The town provides many museums, most of them reflect its history. Terezín Memorial include:

- Small Fortress;
- Ghetto Museum;
- National Cemetery;
- Memorial on the bank of the Ohře River;
- Park of the Terezín Children;
- Former Magdeburg Barracks;
- Jewish Prayer Room;
- Railway siding;
- Columbarium;
- Ceremonial Halls and the Central Morgue of the Ghetto;
- Jewish Cemetery and the Crematorium;
- Cemetery of Soviet soldiers.

Other museums inside the fortress, all located in the Cavalier 2 complex, include Cavalier 2 Museum with an exhibition of lives of soldiers in the 18th century; La Grace Museum; Museum of Nostalgia with an exhibition of items from the socialist era of the country; and Geocaching Museum.

=== Other sights ===
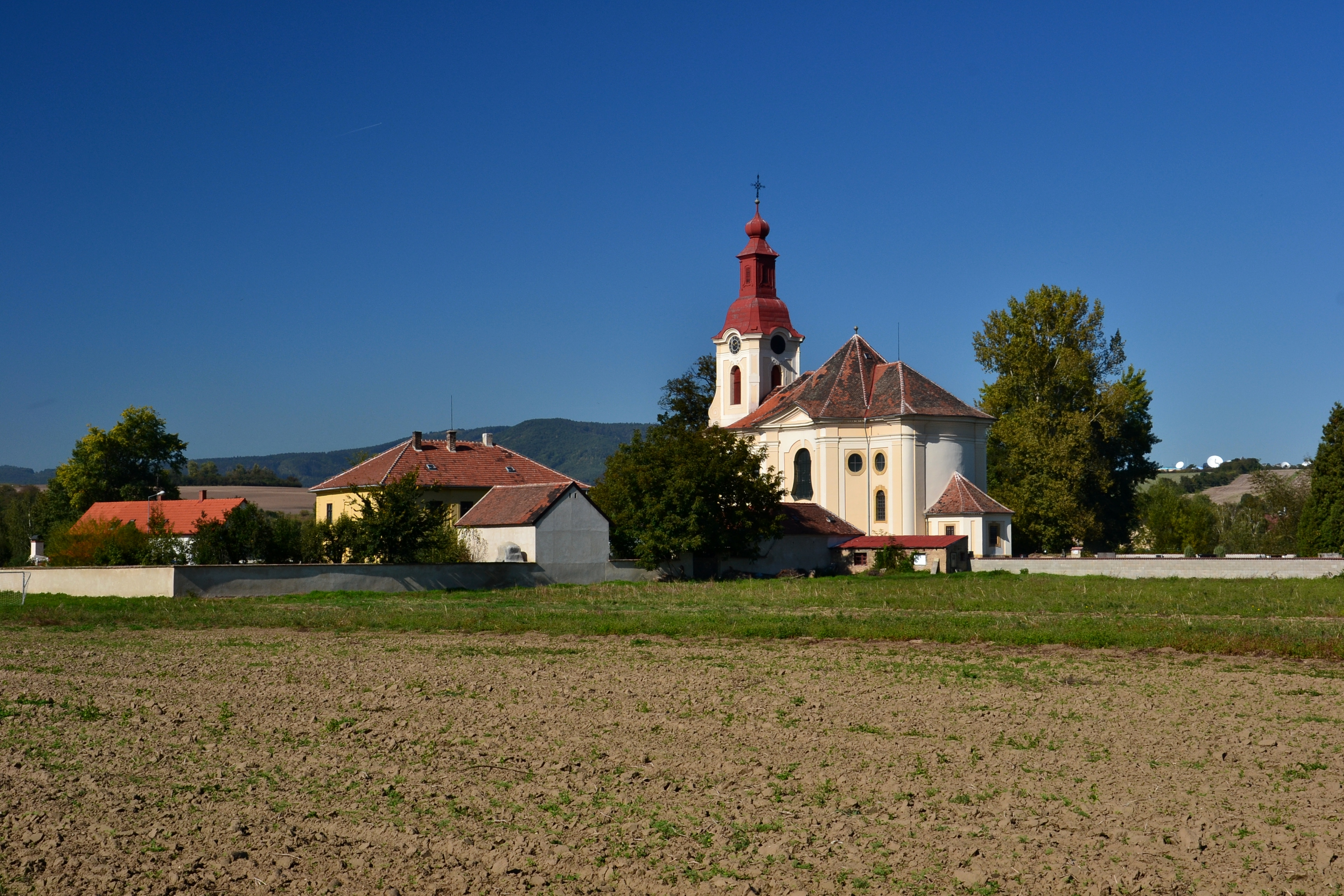
Church of Saint Adalbert in Počaply

The Church of the Resurrection of Christ was built in the Empire style in 1805–1810. With its tall tower, it belongs among the main landmarks of the town. It is a very valuable example of a sacral building in the Czech Republic in this style.

The Church of Saint Adalbert is located in the village of Počaply. It was built in the Baroque style in 1724–1726 by Kilian Ignaz Dientzenhofer.

== Notable people ==
- Agnese Schebest (1813–1870), Austrian opera singer
- Anton Leo Hickmann (1834–1906), Austrian geographer and statistician
- Olga Fialka (1848–1930), Austrian-Czech artist
- Pauline Metzler-Löwy (1853–1921), Austrian opera singer
- Zdenko Hudeček (1887–1974), Czech-Austrian military officer
- Gavrilo Princip (1894–1918), the assassin of Franz Ferdinand; died here in imprisonment
- Maria Müller (1898–1958), Czech-Austrian operatic singer
- Helmut Zborowski (1905–1969), Austrian aircraft designer

== Twin towns – sister cities ==
Terezín is twinned with:

- Dębno, Poland
- Komárno, Slovakia
- Strausberg, Germany
