= Pauline Metzler-Löwy =

Austrian opera singer

- Born: 31 August 1853; Theresienstadt, Bohemia, Austrian Empire
- Died: 28 June 1921 (aged 67); Osterfeld-Roda, Saxony-Anhalt, Germany
- Education: Prague Conservatory
- Occupation: Contralto singer

Pauline Metzler-Löwy (31 August 1853 – 28 June 1921) was an Austrian contralto singer. Trained at the Prague Conservatory, she performed in Altenburg, Bremen, Brunswick, Hamburg, Leipzig, and other cities.

== Early years and education ==
Pauline Lowy was born at Theresienstadt, Bohemia, 31 August 1853. At the age of seven, she entered the Prague Conservatory, where she studied for four years.

== Career ==
Graduating with honors, she immediately received an engagement at the theatre in Altenburg. Her principal roles at this time were in Gluck's Orfeo ed Euridice, Azucena in Il trovatore, and Nancy in Martha. In 1875, she went to Leipzig at the invitation of Friedrich Hasse, then manager of the Stadttheater there, and after her debut, was at once permanently engaged. Here she remained for 12 years, singing with extraordinary success under three successive managers, Hasse, Angelo Neumann, and Max Staegemann. She frequently appeared also at concerts and in oratorio at Hamburg, Bremen, Leipzig, Brunswick, and other cities, her appearance at the musical festival of the Allgemeiner Deutscher Musikverein in 1886 being especially memorable in this connection. In 1881, Lowy married the piano-teacher Ferdinand Metzler. After her retirement from the operatic stage on 12 June 1887, she devoted herself principally to concert performances and later, from 1897, exclusively to vocal instruction. Metzler-Löwy died 28 June 1921 in Roda (part of Osterfeld), Saxony-Anhalt.
