= Jay Hickman =

Jay Hickman may refer to:

- Jay Hickman (actor) (born 1973), American voiceover actor
- Jay Hickman (comedian) (1955–1993), American comedian
