= Hickman House =

Hickman House may refer to:

(by state)

- Hickman House (Camden, Arkansas), listed on the NRHP in Ouachita County, Arkansas
- Hickman Row, Claymont, DE, listed on the NRHP in New Castle County, Delaware
- William Hickman House, Winchester, Kentucky, NRHP-listed
- Thomas Hickman House, New Franklin, Missouri, NRHP-listed
