= Helmut Zborowski =

Austrian aircraft designer

- Born: Helmut Graf von Zborowski; 21 August 1905. Theresienstadt, Kingdom of Bohemia, Austria-Hungary (now Czech Republic)
- Died: 16 November 1969 (aged 64); Brunoy, France

Helmut Graf von Zborowski (21 August 1905 in Theresienstadt, Bohemia – 16 November 1969 in Brunoy, France) was an Austrian designer for VTOL. In rocket technology, he was involved in the development of the Fieseler Fi 103 and the A4 with Wernher von Braun.
