= John Rush (Medal of Honor) =

Israel W. Little
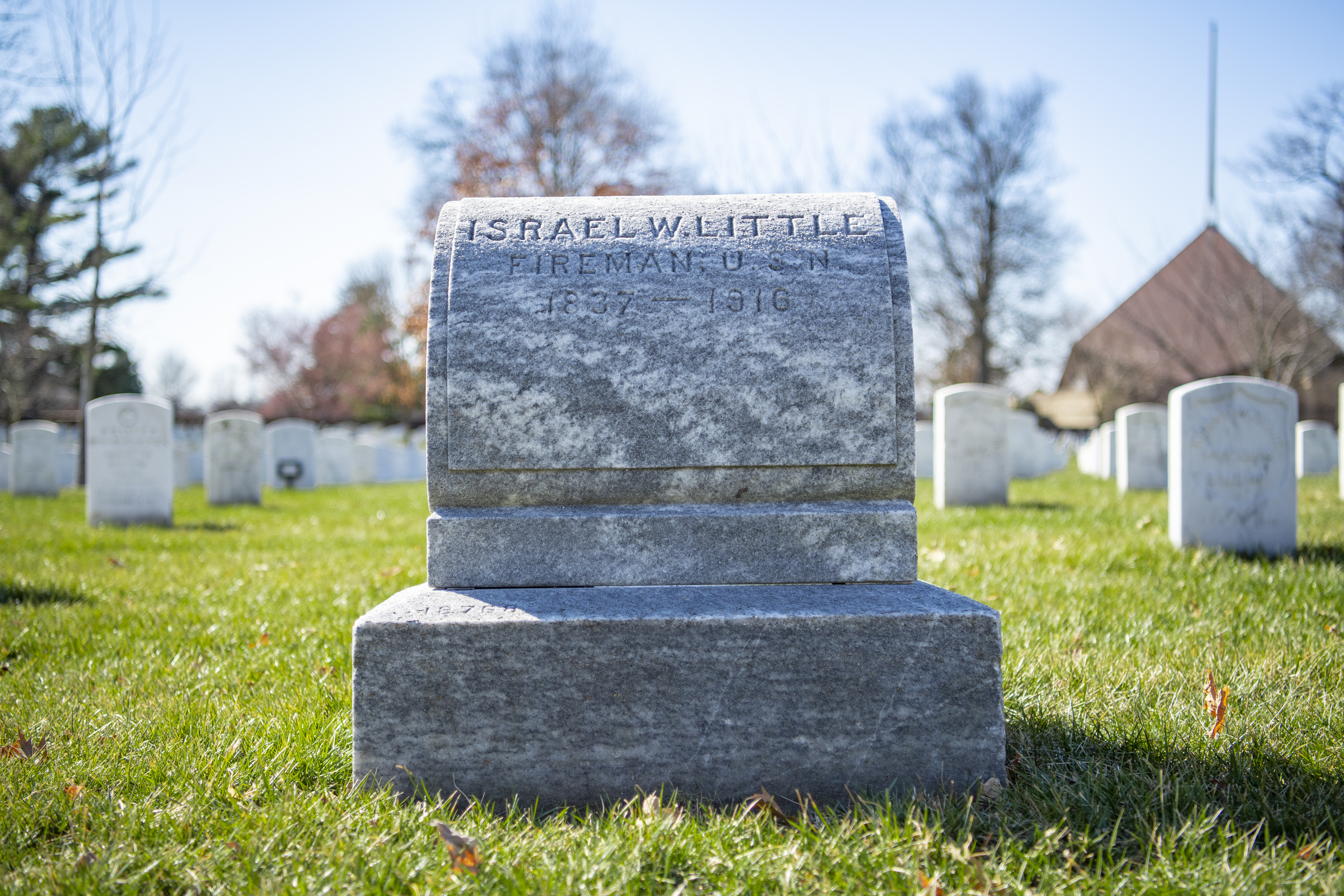
- Grave at Arlington National Cemetery
- Born: John Rush; February 21, 1837; Washington, D.C., US
- Died: April 29, 1916 (aged 79)
- Burial place: Arlington National Cemetery
- Military career
- Allegiance: Union
- Branch: Navy
- Rank: First Class Fireman
- Unit: U.S.S. Richmond
- Conflicts: American Civil War
- Awards: Medal of Honor

John Rush (February 21, 1837 – April 29, 1916) was a first class fireman in the Union Navy during the American Civil War, in which he earned the Medal of Honor. Rush was born in Washington, D.C., on February 21, 1837, and later changed his name to Israel W. Little.

== Military service ==
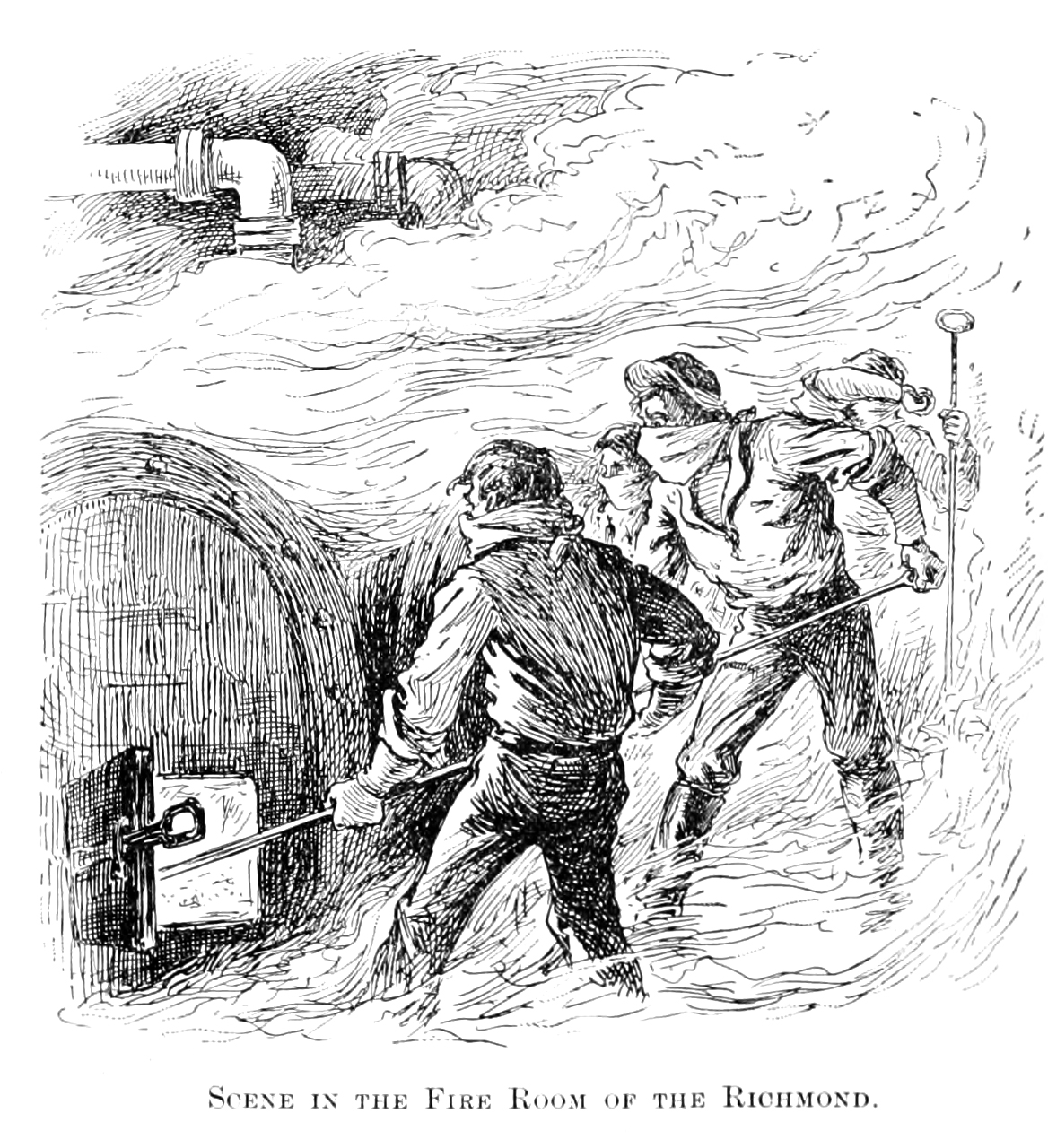
Illustration of Matthew McClelland, Joseph E. Vantine, John Rush and John Hickman on the USS Richmond in the attack on the Port Hudson batteries, March 14, 1863, the action that earned them the Medal of Honor

Rush entered Service in the US Navy from Washington, D.C., and eventually rose to the rank of first class fireman during the Civil War. He served on board the USS Richmond, which was dispatched towards Port Hudson, Louisiana, as a part of a squadron of Union vessels that attempted to strengthen the blockade of Confederate ports in the Gulf of Mexico. On March 14, 1863, he committed the act that would merit him the Medal of Honor. On that day, the squadron attempted to head up the river towards the enemy port, with their ship second in line. The ship was hit and damaged by a 6-inch solid rifle shot which shattered the starboards safety-valve chamber and port safety valve as it rounded a bend beneath the fortifications. The ship was forced to withdraw, as the steam room was filled with hot steam. After realising the ship was in danger of exploding, Fireman Joseph Vantine, Second Class Fireman John Hickman, First Class Fireman Mathew McClelland, and Fireman First Class John Rush, wrapped the wet cloth around their faces and entered the hot steam room to haul out the fires, relieving each other when they were overcome by heat. Their actions saved the ship, and led to each of them being awarded a Medal of Honor.

=== Medal of Honor citation ===
Rush was given his Medal of Honor through the War Department, General Orders No. 17 on July 10, 1863:

Serving on board the U.S.S. Richmond in the attack on Port Hudson, 14 March 1863. Damaged by a 6-inch solid rifle shot which shattered the starboard safety-valve chamber and also damaged the port safety valve, the fireroom of the Richmond immediately became filled with steam to place it in an extremely critical condition. Acting courageously in this crisis, Rush persisted in penetrating the steam-filled room in order to haul the hot fires of the furnaces, and continued this action until the gravity of the situation had been lessened.

== Post-war ==
After the Civil War, Rush returned to his home in Washington, D.C., changed his name to Israel W. Little, and married his wife, Elizabeth Kearney Little. He died on April 29, 1916, at the age of 79, and was buried at Arlington National Cemetery.
