= Dan Crary =

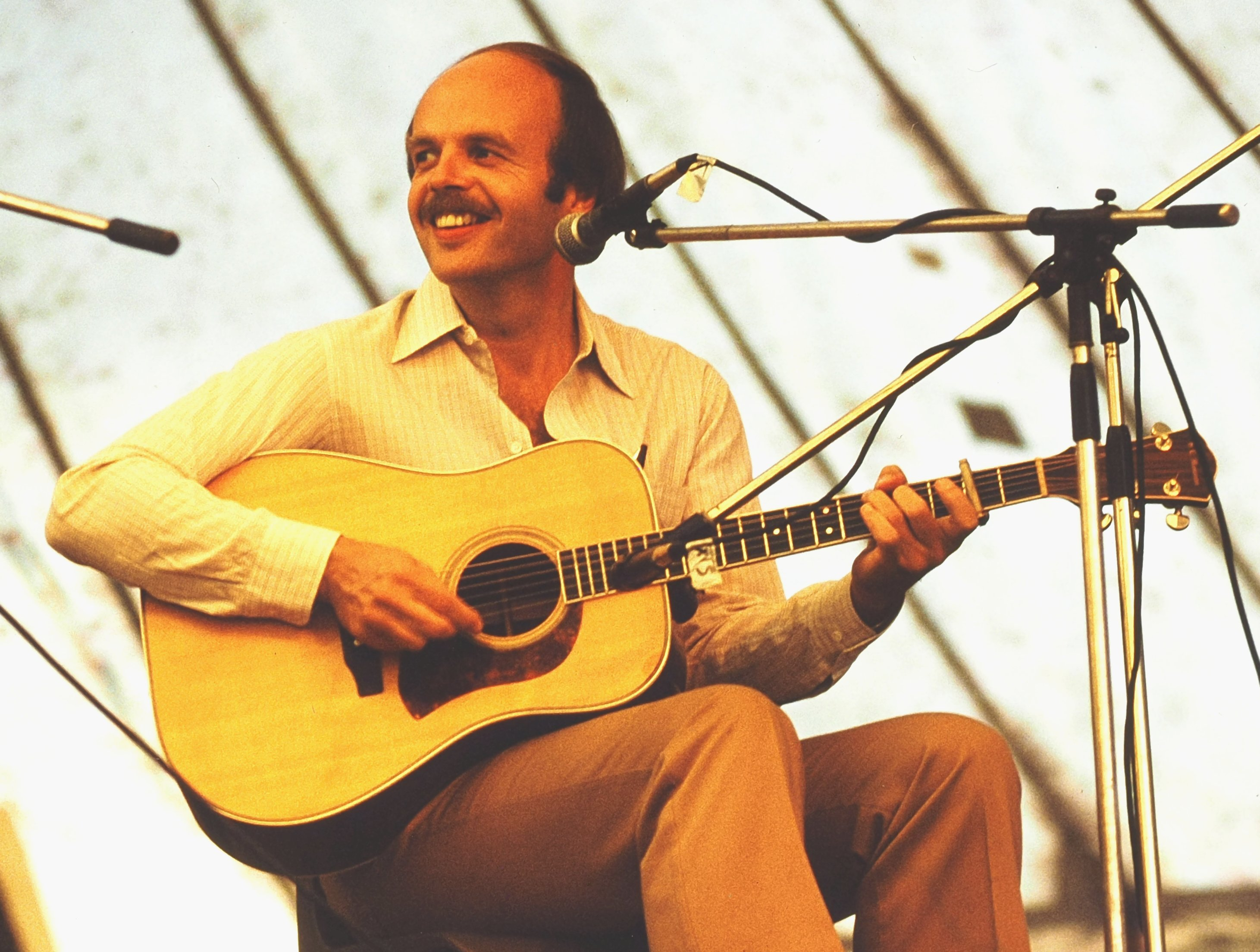
- Dan Crary at the 1981 Cambridge Folk Festival, UK

Background information
- Born: September 29, 1939 (age 86); Kansas City, Kansas, U.S.
- Genres: Bluegrass
- Occupations: Musician, singer
- Instrument: Guitar
- Years active: 1960–present
- Labels: Thunderation, Sugar Hill, Rounder
- Website: www.dancrary.com

Dan Crary (also known as Deacon Dan Crary) was born September 29, 1939, in Kansas City, Kansas, and is an American bluegrass guitarist. He helped re-establish flatpicked guitar as a prominent soloing bluegrass instrument. Crary is an innovator of the flatpicking style of guitar playing. He is also a Speech communications Professor at California State University, Fullerton. Crary categorizes himself as a "solo flatpicker" and has recorded several projects that feature him along with guests, usually other innovators of the guitar in all styles.

== The beginning ==
Crary started playing guitar at the age of 12. In 1957, after graduating from high school, he attended Chicago's Moody Bible Institute to study theology. In 1960, he moved to Lawrence, to study at the University of Kansas, he played guitar and sang in a trio called the Carltons. 1965, he went to San Francisco to study at the Golden Gate Baptist Theological Seminary — playing locally both with groups and solo to make a living.

== Louisville days ==
In 1967, with a degree in hand, he moved to Louisville, Kentucky, to continue his studies in pursuit of a doctorate of philosophy at the Southern Seminary. In Louisville, greatly interested in bluegrass music, he became friendly with various musicians, and in 1968, he became a co-founder of The Bluegrass Alliance. They soon became the house band in a local bar, known as the Red Dog Saloon. In 1970 he left that band and was replaced by Sam Bush and soon thereafter by Tony Rice. He also released "Bluegrass Guitar", one of the first bluegrass albums built around the acoustic guitar, in that same year.

== Back to California ==
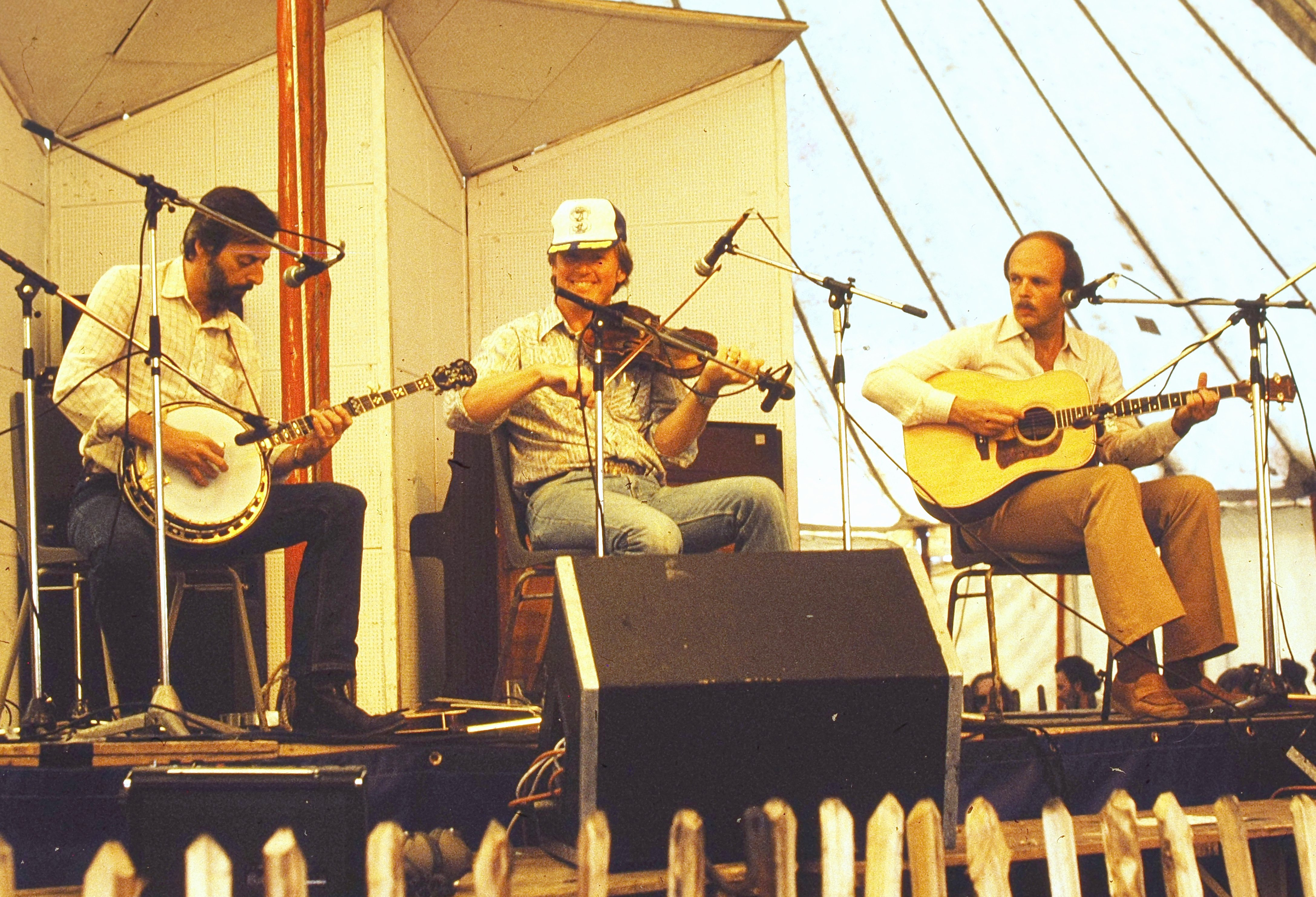
Berline, Crary and Hickman at Cambridge Folk Festival, UK, 1981. L-R: John Hickman, banjo; Byron Berline, fiddle; Dan Crary, guitar.

After leaving Louisville and adopting his first daughter, Jennifer in 1970 Crary went to Los Angeles and did not record again until late 1975 when he Byron Berline and Sundance and recorded a Country rock album by the same name. In 1977 he recorded "Lady's Fancy." a solo album that marked his return to Bluegrass. In the late 1970s, Berline teamed up once again with Crary and five string banjoist John Hickman for a tour of Japan. That trio went on to become known as BCH. By adding John Moore and Steve Spurgin to the original BCH, the trio formed the band California which won the IBMA Instrumental Group of the Year award in 1992, 1993 and 1994. California and BCH continue to play sporadic dates.

== Frets magazine ==
Crary hosted a monthly flat picking column in Frets magazine during the 1980s. A column that on a regular basis was, "the No. 1 or sometimes the No. 2 most-read column in the magazine".

== 1990s and beyond ==
In September 2006, Crary produced a theatrical musical history of the guitar called "Primal Twang: The Legacy of the Guitar." The production took place at the Birch North Park Theatre, in the community of North Park, San Diego, California. Primal Twang brought numerous innovators of the guitar together for a four night concert/theater event that has since been released as a DVD, including Mason Williams, Doc Watson, Albert Lee, Eric Johnson plus several others.

== Discography ==
Solo

- Bluegrass Guitar (American Heritage Music Corporation, 1970)
- Lady's Fancy (Rounder, 1977)
- Sweet Southern Girl (Sugar Hill, 1979)
- Guitar (Sugar Hill, 1983)
- Take A Step Over (Sugar Hill, 1989)
- Thunderation (Sugar Hill, Pamlico Sound, 1991)
- Jammed If I Do (Sugar Hill Records, 1994)
- Holiday Guitar (Sugar Hill, 1997)
- Renaissance Of The Steel String Guitar (Thunderation Music, 2003)

With Byron Berline and John Hickman

- Berline - Crary - Hickman (Sugar Hill, 1981)
- Night Run (Sugar Hill, 1984)
- BCH (Sugar Hill, 1986)
- Now They Are Four (Sugar Hill, 1989)
- Chambergrass (Sugar Hill, 2002)

With Lonnie Hoppers

- Crary & Hoppers And Their American Band (Pinecastle Records, 2000)

With Beppe Gambetta

- Synérgia (Felmay, 2001)

With Jacob Henry & Bill Jolliff, Sam Hill, and Sawtooth Mountain Boys

- Bluegrass... Live On The Radio! (Not On Label, 2002)
