= Alfred Hickman (disambiguation) =

Alfred Hickman was an English actor.

Alfred Hickman may also refer to:

- Sir Alfred Hickman, 1st Baronet (1830–1910), industrialist and Conservative politician
- Sir Alfred Edward Hickman, 2nd Baronet (1885–1947), of the Hickman baronets
- Sir (Alfred) Howard Whitby Hickman, 3rd Baronet (1920–1979), of the Hickman baronets
