= Hickam =

Hickam may refer to:

Surname

- Homer Hickam (born 1943), American author, Vietnam veteran, and a former NASA engineer
  - October Sky: The Homer Hickam Story, 1999 American biographical film
- Horace Meek Hickam (1885–1934), pioneer airpower advocate and officer in the United States Army Air Corps

Places

- Hickam Air Force Base (formerly Hickam Field), United States Air Force installation
- Hickam Housing, Hawaii, census-designated place in the City & County of Honolulu, Hawaii, United States

== See also ==
- Hick (disambiguation)
- Hickman (disambiguation)
- Whickham
