= Vietnam Presidential Unit Citation =

- (State of Vietnam Friendship Ribbon)
- Type: Unit award
- Presented by: South Vietnam
- Status: No longer awarded
- Established: By the State of Vietnam (1949–1955), August 15, 1950
- First award: 1955
- Final award: Unknown (Republic of Vietnam (1955–1975))
- Streamer

The Vietnam Presidential Unit Citation (Vietnamese: Huy chương Tổng thống) was a military unit award established by the State of Vietnam (1949–1955) as the State of Vietnam Friendship Ribbon on August 15, 1950. The Vietnam Presidential Unit Citation is considered obsolete since the Republic of Vietnam (South Vietnam) (1955–1975) no longer exists.

== History ==
The State of Vietnam Friendship Ribbon (a.k.a. State of Vietnam Ribbon of Friendship, Vietnam Presidential Unit Citation, and Republic of Vietnam Presidential Unit Citation) with gold frame, was awarded to the members of the U.S. Military Assistance Advisory Group who served in Indo-China during August and September 1954 and participated in humanitarian assistance to Vietnam. The unit award was approved for wear by the U.S. Department of the Army, General Orders No. 16, on February 28, 1955, which required that those wearing it on their uniforms (worn to the left of the Philippine or Republic of Korea Presidential Unit Citation) remove it prior to departure from the area; that requirement was rescinded by General Orders No. 5, February 11, 1958.

U.S. Navy personnel who are eligible for the Vietnam Presidential Unit Citation may wear the award. No Marine Corps personnel, however, are eligible for this award.

According to the U.S. Coast Guard, the Republic of Vietnam Presidential Unit Citation was also awarded throughout the war to certain U.S. military units deemed to have performed exceptional service to Vietnam. However, the RVN PUC is not mentioned in the 1967 RVN awards manual nor the Department of the Army Pamphlet DA 672-3 (Unit Citation Credit) as an authorized unit award.

== Appearance and wear ==
The ribbon is 1 3/8 inches (35 mm) wide and surrounded by a gold frame. No ribbon devices are authorized for wear with this award.

Foreign military unit members who were authorized to wear this unit award either wore the award on the right side of the uniform (e.g. U.S. Army) with any other same size unit award emblems or wore the slightly smaller size version of the award on the left side of the uniform (e.g. U.S. Navy, Marine Corps, Coast Guard, Air Force) with their other service ribbons.

== U.S. recipients ==
State of Vietnam Friendship Ribbon:

- Military Assistance Advisory Group, Indochina

Citation: During the months of August and September 1954, the members of the Military Assistance Advisory Group assisted to freedom from the terrors of Communist rule in their own territory of North and Central Vietnam, hundreds of thousands of men, women, and children. Thanks to the efficient and humanitarian assistance of the members of Military Assistance Advisory Group these refugees have been given an opportunity to start their lives anew in the free territories of Viet-Nam. The free people of Viet-Nam express their heartfelt gratitude for this unselfish manifestation of friendship and support.

- Task Force 90

== See also ==
- Orders, decorations, and medals of South Vietnam
