= Hickman County =

Hickman County is the name of several counties in the United States:

- Hickman County, Kentucky
- Hickman County, Tennessee
