= Hickman baronets of Gainsborough (1643) =

Escutcheon of the Hickman baronets of Gainsborough

The Hickman baronetcy, of Gainsborough in the County of Lincoln, was created in the Baronetage of England on 16 November 1643 for Willoughby Hickman. He was nephew of William Willoughby, 3rd Baron Willoughby of Parham and Royalist of the English Civil War.

The 2nd Baronet represented East Retford in the House of Commons. The 3rd Baronet sat as member of parliament for Kingston upon Hull, East Retford and Lincolnshire.

The title became extinct on the death of the 5th Baronet in 1781.

== Hickman baronets, of Gainsborough (1643) ==
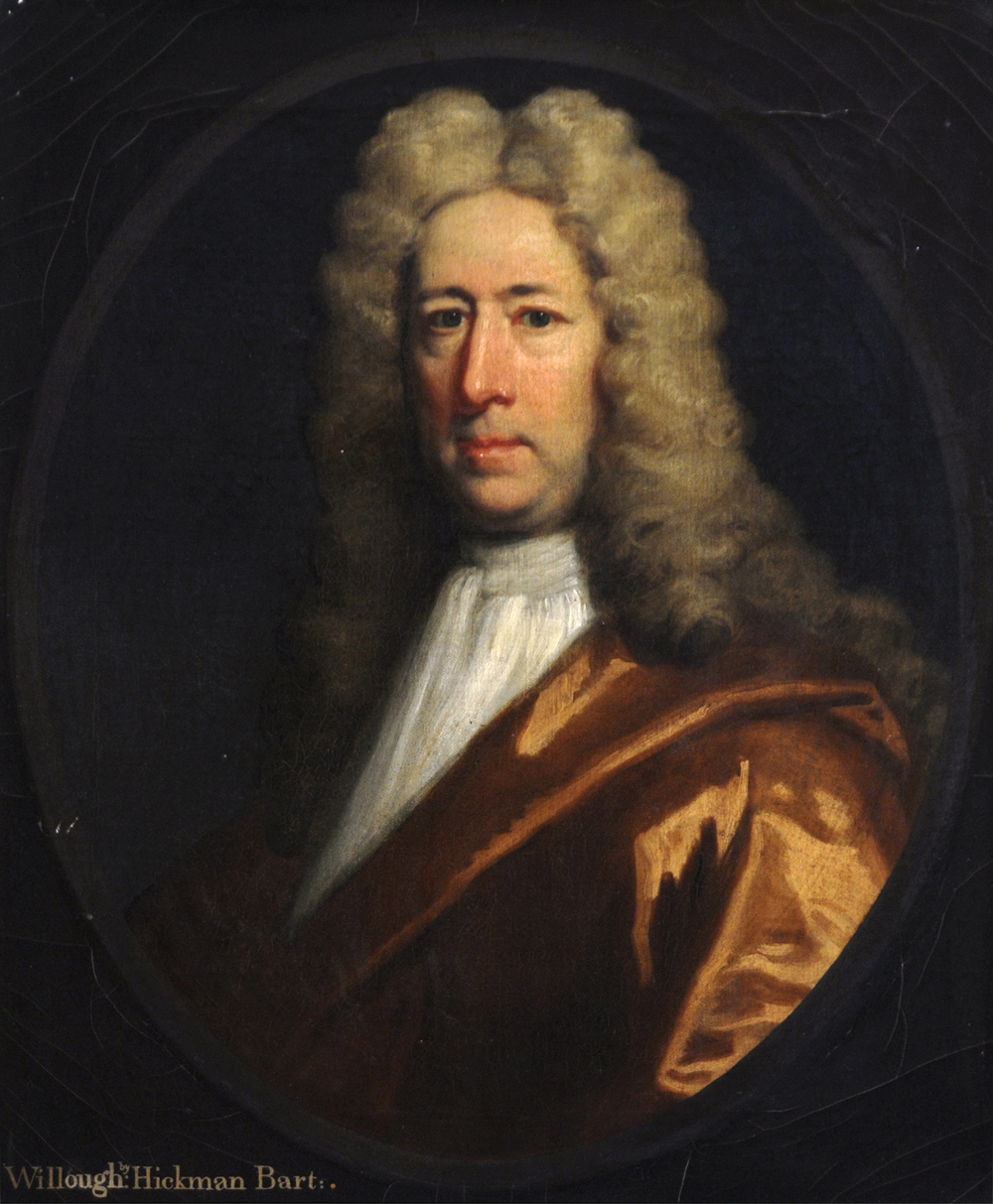
Sir Willoughby Hickman, 3rd Baronet

- Sir Willoughby Hickman, 1st Baronet (1604–1650)
- Sir William Hickman, 2nd Baronet (1629–1682)
- Sir Willoughby Hickman, 3rd Baronet (1659–1720)
- Sir Nevile Hickman, 4th Baronet (1701–1733)
- Sir Nevile George Hickman, 5th Baronet (died 1781)
