= Hickman Elementary School =

Hickman Elementary School may refer to:

- Hickman Elementary School - San Diego Unified School District - San Diego, California
- Hickman Elementary School - Metro Nashville Public Schools - Nashville, Tennessee
- Hickman Elementary School - Garland Independent School District - Garland, Texas
