= USS Hickman =

Cargo ship of the United States Navy

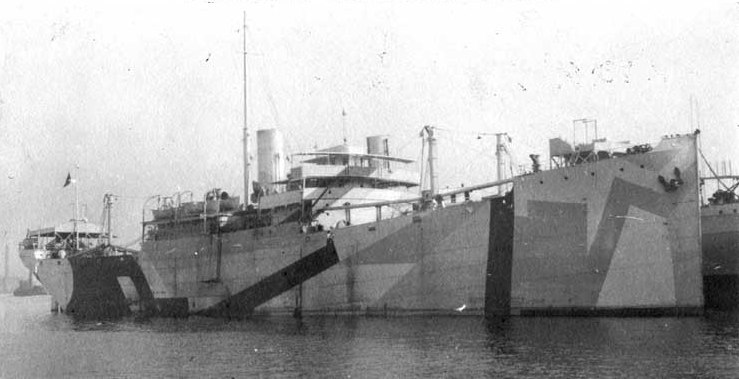
- USS Hickman (ID-3554), probably at the time of her completion and delivery to the United States Navy in mid-November 1918. She is painted in dazzle camouflage.

History

United States
- Name: USS Hickman
- Namesake: Previous name retained
- Builder: Standard Steamboat Company or Standard Steamship Company, New York City
- Launched: 10 July 1918
- Completed: 14 November 1918
- Acquired: 16 November 1918
- Commissioned: 16 November 1918
- Decommissioned: 5 March 1919
- Fate: Transferred to United States Shipping Board 1919
- Notes: In Shipping Board custody as SS Hickman 1919-1932; Scrapped 1932

General characteristics
- Type: Cargo ship
- Tonnage: 5,121 Gross register tons
- Displacement: 10,562 tons (normal)
- Length: 377 ft (115 m)
- Beam: 52 ft (16 m)
- Draft: 23 ft 10 in (7.26 m)
- Propulsion: One 2,500-indicated horsepower (1.864-megawatt) steam engine, one shaft
- Speed: 10.5 knots
- Complement: 90

USS Hickman (ID-3554) was a United States Navy cargo ship in commission from 1918 to 1919.

== Construction, acquisition, and commissioning ==
Hickman was built in 1918 as the commercial cargo ship SS Hickman for the United States Shipping Board by the Standard Steamboat Company or Standard Steamship Company at Shooters Island, New York. She was completed on 14 November 1918, three days after the 11 November 1918 Armistice with Germany brought World War I to an end. On 16 November 1918, the Shipping Board transferred her to the U.S. Navy, which assigned her the naval registry identification number 3554 and commissioned her the same day at Shooters Island as USS Hickman (ID-3554).

== Operational history ==
Assigned to the Naval Overseas Transportation Service, Hickman loaded cargo at New York City and departed for France before the end of November 1918, but was forced to turn back due to boiler and steering problems. After repairs, she once again departed New York on 7 December 1918. She arrived at La Pallice Roads in France on 22 December 1918 after a rough transatlantic crossing during which she lost one of her crew overboard. She unloaded cargo at La Pallice and, after taking on a few passengers bound for the United States and some United States Army cargo, got underway on 27 January 1919 and arrived at New York City on 17 February 1919 after an even rougher passage during which winds she encountered in the North Atlantic Ocean reached hurricane force.

At New York, Hickman received orders to load another cargo, but these orders were cancelled and she instead was selected for decommissioning.

== Decommissioning and disposal ==
Hickman was decommissioned at New York City on 5 March 1919, and the Navy returned her to the U.S. Shipping Board. Once again SS Hickman, she remained in the custody of the Shipping Board until she was scrapped in 1932.
