= David Emanuel Hickman =

United States Army soldier

- Born: January 16, 1988; Greensboro, North Carolina, U.S
- Died: November 14, 2011 (aged 23); Baghdad, Iraq
- Military career
- Allegiance: United States
- Branch: United States Army
- Service years: 2009–2011
- Rank: Specialist
- Units: B Co, 2nd BN, 325 AIR, 82nd Airborne Division
- Awards: Combat Infantryman Badge (CIB) Expert Infantryman Badge (EIB); Basic Parachutist Badge; Bronze Star Medal; Purple Heart Medal; National Defense Service Medal Iraq Campaign Medal

David Emanuel Hickman (January 16, 1988 – November 14, 2011) was the last U.S. soldier killed in the Iraq War.

== Early life and education ==
David Hickman was born on January 16, 1988, and was a lifelong resident of Greensboro, North Carolina. He graduated from Northeast High School in 2006. He was an all conference outside linebacker for the Rams football team and served as team captain. Hickman was also an accomplished black belt in the art of Taekwondo. He joined the military in 2009 after a short college stint at Ferrum College in Virginia.

== Career ==
His military awards and decorations prior to included the National Defense Service Medal, Iraq Campaign Medal, the Global War on Terrorism Service Medal, Army Service Ribbon, Expert Infantry Badge, and the Parachutist Badge. His awards to come are the Combat Infantry Badge, The Good Conduct Medal, the Bronze Star, and the Purple Heart. Hickman held the rank of specialist, and was a member of Bravo Company, 2nd Battalion, 325th AIR of the 82nd Airborne Division.

While on a police-type patrol in Baghdad, Hickman was killed by a roadside bomb that tore through his armored truck on November 14, 2011.
