= William Hickman House =

Historic house in Kentucky, United States

- U.S. National Register of Historic Places
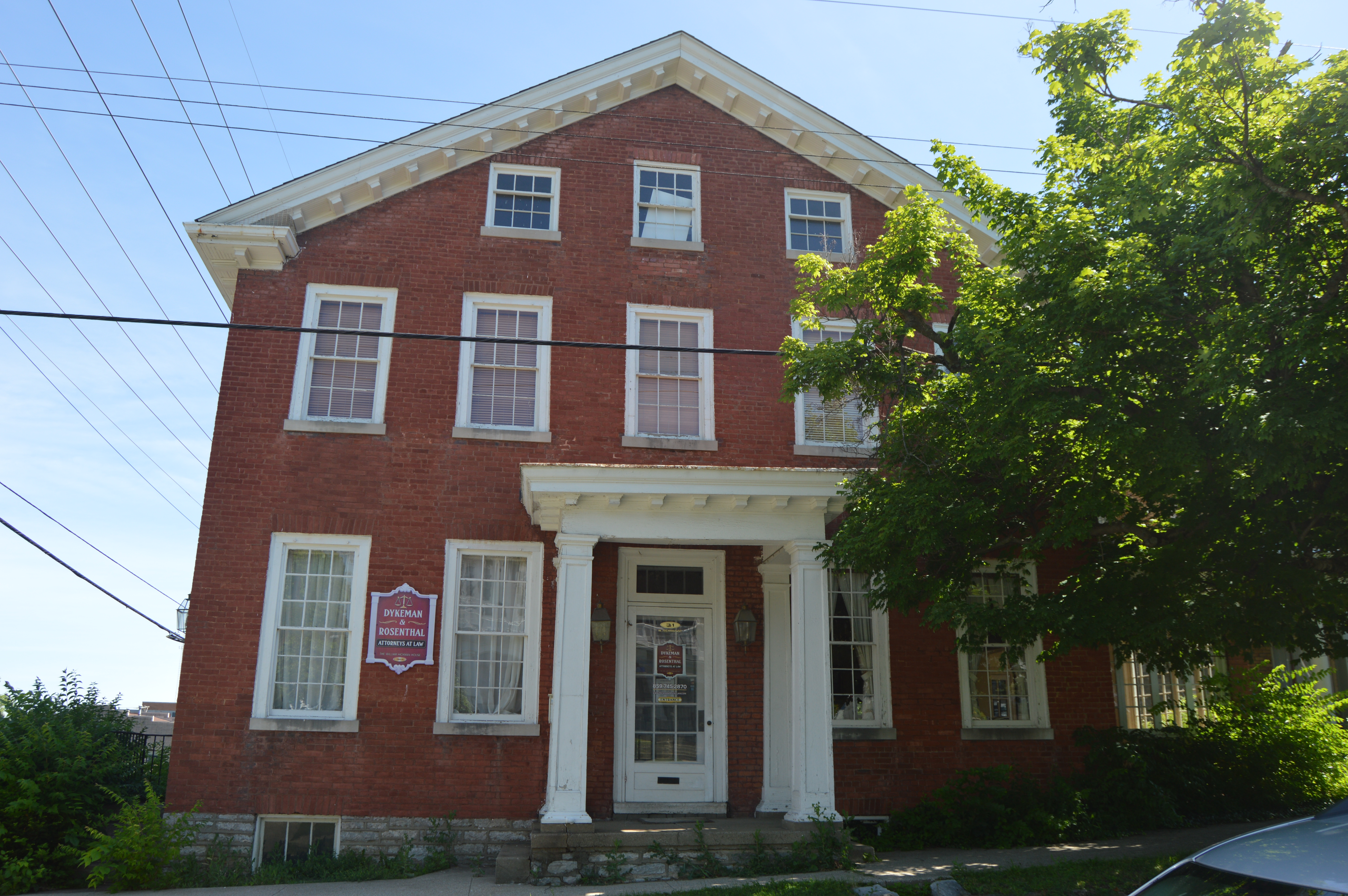
- Front of the house

- Location within Kentucky Location within the United States
- Location: 31 W. Hickman St., Winchester, Kentucky
- Coordinates: 37°59′27″N 84°10′48″W
- Area: 0.4 acres (0.16 ha)
- Built: c.1814
- Architect: Couchman, John
- Architectural style: Federal
- NRHP reference No.: 82001554
- Added to NRHP: November 24, 1982

The William Hickman House located at 31 West Hickman Street, is a brick house in Winchester, the county seat of Clark County, Kentucky. It was listed on the National Register of Historic Places in 1982.

Its brick on the west facade is laid in Flemish bond; it is common bond elsewhere.

Built by John Couchman in 1814, it was originally intended to be a tavern, but before he opened it, it was bought by local cabinet maker William Hickman. Six generations of Hickmans lived in the house, which remained a residence until it was bought by the Clark County Bank in 1982. In 1990 it was bought by Dykeman & Rosenthal, a law firm in Winchester.
