= Anton Leo Hickmann =

- Born: 23 March 1834; Terezín, Bohemia, Austria-Hungary
- Died: 18 July 1916 (aged 82); Vienna, Austria-Hungary
- Citizenship: Austrian
- Education: University of Prague
- Known for: Geographisch-statistischer Taschen-Atlas von Österreich-Ungarn
- Scientific career
- Fields: Geography and statistics

Anton Leo Hickmann (23 March 1834 – 18 July 1906) was an Austrian geographer and statistician.

== Biography ==
He was born on 23 March 1834 in Theresienstadt, Bohemia (now Terezín) and died on 18 July 1906 in Vienna.

Hickmann studied geography in Prague University. After completing his habilitation, he studied languages and economics. After a brief function as secretary of the Chamber of Commerce in Eger, Hickmann became professor at Reichenberg, where he would work for about 30 years. He was one of the first to become a popular statistician.
