= Jay Hickman (comedian) =

American comedian (1955–1993)

Jay Hickman (April 19, 1955 – March 13, 1993) was an American comedian known for his often-bawdy material. Despite his death in the early 1990s, his legacy of Southern-based material still enjoys a cult following.

== Early life ==
Hickman was born in Winston-Salem, North Carolina and was known as a "truck-stop" comedian, which denotes a genre of comedy that was meant to appeal to a Southern grass roots demographic and whose material was marketed mainly through truck stops. He started his career at the young age of 15 when he won a North Carolina state talent show, sponsored by the Women's Club of America. Later, the great comedian Jackie Gleason saw him perform, and one of Gleason's friends quickly hired the unknown comic to perform on cruise ships, eventually progressing to fame performing in strip clubs throughout the Southeastern United States.

== Career ==
It is from those venues that he created and enjoyed a cult, underground following of fans who mainly owned his self-produced cassette tapes of those strip club performances which were self-distributed by him prior to his record deal with Laughing Hyena Records, the same label which discovered comedian Jeff Foxworthy. A total of 7 CDs were released and are still available through the company's web site. Hickman also appeared on HBO, Showtime, and The Playboy Channel; performed on the Hee Haw television show; opened shows for comedians Jackie Gleason and Sammy Davis Jr.; and opened concerts for musical artists Tom Jones, Liza Minnelli, Tanya Tucker, Aretha Franklin, Mel Torme, Anita Baker, Lee Greenwood and George Jones.

=== Popular material ===
Perhaps his most enduring story was called "Boat Ride", about a male character with a harelip who takes girls out on a boat ride in order to gain sexual favors ("put out or swim" or as Jay said it, "Put out, or thwim!"), a trick which ultimately turns against him.

== Death and legacy ==
Grave Marker as of Oct 2024

Hickman was diagnosed with liver disease in the 1980s and died at 37 in 1993. He is buried at Southern Palms Memorial Gardens Cemetery in Myrtle Beach, South Carolina.

Despite his lack of widespread notoriety, his following continues on due to the commitment of Laughing Hyena Records to honor Hickman's last request, for them and only them to continue marketing his CDs for future generations to hear per the testimony of his best friend and company founder, Arnie Hoffman, as found on the inner sleeves of Hickman's CDs.

== Personal life ==
Jay was married to Julie Hickman, who regularly attended his standup comedy performances at the Cheetah III, a strip joint in Fort Lauderdale, Florida in 1979.

== Albums ==
- Duke of Dirt (1983) Laughing Hyena Records
- Boat Ride (1983) Laughing Hyena Records
- Making People Laugh (1985) Laughing Hyena Records
- The Macho Man (1986) Laughing Hyena Records
- Playing Truck Driver (1988) Laughing Hyena Records
- Comedy's Bad Boy (1989) Laughing Hyena Records
- Don't Hold Nothing Back (1992) Laughing Hyena Records
