= James Hickman (disambiguation) =

James Hickman (born 1976) is a British swimmer.

James or Jim Hickman may also refer to:

- James C. Hickman (1927–2006), American actuary
- Jim Hickman (1910s outfielder) (1892–1958), American professional baseball player
- Jim Hickman (1960s outfielder) (1937–2016), American professional baseball player
- Jim Hickman (racing driver) (1943–1982), American racecar driver
