= Hickman baronets =

Set index for Hickman baronets

There have been two baronetcies created for persons with the surname Hickman, one in the Baronetage of England and one in the Baronetage of the United Kingdom.

- Hickman baronets of Gainsborough (1643)
- Hickman baronets of Wightwick (1903)
