= John Hickman (Medal of Honor) =

American Civil War Medal of Honor recipient (1837-1904)

- Born: March 2, 1836; Blair County, Pennsylvania, US
- Died: December 24, 1904 (aged 68); Altoona, Pennsylvania, US
- Burial place: Calvary Cemetery
- Military career
- Allegiance: Union
- Branch: Navy
- Rank: Second Class Fireman
- Unit: USS Richmond
- Conflicts: American Civil War
- Awards: Medal of Honor

John Pierce Hickman (March 2, 1836 – December 24, 1904) was a Second Class Fireman in the Union Navy during the American Civil War, in which he earned the Medal of Honor for service aboard the USS Richmond. Hickman was born in Blair County, Pennsylvania, and lived in that county for his entire life.

== Military service ==
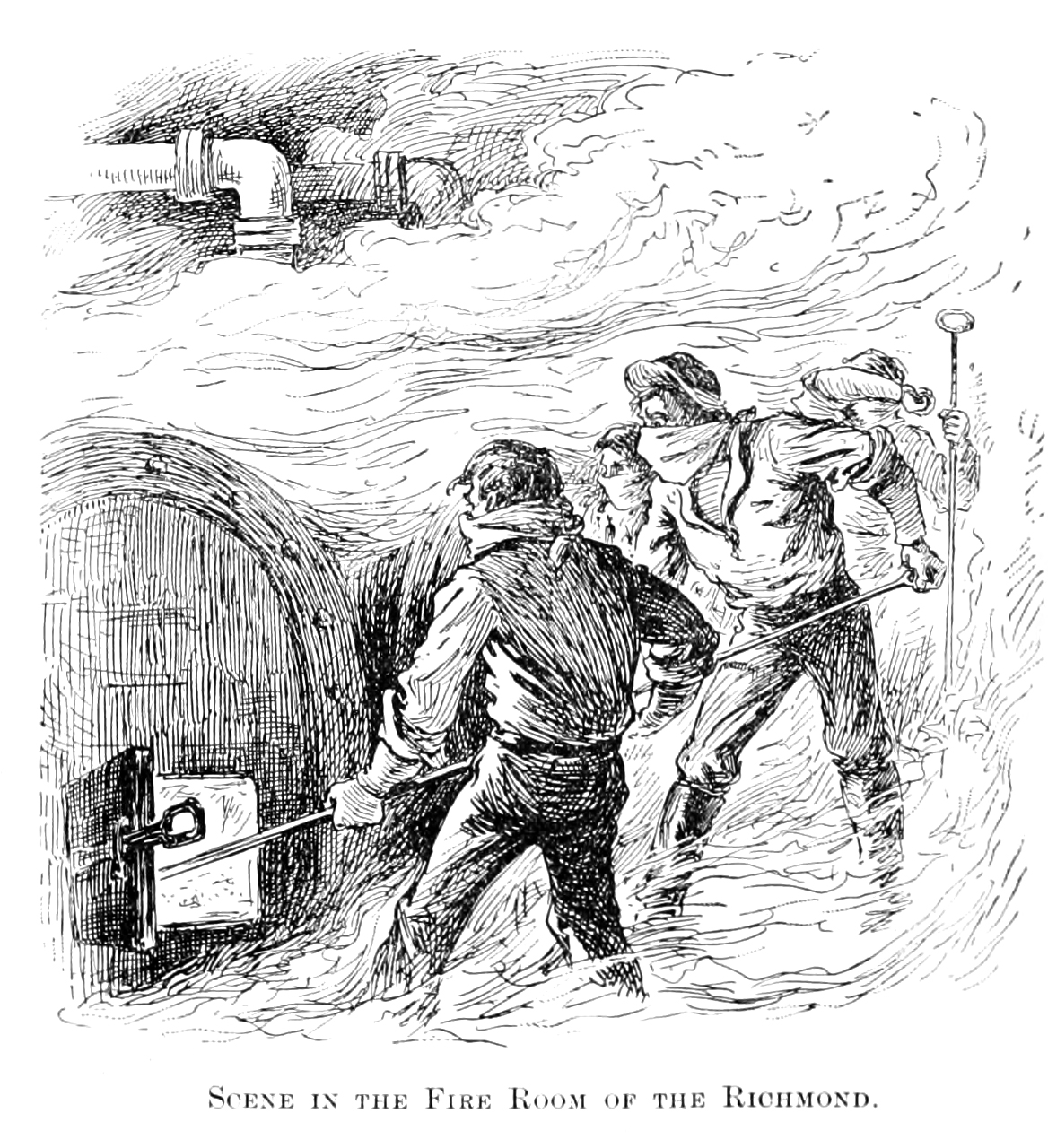
Illustration of Matthew McClelland, Joseph E. Vantine, John Rush and John Hickman on the USS Richmond in the attack on the Port Hudson batteries, March 14, 1863 — the action that earned each of them the Medal of Honor

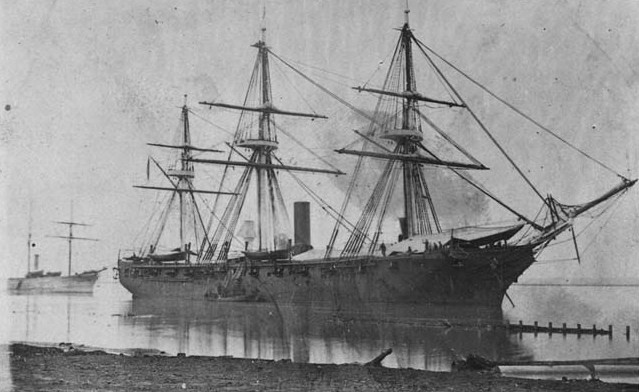
Hickman served on the USS Richmond, pictured at Baton Rouge in 1863

He entered Service in the US Navy from Pennsylvania, and eventually rose to the rank of Second Class Fireman during the Civil War. He served on board the USS Richmond, which was dispatched towards Port Hudson, Louisiana, as a part of a squadron of Union vessels that attempted to strengthen the blockade of Confederate ports in the Gulf of Mexico. On March 14, 1863, he committed the act that would merit him the Medal of Honor. On that day, the squadron attempted to head up the river towards the enemy port, with their ship second in line. The ship was hit and damaged by a 6-inch solid rifle shot which shattered the starboards safety-valve chamber and port safety valve as it rounded a bend beneath the fortifications. The ship was forced to withdraw, as the steam room was filled with hot steam. After realising the ship was in danger of exploding, Fireman Joseph Vantine, Second Class Fireman John Hickman, First Class Fireman Matthew McClelland, and Fireman First Class John Rush, wrapped the wet cloth around their faces and entered the hot steam room to haul out the fires, relieving each other when they were overcome by heat. Their actions saved the ship, and led to each of them being awarded a Medal of Honor.

=== Medal of Honor citation ===
Hickman was given his medal of honor through the War Department, General Orders No. 17 on July 10, 1863:

Served on board the U.S.S. Richmond in the attack on Port Hudson, 14 March 1863. Damaged by a 6-inch solid rifle shot which shattered the starboard safety-valve chamber and also damaged the port safety-valve, the fireroom of the U.S.S. Richmond immediately became filled with steam to place it in an extremely critical condition. Acting courageously in this crisis, Hickman persisted in penetrating the steam-filled room in order to haul the hot fires of the furnaces and continued this action until the gravity of the situation had been lessened.

== Later life ==
After the Civil War, Hickman returned to his home in Blair County, Pennsylvania, and worked for many years as a freight conductor on the Pennsylvania Railroad. He died on December 24, 1904, and was buried at Calvary Cemetery in Altoona, Pennsylvania.
