= John Hickman (musician) =

American five-string banjo player (1942–2021)

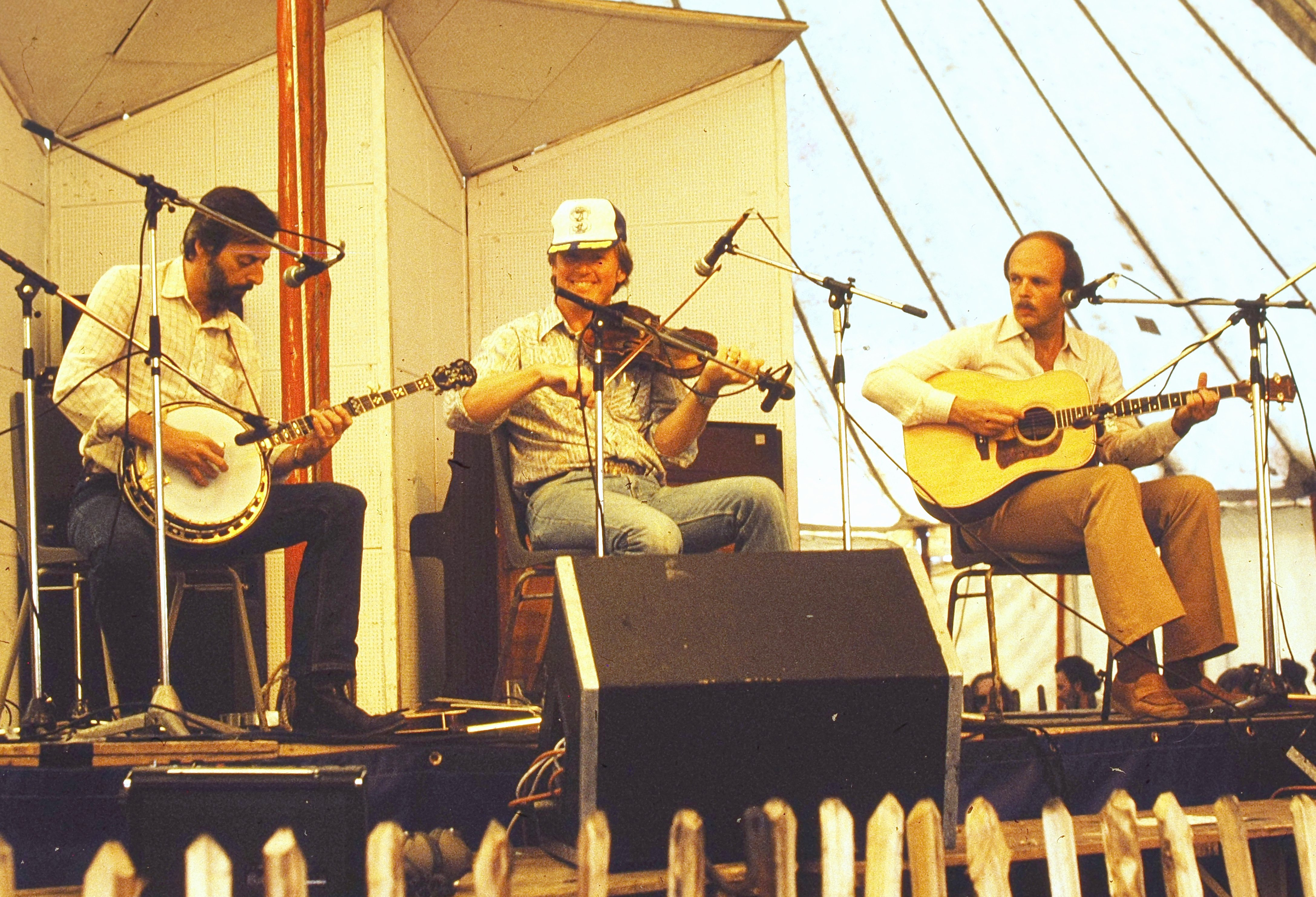
- Berline, Crary and Hickman at Cambridge Folk Festival, UK, 1981. L-R: John Hickman, banjo; Byron Berline, fiddle; Dan Crary, guitar.

Background information
- Born: John Hickman; October 7, 1942
- Died: May 11, 2021 (aged 78)
- Genres: Bluegrass rock
- Occupation: Musician
- Instrument: Banjo
- Years active: 1960s–2021

John Hickman (October 7, 1942 – May 11, 2021) was an American five-string banjo player.

Hickman was born in Columbus, Ohio. He started playing the banjo at the age of 13.

In 1969, he moved to California, and began performing together with fiddle player Byron Berline and guitarist Dan Crary.

He released the album Don’t Mean Maybe in 1978.

== Discography ==
Solo

- Don’t Mean Maybe (Rounder, 1978)

With Byron Berline

- Double Trouble (Sugar Hill, 1986)

With Byron Berline and Dan Crary

- Berline - Crary - Hickman (Sugar Hill, 1981)
- Night Run (Sugar Hill, 1984)
- BCH (Sugar Hill, 1986)
- Now They Are Four (Sugar Hill, 1989)
- Chambergrass (comp) (Sugar Hill, 2002)
