= USS Princeton (1851) =

Gunboat of the United States Navy

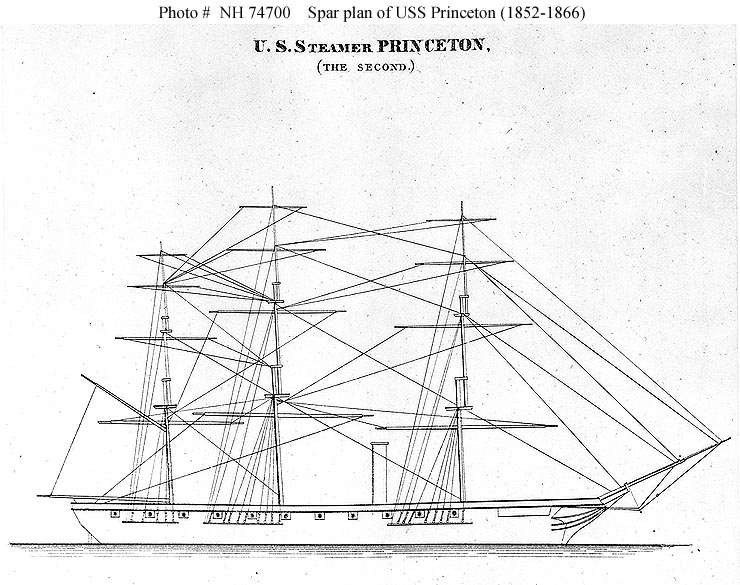

History

United States
- Laid down: June 1851
- Launched: October 1851
- Commissioned: 18 May 1852
- Decommissioned: 10 June 1855
- Out of service: 9 October 1866

General characteristics
- Displacement: 1,370 tons
- Length: 177 ft 6 in (54.10 m)
- Beam: 32 ft 8 in (9.96 m)
- Draft: 25 ft 9 in (7.85 m)
- Propulsion: steam engine; screw-propelled
- Speed: 8 knots (15 km/h; 9.2 mph)
- Armament: six 32-pounder carronades; four 8 in (203 mm) 58 cwt. smoothbore guns

USS Princeton was a large 1,370-ton steamer with powerful guns, some of whose timbers were those from the first USS Princeton, the U.S. Navy's first screw steam warship.

Princeton was originally assigned to sail with Admiral Matthew C. Perry's squadron to Japan, but broke down due to boiler problems just as the voyage was to start. She was laid up prior to the start of the American Civil War, but, when that war broke out, she was reactivated as a receiving ship at Philadelphia, Pennsylvania.

== Service history ==
The second Navy ship to be so named, Princeton, a clipper-built ship, was laid down in June 1851 at Boston Navy Yard; launched in October 1851; sponsored by Lt. Edward R. Thompson; and commissioned 18 May 1852 at Boston, Massachusetts, Comdr. Sidney Smith Lee in command. Some of the usable timbers of the first Princeton were incorporated in the new hull of the second Princeton. Upon completion of the hull at Boston, Princeton proceeded 19 May 1852 to Baltimore, Maryland, where her machinery was installed at Vulcan Iron Works. New boilers and propellers were added but the original engines of "Ericsson semi-cylinder" design were retained. She remained at Baltimore until 18 November when she departed for Norfolk, Virginia, arriving the same day. Princeton was fitted out for duty with Commodore Matthew C. Perry's Squadron in the Far East and sailed 18 November 1852 from Baltimore rendezvousing with Perry's flagship, the USS Mississippi off Annapolis, Maryland. On the way down the Chesapeake Bay, she developed boiler trouble and remained at Norfolk while Mississippi continued on without her. She decommissioned 1 January 1853 at Norfolk.

From July to September 1853 Princeton served as flagship of the Eastern Squadron under the command of Commodore William Shubrick, which was responsible for protecting fisheries off the coast of Nova Scotia. Princeton next returned to New York City upon completion of this assignment, where she remained until 31 October 1854 and then got underway for duty in the Gulf of Mexico and the West Indies. There she spent several weeks searching for the ill-fated USS Albany, a sail-powered sloop of war lost with 210 hands. She returned to Norfolk 10 June 1855 and was placed in ordinary. In 1857 Princeton was taken to Philadelphia, Pennsylvania, where she was stationed as a receiving ship until 9 October 1866. Princeton was sold in 1866.
