= David Henry Hickman =

American politician

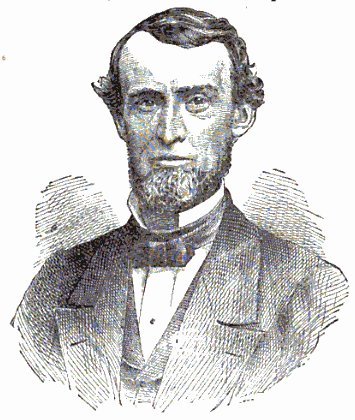
- Born: November 21, 1821; Bourbon County, Kentucky
- Died: June 25, 1869; Columbia, Missouri
- Occupations: Businessman, Educator, and Legislator

David Henry Hickman (1821–1869) was a businessman, educator, and legislator from Columbia, Missouri, United States. He was a member of the Missouri General Assembly from 1838 to 1842 and helped compose legislation requiring the state to support public 'common schools' with at least twenty-five percent of the state's revenue. He was also instrumental in the founding and development of Stephens College and served as a curator of the University of Missouri. David H. Hickman High School was built on his country estate in 1927 and named after him. He is buried in the Columbia Cemetery.
