= List of American Civil War Medal of Honor recipients: M–P =

This is a complete alphabetical list (M to P) of Medal of Honor recipients during the Civil War. Many of the awards during the Civil War were for capturing or saving regimental flags. During the Civil War, regimental flags served as the rallying point for the unit, and guided the unit's movements. Loss of the flag could greatly disrupt a unit, and could have a greater effect than the death of the commanding officer.

== Medal of Honor ==
The Medal of Honor is the highest military decoration awarded by the United States government and is bestowed on a member of the United States armed forces who distinguishes himself "...conspicuously by gallantry and intrepidity at the risk of his life above and beyond the call of duty while engaged in an action against an enemy of the United States..." Due to the nature of this medal, it is commonly presented posthumously.

Recipients are listed alphabetically by last name. Posthumous receipt is denoted by an asterisk.

== M ==
Recipients are listed alphabetically by last name. Posthumous receipt is denoted by an asterisk.

This along with the *, indicates that the Medal of Honor was awarded posthumously

Image	Name	Service	Rank	Unit/Command	Place of action	Date of action	Notes
Head and shoulders of a white man with wavy hair and a mustache, wearing a double-breasted military jacket with shoulder cords and two medals hanging from ribbons on the left breast.	Arthur MacArthur, Jr.	Army	First Lieutenant	24th Wisconsin Volunteer Infantry Regiment	Battle of Missionary Ridge, Tennessee	Nov 25, 1863	Father of General Douglas MacArthur, who also was awarded a Medal of Honor
—	James Machon	Navy	Boy	(United States Navy) USS Brooklyn	Aboard USS Brooklyn, Battle of Mobile Bay	Aug 5, 1864	On board USS Brooklyn during successful attacks against Fort Morgan, rebel gunboats and the ram Tennessee in Mobile Bay, on 5 August 1864.
—	Alexander Mack	Navy	Captain of the Top	(United States Navy) USS Brooklyn	Aboard USS Brooklyn, Battle of Mobile Bay	Aug 5, 1864	On board USS Brooklyn during successful attacks against Fort Morgan, rebel gunboats and the ram Tennessee in Mobile Bay, on 5 August 1864.
—	John Mack	Navy	Seaman	(United States Navy) USS Hendrick Hudson (1859)	Aboard USS Hendrick Hudson (1859)	Mar 5, 1865 – Mar 6, 1865	As seaman on board USS Hendrick Hudson, St. Marks, Florida, 5 and 6 March 1865, Mack served with the Army in charge of Navy howitzers during the attack on St. Marks and, throughout this fierce engagement, made remarkable efforts in assisting transport of the gun.
Framed portrait of a white man with a mustache and long beard wearing a flat-topped cap and a military jacket with four large medals hanging from ribbons on the left breast.	John F. Mackie	Marine Corps	Corporal	(United States Marine Corps) USS Galena	Aboard USS Galena, Drewry's Bluff	May 15, 1862	Serving aboard USS Galena Mackie was the first Marine to receive the Medal of Honor.
—	Michael Madden	Army	Private	(New York (state)) Company K, 42nd New York Volunteer Infantry Regiment	Masons Island, Maryland	Sep 3, 1861	Assisted a wounded comrade to the riverbank and, under heavy fire of the enemy, swam with him across a branch of the Potomac to the Union lines.
—	William Madden	Navy	Coal Heaver	(United States Navy) USS Brooklyn	Aboard USS Brooklyn, Battle of Mobile Bay	Aug 5, 1864	On board USS Brooklyn during successful attacks against Fort Morgan, rebel gunboats and the ram Tennessee in Mobile Bay, on 5 August 1864.
—	James Madison	Army	Sergeant	(New York (state)) Company E, 8th New York Volunteer Cavalry Regiment	Battle of Waynesboro, Virginia	Mar 2, 1865	Recapture of General Crook's headquarters flag.
—	William Magee	Army	Drummer	Company C, 33rd New Jersey Volunteer Infantry	Third Battle of Murfreesboro, Tenn.	Dec 5, 1864	In a charge, was among the first to reach a battery of the enemy and, with one or two others, mounted the artillery horses and took two guns into the Union lines.
—	Jeremiah Mahoney	Army	Sergeant	Company A, 29th Massachusetts Volunteer Infantry Regiment	Battle of Fort Sanders, Knoxville, Tennessee	November 29, 1863	Capture of flag of 17th Mississippi Infantry (C.S.A.).
—	Harry J. Mandy	Army	First Sergeant	(New York (state)) Company B, 4th New York Provisional Cavalry Regiment	Battle of Front Royal, Virginia	Aug 15, 1864	Capture of flag of 3d Virginia Infantry (C.S.A.).
—	Richard C. Mangam	Army	Private	(New York (state)) Company H, 148th Regiment New York Volunteer Infantry	Hatcher's Run, Third Battle of Petersburg, Virginia	Apr 2, 1865	Capture of flag of 8th Mississippi Infantry (C.S.A.)
joseph s manning moh winner	Joseph S. Manning	Army	Private	Company K, 29th Massachusetts Volunteer Infantry Regiment	Battle of Fort Sanders, Knoxville, Tennessee	November 29, 1863	Capture of flag of 17th Mississippi Infantry (C.S.A.).
William Marland MoH winner	William Marland	Army	First Lieutenant	2nd Massachusetts Battery	Battle of Grand Coteau, Louisiana	Nov 3, 1863	After having been surrounded by the enemy's cavalry, his support having surrendered, he ordered a charge and saved the section of the battery that was under his command.
Charles D Marquette MoH winner	Charles Marquette	Army	Sergeant	Company F, 93rd Pennsylvania Infantry Regiment	Third Battle of Petersburg, Virginia	Apr 2, 1865	Sergeant Marquette, although wounded, was one of the first to plant colors on the enemy's breastworks.
Albert Marsh MoH winner	Albert Marsh	Army	Sergeant	(New York (state)) Company B, 64th New York Volunteer Infantry Regiment	Battle of Spotsylvania Court House, Virginia	May 12, 1864	Captured the enemy flag
Head and shoulders of a young white man with thick, neatly combed hair, wearing a dark suit and tie.	Charles H. Marsh	Army	Private	Company D, 1st Connecticut	Back Creek Valley, Virginia	Jul 31, 1864	Capture of flag and its bearer.
—	George Marsh	Army	Sergeant	Company D, 104th Illinois Volunteer Infantry Regiment	Elk River, Tennessee	Jul 2, 1863	Voluntarily led a small party and, under a heavy fire, captured a stockade and saved the bridge.
—	Edward S. Martin	Navy	Quartermaster	(United States Navy) USS Galena	Aboard USS Galena, Battle of Mobile Bay	Aug 5, 1864	Securely lashed to the side of Oneida which had suffered the loss of her steering apparatus and an explosion of her boiler from enemy fire, Galena aided the stricken vessel past the enemy forts to safety. Despite heavy damage to his ship from raking enemy fire, Martin performed his duties with skill and courage throughout the action
—	George Martin	Army	Sergeant	(United States) Company B, 6th U.S. Cavalry Regiment	Millerstown, Pennsylvania	Jul 1863	Enlisted under the name Martin Schwenk, medal was issued under that name.
—	James Martin, II	Marine Corps	Sergeant	(United States Marine Corps) USS Richmond	Aboard USS Richmond, Battle of Mobile Bay	Aug 5, 1864	Despite damage to his ship and the loss of several men on board as enemy fire raked her decks, Sgt. Martin fought his gun with skill and courage throughout the furious two hour battle which resulted in the surrender of the rebel ram Tennessee and in the damaging and destruction of batteries at Fort Morgan.
Sylvester Hopkins Martin MoH winner	Sylvester H. Martin	Army	Second Lieutenant	Company K, 88th Pennsylvania Infantry	Battle of Globe Tavern, Virginia	Aug 19, 1864	Gallantly made a most dangerous reconnaissance, discovering the position of the enemy and enabling the division to repulse an attack made in strong force.
—	William Martin	Navy	Boatswain's Mate	(United States Navy) USS Benton	Aboard USS Benton, Yazoo River Expedition	December 27, 1862	Serving as boatswain's mate on board USS Benton during the attack on Hayne's Bluff, Yazoo River, 27 December 1862.
—	William Martin	Navy	Seaman	(United States Navy) USS Varuna	Aboard USS Varuna, Battle of Forts Jackson and St. Philip	April 24, 1862	Captain of a gun on board USS Varuna during an attack on Forts Jackson and St. Philip, 24 April 1862.
Head of a white man with a full beard and receding hairline, wearing a military jacket with large bright buttons.	Elihu H. Mason	Army	Sergeant	Company K, 21st Ohio Infantry	Great Locomotive Chase, Georgia	Apr 1862	Fourth person to receive Medal of Honor
William Henry Mathews MoH winner	William H. Mathews	Army	First Sergeant	Company E, 2nd Maryland Infantry Regiment	Battle of the Crater, Petersburg, Virginia	Jul 30, 1864	Enlisted under the name Henry Sivel, and original Medal of Honor issued under that name. A new medal was issued in 1900 under true name.
John Calvin Matthews, MoH, Company A, 61st Pennsylvania in 1891	John C. Matthews	Army	Corporal	Company A, 61st Pennsylvania Infantry	Third Battle of Petersburg, Virginia	Apr 2, 1865	Voluntarily took the colors, whose bearer had been disabled, and, although himself severely wounded, carried the same until the enemy's works were taken.
—	Milton Matthews	Army	Private	Company C, 61st Pennsylvania Infantry	Third Battle of Petersburg, Virginia	Apr 2, 1865	Capture of flag of 7th Tennessee Infantry (C.S.A.).
—	Henry B. Mattingly	Army	Private	Company B, 10th Regiment Kentucky Volunteer Infantry	Battle of Jonesborough, Georgia	Sep 1, 1864	Capture of flag of 6th and 7th Arkansas Infantry (C.S.A.).
Charles Porter Mattocks (October 11, 1840 – May 16, 1910) was a colonel in the Union Army who received the Medal of Honor.	Charles P. Mattocks	Army	Major	17th Maine Volunteer Infantry Regiment	Battle of Sayler's Creek, Virginia	Apr 6, 1865	Displayed extraordinary gallantry in leading a charge of his regiment which resulted in the capture of a large number of prisoners and a stand of colors.
Lowell Mason Maxham MoH winner	Lowell M. Maxham	Army	Corporal	Company F, 7th Massachusetts Volunteer Infantry	Second Battle of Fredericksburg, Virginia	May 3, 1863	Though severely wounded and in face of a deadly fire from the enemy at short range, he rushed bravely forward and was among the first to enter the enemy's works on the crest of Marye's Heights and helped to plant his regimental colors there.
—	William May	Army	Private	Company H, 32nd Iowa Volunteer Infantry Regiment	Battle of Nashville, Tennessee	Dec 16, 1864	Ran ahead of his regiment over the enemy's works and captured from its bearer the flag of Bouanchaud's Battery from Louisiana serving in the Confederate States Army.
—	John B. Mayberry	Army	Private	Company F, 1st Delaware Volunteer Infantry Regiment	Battle of Gettysburg, Pa.	Jul 3, 1863	Captured the enemy flag
—	William B. Mayes	Army	Private	Company K, 11th Iowa Volunteer Infantry Regiment	Near Kenesaw Mountain, Georgia	Jun 15, 1864	With one companion and under a fierce fire from the enemy at short range went to the rescue of a wounded comrade who had fallen between the lines and carried him to a place of safety.
MoH winner George H Maynard	George H. Maynard	Army	Private	Company D, 13th Massachusetts Volunteer Infantry Regiment	Battle of Fredericksburg, Virginia	Dec 13, 1862	A wounded and helpless comrade, having been left on the skirmish line, this soldier voluntarily returned to the front under a severe fire and carried the wounded man to a place of safety.
Peter McAdams MoH winner	Peter McAdams	Army	Corporal	Company A, 98th Pennsylvania Infantry	Salem Heights, Virginia	May 3, 1863	Went 250 yards in front of his regiment toward the position of the enemy and under fire brought within the lines a wounded and unconscious comrade.
—	Benjamin F. McAlwee	Army	Sergeant	, Company D, 3rd Regiment Maryland Volunteer Infantry	Battle of the Crater, Petersburg, Virginia	Jul 30, 1864	Picked up a shell with burning fuse and threw it over the parapet into the ditch, where it exploded; by this act he probably saved the lives of comrades at the great peril of his own.
Charles McAnally MoH winner	Charles McAnally	Army	Second Lieutenant	Company D, 69th Pennsylvania Infantry	Battle of Spotsylvania Court House, Virginia	May 12, 1864	In a hand-to-hand encounter with the enemy captured a flag, was wounded in the act, but continued on duty until he received a second wound.
William Wallace McCammon MoH winner	William W. McCammon	Army	First Lieutenant	24th Missouri Infantry	Second Battle of Corinth, Mississippi	Oct 3, 1862	While on duty as provost marshal, voluntarily assumed command of his company, then under fire, and so continued in command until the repulse and retreat of the enemy on the following day, the loss to this company during the battle being very great.
—	Bernard McCarren	Army	Private	Company C, 1st Regiment Delaware Volunteer Infantry	Battle of Gettysburg, Pennsylvania	Jul 3, 1863	Capture of flag.
—	Joseph McCauslln	Army	Private	Company D, 12th West Virginia Volunteer Infantry Regiment	Third Battle of Petersburg, Virginia	Apr 2, 1865	Conspicuous gallantry as color bearer in the assault on Fort Gregg.
Charles H McCleary MoH winner	Charles H. McCleary	Army	First Lieutenant	Company C, 72nd Ohio Volunteer Infantry	Battle of Nashville, Tennessee	Dec 16, 1864	Capture of flag of 4th Florida Infantry (C.S.A.), while in advance of his lines.
—	James M. McClelland	Army	Private	Company B, 30th Regiment Ohio Volunteer Infantry	Battle of Vicksburg, Mississippi	May 22, 1863	Gallantry in the charge of the "volunteer storming party."
—	Matthew McClelland	Navy	First Class Fireman	(United States Navy) USS Richmond	Aboard USS Richmond, Siege of Port Hudson	March 14, 1863	Serving on board USS Richmond in the attack on Port Hudson, 14 March 1863. Damaged by a 6-inch solid rifle shot which shattered the starboard safety-valve chamber and also damaged the port safety-valve, the fireroom of Richmond immediately became filled with steam to place it in an extremely critical condition. Acting courageously in this crisis, McClelland persisted in penetrating the steam-filled room in order to haul the hot fires of the furnaces and continued this gallant action until the gravity of the situation had lessened.
Samuel McConnell MoH winner	Samuel McConnell	Army	Captain	Company H, 119th Illinois Infantry Regiment	Battle of Fort Blakeley, Alabama	Apr 9, 1865	While leading his company in an assault, Capt. McConnell braved an intense fire that mowed down his unit. Upon reaching the breastworks he found that he had only one member of his company with him, Private Wagner. He was so close to an enemy gun that the blast knocked him down a ditch. Getting up, he entered the gun pit, the guncrew fleeing before him. About 30 paces away he saw a Confederate flag bearer and guard which he captured with the last shot in his pistol.
—	Michael McCormick	Navy	Boatswain's Mate	(United States Navy) USS Signal	Aboard USS Signal, Red River Campaign	May 5, 1864	Served as boatswain's mate on board USS Signal, Red River, 5 May 1864. Proceeding up the Red River, USS Signal engaged a large force of enemy field batteries and sharpshooters, returning the fire until the ship was totally disabled, at which time the white flag was raised. Serving as gun captain and wounded early in the battle, McCormick bravely stood by his gun in the face of the enemy fire until ordered to withdraw.
Andrew McCornack MoH winner	Andrew McCornack	Army	Private	Company I, 127th Regiment Illinois Volunteer Infantry	Battle of Vicksburg, Mississippi	May 22, 1863	Gallantry in the charge of the "volunteer storming party."
—	Adam McCullock	Navy	Seaman	(United States Navy) USS Lackawanna	Aboard USS Lackawanna, Battle of Mobile Bay	Aug 5, 1864	On board USS Lackawanna during successful attacks against Fort Morgan, rebel gunboats and the ram Tennessee in Mobile Bay, on 5 August 1864.
—	George E. McDonald	Army	Private	Company L, 1st Connecticut Heavy Artillery Regiment	Battle of Fort Stedman, Virginia	Mar 25, 1865	Capture of flag
—	John McDonald	Navy	Boatswain's Mate	(United States Navy) USS Baron DeKalb	Aboard USS Baron DeKalb, Yazoo River Expedition	December 23, 1862 – December 27, 1862	Serving on board USS Baron de Kalb, Yazoo River Expedition, 23 to 27 December 1862.
—	John W. McDonald	Army	Private	Company E, 20th Illinois Infantry Regiment	Battle of Shiloh, Tennessee	Apr 6, 1862	Was severely wounded while endeavoring, at the risk of his life, to carry to a place of safety a wounded and helpless comrade.
—	Samuel O. McElhlnny	Army	Private	Company A, 2nd West Virginia Volunteer Cavalry Regiment	Battle of Sayler's Creek, Virginia	Apr 6, 1865	Capture of flag.
—	Patrick H. McEnroe	Army	Sergeant	(New York (state)) Company D, 6th New York Cavalry Regiment	Battle of Opequon, Virginia	Sep 19, 1864	Capture of colors of 36th Virginia Infantry (C.S.A.).
—	Daniel McFall	Army	Sergeant	Company E, 17th Michigan Volunteer Infantry Regiment	Battle of Spotsylvania Court House, Virginia	May 12, 1864	Captured Colonel Barker, commanding the Confederate brigade that charged the Union batteries; on the same day rescued Lieutenant George W. Harmon of his regiment from the enemy.
—	John C. McFarland	Navy	Captain of the Forecastle	(United States Navy) USS Hartford	Aboard USS Hartford, Battle of Mobile Bay	Aug 5, 1864	For not leaving his post while under fire during successful action against Fort Morgan in Mobile Bay.
—	Edward McGinn	Army	Private	Company F, 54th Ohio Volunteer Infantry Regiment	Battle of Vicksburg, Mississippi	May 22, 1863	Gallantry in the charge of the "volunteer storming party."
—	Wilson McGonagle	Army	Private	Company B, 30th Regiment Ohio Volunteer Infantry	Battle of Vicksburg, Mississippi	May 22, 1863	Gallantry in the charge of the "volunteer storming party."
—	Andrew J. McGonnigle	Army	Captain and Assistant Quartermaster	(United States) Quartermaster Corps Army of the Shenandoah (Union)	Battle of Cedar Creek, Virginia	Oct 19, 1864	While acting chief quartermaster of General Sheridan's forces operating in the Shenandoah Valley was severely wounded while voluntarily leading a brigade of infantry and was commended for the greatest gallantry by General Sheridan.
—	Owen McGough	Army	Corporal	(United States) Battery D, 5th U.S. Artillery	First Battle of Bull Run, Virginia	Jul 21, 1861	Through his personal exertions under a heavy fire, one of the guns of his battery was brought off the field; all the other guns were lost.
—	John McGowan	Navy	Quartermaster	(United States Navy) USS Varuna	Aboard USS Varuna, Battle of Forts Jackson and St. Philip	April 24, 1862	McGowan occupied one of the most responsible positions on USS Varuna during the attacks on Forts Jackson and St. Philip and in action against the rebel ship Morgan on 24 April 1862.
—	Thomas McGraw	Army	Sergeant	Company B, 23rd Illinois Volunteer Infantry Regiment	Third Battle of Petersburg, Virginia	Apr 2, 1865	One of the three soldiers most conspicuous for gallantry in the final assault.
—	Patrick McGuire	Army	Private	(Illinois) Chicago Mercantile Independent Battery Light Artillery	Battle of Vicksburg, Mississippi	May 22, 1863	Carried with others by hand a cannon up to and fired it through an embrasure of the enemy's work.
—	Alexander U. McHale	Army	Corporal	Company H, 26th Michigan Volunteer Infantry Regiment	Battle of Spotsylvania Court House, Virginia	May 12, 1864	Captured a Confederate color in a charge, threw the flag over in front of the works, and continued in the charge upon the enemy.
—	Martin McHugh	Navy	Seaman	(United States Navy) USS Cincinnati	Aboard USS Cincinnati, Operations against Vicksburg	May 27, 1863	Serving on board USS Cincinnati during the attack on the Vicksburg batteries and at the time of her sinking, 27 May 1863.
—	James McIntosh	Navy	Captain of the Top	(United States Navy) USS Richmond	Aboard USS Richmond, Battle of Mobile Bay	Aug 5, 1864	On board USS Richmond during action against rebel forts and gunboats and with the ram Tennessee in Mobile Bay, 5 August 1864.
Charles W McKay MoH winner	Charles W. McKay	Army	Sergeant	(New York (state)) Company C, 154th New York Volunteer Infantry	Battle of Rocky Face Ridge, Dug Gap, Georgia	May 8, 1864	Voluntarily risked his life in rescuing under the fire of the enemy a wounded comrade who was lying between the lines.
—	George McKee	Army	Color Sergeant	(New York (state)) Company D, 89th New York Infantry	Third Battle of Petersburg, Virginia	Apr 2, 1865	Gallantry as color bearer in the assault on Fort Gregg
	Nineveh S. McKeen	Army	First Lieutenant	Company H, 21st Illinois Infantry Regiment	Stone River, Tennessee and Battle of Hoover's Gap, Liberty Gap, Tennessee	Dec 30, 1862 and Jun 25, 1863	Conspicuous in the charge at Stone River, Tennessee, where he was three times wounded. At Liberty Gap, Tennessee, captured colors of 8th Arkansas Infantry (C.S.A.).
Michael McKeever MoH winner	Michael McKeever	Army	Private	Company K, 5th Pennsylvania Cavalry Regiment	Burnt Ordinary, Virginia	Jan 19, 1863	Was one of a small scouting party that charged and routed a mounted force of the enemy six times their number. He led the charge in a most gallant and distinguished manner, going far beyond the call of duty.
Framed portrait of a white man with an extremely bushy mustache, wearing a dark suit coat and bow tie.	William McKnight	Navy	Coxswain	(United States Navy) USS Varuna	Aboard USS Varuna, Battle of Forts Jackson and St. Philip	April 24, 1862	Captain of a gun on board USS USS Varuna during the attacks on Forts Jackson and St. Philip and in action against the rebel ship Morgan, 24 April 1862.
Nathaniel A McKown MoH winner	Nathaniel A. McKown	Army	Sergeant	Company B, 58th Pennsylvania Infantry Regiment	Battle of Chaffin's Farm, Virginia	Sep 29, 1864	Capture of flag.
—	James McLeod	Navy	Captain of the Foretop	(United States Navy)	Aboard USS Pensacola, Battle of Forts Jackson and St. Philip	April 24, 1862 – April 25, 1862	Captain of foretop, and a volunteer from the Colorado, McLeod served on board USS Pensacola during the attack upon Forts Jackson and St. Philip and the taking of New Orleans, 24 and 25 April 1862. Acting as gun captain of the rifled howitzer aft which was much exposed, he served this piece with great ability and activity, although no officer superintended it.
	Martin T. McMahon	Army	Captain	(United States) U.S. Volunteers Army of the Potomac	Battle of White Oak Swamp, Virginia	Jun 30, 1862	Under fire of the enemy, successfully destroyed a valuable train that had been abandoned and prevented it from falling into the hands of the enemy.
Francis M McMillen MoH winner	Francis M. McMillen	Army	Sergeant	Company C, 110th Ohio Infantry	Third Battle of Petersburg, Virginia	Apr 2, 1865	Capture of flag.
—	John P. McVeane*	Army	Corporal	(New York (state)) Company D, 49th New York Infantry	Fredericksburg Heights, Virginia	May 4, 1863	Shot a Confederate color bearer and seized the flag; also approached, alone, a barn between the lines and demanded and received the surrender of a number of the enemy therein.
—	Walter F. McWhorter	Army	Commissary Sergeant	Company E, 3rd West Virginia Cavalry	Battle of Sayler's Creek, Virginia	Apr 6, 1865	Capture of flag of 6th Tennessee Infantry (C.S.A.)
—	George W. McWilliams	Navy	Landsman	(United States Navy) USS Pontoosuc	Aboard USS Pontoosuc, First and Second Battles of Fort Fisher	Dec 24, 1864 – Feb 22, 1865	Served on board USS Pontoosuc during the capture of Fort Fisher and Wilmington, 24 December 1864, to 22 February 1865.
—	George E. Meach	Army	Farrier	(New York (state)) Company I, 6th New York Cavalry Regiment	Battle of Opequon, Virginia	Sep 19, 1864	Capture of flag
—	Thomas Meagher	Army	First Sergeant	(New York (state)) Company G, 158th New York Volunteer Infantry Regiment	Battle of Chaffin's Farm, Virginia	Sep 29, 1864	Led a section of his men on the enemy's works, receiving a wound while scaling a parapet.
George Washington Mears MoH winner	George W. Mears	Army	Sergeant	Company A, 6th Pennsylvania Reserve Regiment	Battle of Gettysburg, Pennsylvania	Jul 2, 1863	With five volunteers he gallantly charged on a number of the enemy's sharpshooters concealed in a log house, captured them, and brought them into the Union lines.
—	Charles Melville	Navy	Ordinary Seaman	(United States Navy) USS Hartford	Aboard USS Hartford, Battle of Mobile Bay	Aug 5, 1864	On board the flagship USS Hartford during action against rebel gunboats, the ram Tennessee, and Fort Morgan in Mobile Bay, 5 August 1864.
—	John W. Menter	Army	Sergeant	Company D, 5th Michigan Volunteer Infantry Regiment	Battle of Sayler's Creek, Virginia	Apr 6, 1865	Capture of flag.
A white man with mustache, wearing an ornate military uniform including a sash across the chest, fringed shoulder boards, white gloves, and several medals pinned to the left breast.	Henry C. Merriam	Army	Lieutenant Colonel	(United States) 73rd Regiment Infantry U.S. Colored Troops	Battle of Fort Blakeley, Alabama	Apr 9, 1865	Volunteered to attack the enemy's works in advance of orders and, upon permission being given, made a most gallant assault.
—	James K. Merrifield	Army	Corporal	Company C, 88th Illinois Infantry Regiment	Second Battle of Franklin, Tennessee	Nov 30, 1864	Captured two battle flags from the enemy and returned with them to his own lines.
George Merrill MoH winner	Augustus Merrill	Army	Captain	Company B, 1st Maine Veteran Volunteer Infantry	Third Battle of Petersburg, Virginia	Apr 2, 1865	With 6 men, captured 69 Confederate prisoners and recaptured several soldiers who had fallen into the enemy's hands.
—	George Merrill	Army	Private	(New York (state)) Company I, 142nd New York Volunteer Infantry	Second Battle of Fort Fisher, North Carolina	Jan 15, 1865	Voluntarily advanced with the head of the column and cut down the palisading.
John G Merritt MoH winner	John G. Merritt	Army	Sergeant	Company K, 1st Minnesota Volunteer Infantry Regiment	First Battle of Bull Run, Virginia	Jul 21, 1861	Gallantry in action; was wounded while capturing flag in advance of his regiment.
—	Henry Coddington Meyer	Army	Captain	(New York (state)) Company D, 24th New York Cavalry Regiment	Second Battle of Petersburg, Virginia	Jun 17, 1864	During an assault and in the face of a heavy fire rendered heroic assistance to a wounded and helpless officer, thereby saving his life and in the performance of this gallant act sustained a severe wound. Buried in Rosedale Cemetery.
A U.S. Navy poster featuring Mifflin	James Mifflin	Navy	Engineer's Cook	(United States Navy) USS Brooklyn	Aboard USS Brooklyn, Battle of Mobile Bay	Aug 5, 1864	On board USS Brooklyn during successful attacks against Fort Morgan, rebel gunboats and the ram Tennessee in Mobile Bay, on 5 August 1864.
Head and shoulders of a young white man with wavy hair and a mustache, wearing a double-breasted military jacket with a rectangular patch over each shoulder.	Nelson A. Miles	Army	Colonel	(New York (state)) 61st New York Volunteer Infantry Regiment	Battle of Chancellorsville, Virginia	May 2, 1863 – May 3, 1863	Holding with his command an advanced position against repeated assaults by the enemy.
—	Andrew Miller	Marine Corps	Sergeant	(United States Marine Corps) USS Richmond	Aboard USS Richmond, Battle of Mobile Bay	Aug 5, 1864	Served board USS Richmond during Battle of Fort Morgan.
—	Frank Miller	Army	Private	(New York (state)) Company M, 2nd New York Cavalry Regiment	Battle of Sayler's Creek, Virginia	Apr 6, 1865	Capture of flag of 25th Battalion Virginia Infantry (C.S.A.); was taken prisoner, but successfully retained his trophy until recaptured.
—	Henry A. Miller	Army	Captain	Company B, 8th Illinois Volunteer Infantry Regiment	Battle of Fort Blakeley, Alabama	Apr 9, 1865	Capture of flag
Jacob C Miller MoH winner	Jacob C. Miller	Army	Private	Company G, 113th Illinois Volunteer Infantry	Battle of Vicksburg, Mississippi	May 22, 1863	Gallantry in the charge of the "volunteer storming party."
Framed portrait of a white man with a drooping mustache wearing a dark suit coat and bow tie.	James Miller	Navy	Quartermaster	(United States Navy) USS Marblehead	Aboard USS Marblehead	December 25, 1863	Served as quartermaster on board the U.S. steam gunboat USS Marblehead off Legareville, Stono River, 25 December 1863, during an engagement with the enemy on John's Island. Acting courageously under the fierce hostile fire, Miller behaved gallantly throughout the engagement which resulted in the enemy's withdrawal and abandonment of its arms.
James P Miller MoH winner	James P. Miller	Army	Private	Company D, 4th Iowa Cavalry	Selma, Alabama	April 2, 1865	Capture of standard of 12th Mississippi Cavalry (C.S.A.).
—	John Miller	Army	Corporal	Company G, 8th Ohio Infantry	Battle of Gettysburg, Pennsylvania	Jul 3, 1863	for capture of 2 flags
—	John Miller	Army	Private	(New York (state)) Company H, 8th New York Volunteer Cavalry Regiment	Battle of Waynesboro, Virginia	Mar 2, 1865	for capture of flag
William Edward Miller MoH winner	William E. Miller	Army	Captain	Company H, 3rd Pennsylvania Cavalry	Battle of Gettysburg, Pennsylvania	Jul 3, 1863	Without orders, led a charge of his squadron upon the flank of the enemy, checked his attack, and cut off and dispersed the rear of his column.
—	Daniel Milliken	Navy	Quarter Gunner	(United States Navy) USS New Ironsides	Aboard USS New Ironsides, First and Second Battles of Fort Fisher	Dec 1864 – Jan 1865	Milliken served on board USS New Ironsides during action in several attacks on Fort Fisher, 24 and 25 December 1864 and 13, 14 and 15 January 1865.
—	Charles Mills	Navy	Seaman	(United States Navy) USS Minnesota	Aboard USS Minnesota, Second Battle of Fort Fisher	Jan 15, 1865	On board USS Minnesota, in action during the assault on Fort Fisher, 15 January 1865.
Frank W Mills MoH winner	Frank W. Mills	Army	Corporal	(New York (state)) Company C, 1st New York Mounted Rifles Regiment	Sandy Cross Roads, North Carolina	Sep 4, 1862	While scouting, this soldier, in command of an advance of but 3 or 4 men, came upon the enemy, and charged them without orders, the rest of the troops following, the whole force of the enemy, 120 men, being captured.
George Washington Mindil MoH winner	George W. Mindil	Army	Captain	Company I, 61st Pennsylvania Infantry	Battle of Williamsburg, Virginia	May 5, 1862	As aide de camp led the charge with a part of a regiment, pierced the enemy's center, silenced some of his artillery, and, getting in his rear, caused him to abandon his position.
—	Alexander H. Mitchell	Army	First Lieutenant	Company A, 105th Pennsylvania Infantry	Battle of Spotsylvania Court House, Virginia	May 12, 1864	Capture of flag of 18th North Carolina Infantry (C.S.A.), in a personal encounter with the color bearer.
—	Theodore Mitchell	Army	Private	Company C, 61st Pennsylvania Infantry Regiment	Third Battle of Petersburg, Virginia	Apr 2, 1865	Capture of the flag of the Tennessee Brigade (C.S.A.).
	John H. Moffitt	Army	Corporal	(New York (state)) Company C, 16th New York Volunteer Infantry Regiment	Battle of Gaines' Mill, Virginia	Jun 27, 1862	Voluntarily took up the regimental colors after several color bearers had been shot down and carried them until himself wounded.
—	Archibald Molbone	Army	Sergeant	Battery G, 1st Rhode Island Volunteer Light Artillery	Third Battle of Petersburg, Virginia	Apr 2, 1865	Was one of a detachment of 20 picked artillerymen who voluntarily accompanied an infantry assaulting party and who turned upon the enemy the guns captured in the assault.
Framed portrait of a white man with a very long beard, neatly trimmed hair, and a dark jacket.	Hugh Molloy	Navy	Ordinary Seaman	(United States Navy) USS Fort Hindman	Aboard USS Fort Hindman	March 2, 1864	Served on board USS Fort Hindman during the engagement near Harrisonburg, Louisiana, 2 March 1864.
Patrick H Monaghan MoH winner	Patrick Monaghan	Army	Corporal	Company F, 48th Pennsylvania Infantry Regiment	Second Battle of Petersburg, Virginia	Jun 17, 1864	Recapture of colors of 7th New York Heavy Artillery.
—	Robert Montgomery	Navy	Captain of the Afterguard	(United States Navy) USS Agawam	Aboard USS Agawam, First Battle of Fort Fisher	December 23, 1864	Montgomery served on board USS Agawam, as one of a volunteer crew of a powder boat which was exploded near Fort Fisher, 23 December 1864.
—	Charles Moore	Navy	Landsman	(United States Navy) USS Marblehead	Aboard USS Marblehead	Dec 25, 1863	Serving on board the U.S. steam gunboat USS Marblehead off Legareville, Stono River, 25 December 1863, during an engagement with the enemy on John's Island.
—	Charles Moore	Navy	Seaman	(United States Navy) USS Kearsarge	Aboard USS Kearsarge off Cherbourg, France	Jun 19, 1864	Served as seaman on board USS Kearsarge when she destroyed the raider Alabama off Cherbourg, France, 19 June 1864.
—	Daniel B. Moore	Army	Corporal	Company E, 11th Wisconsin Volunteer Infantry Regiment	Battle of Fort Blakeley, Alabama	Apr 9, 1865	At the risk of his own life saved the life of an officer who had been shot down and overpowered by superior numbers.
—	George Moore	Navy	Seaman	(United States Navy) USS Rhode Island	Aboard USS Rhode Island, loss of USS Monitor	December 30, 1862	Served on board USS Rhode Island which was engaged in saving the lives of the officers and crew of USS Monitor, 30 December 1862.
—	George G. Moore	Army	Private	Company D, 11th West Virginia Volunteer Infantry Regiment	Battle of Fisher's Hill, Virginia	Sep 22, 1864	Capture of flag
—	Wilbur F. Moore	Army	Private	Company C, 117th Illinois Infantry Regiment	Battle of Nashville, Tennessee	Dec 16, 1864	Captured flag of a Confederate battery while far in advance of the Union lines.
—	William Moore	Navy	Boatswain's Mate	(United States Navy) USS Benton	Aboard USS Benton	December 27, 1862	Serving as boatswain's mate on board USS Benton during the attack on Hayne's Bluff, Yazoo River, 27 December 1862.
Delano Morey MoH winner	Delano Morey	Army	Private	Company B, 82nd Ohio Infantry	Battle of McDowell, Virginia	May 8, 1862	After the charge of the command had been repulsed, he rushed forward alone with an empty gun and captured two of the enemy's sharpshooters.
—	Jerome Morford	Army	Private	Company K, 55th Illinois Volunteer Infantry Regiment	Battle of Vicksburg, Mississippi	May 22, 1863	Gallantry in the charge of the "volunteer storming party."
—	James H. Morgan	Navy	Captain of the Top	(United States Navy) USS Richmond	Aboard USS Richmond, Battle of Mobile Bay	Aug 5, 1864	As captain of a gun on board USS Richmond during action against rebel forts and gunboats and with the ram Tennessee in Mobile Bay, 5 August 1864.
—	Lewis Morgan	Army	Private	Company I, 4th Ohio Infantry	Battle of Spotsylvania Court House, Virginia	May 12, 1864	Capture of flag from the enemy's works.
Richard H Morgan MoH winner	Richard H. Morgan	Army	Corporal	Company A, 4th Iowa Cavalry	Columbus, Georgia	Apr 16, 1865	Capture of flag inside the enemy's works, contesting for its possession with its bearer.
	Walter Goodale Morrill	Army	Captain	Company B, 20th Maine Volunteer Infantry Regiment	Second Battle of Rappahannock Station, Virginia	Nov 7, 1863	Learning that an assault was to be made upon the enemy's works by other troops, this officer voluntarily joined the storming party with about 50 men of his regiment, and by his dash and gallantry rendered effective service in the assault.
William Powers Morris MoH winner	William Morris	Army	Sergeant	(New York (state)) Company C, 1st New York Volunteer Cavalry	Battle of Sayler's Creek, Virginia	Apr 6, 1865	Capture of flag of 40th Virginia Infantry (C.S.A.).
MoH winner Francis Morrison	Francis Morrison	Army	Private	Company H, 85th Pennsylvania Infantry	Bermuda Hundred Campaign, Virginia	Jun 17, 1864	Voluntarily exposed himself to a heavy fire to bring off a wounded comrade.
MoH winner John George Morrison	John G. Morrison	Navy	Coxswain	(United States Navy) USS Carondelet	Aboard USS Carondelet	July 15, 1862	Serving as coxswain on board USS Carondelet, Morrison was commended for meritorious conduct in general and especially for his heroic conduct and his inspiring example to the crew in the engagement with the rebel ram Arkansas, Yazoo River, 15 July 1862.
Benjamin Morse MoH winner	Benjamin Morse	Army	Private	Company C, 3rd Michigan Volunteer Infantry Regiment	Battle of Spotsylvania Court House, Virginia	May 12, 1864	Capture of colors of 4th Georgia Battery (C.S.A.)
MoH winner Charles E Morse	Charles E. Morse	Army	Sergeant	(New York (state)) Company I, 62nd New York Volunteer Infantry Regiment	Battle of the Wilderness, Virginia	May 5, 1864	Voluntarily rushed back into the enemy's lines, took the colors from the color sergeant, who was mortally wounded, and, although himself wounded, carried them through the fight.
—	Charles W. Morton	Navy	Boatswain's Mate	(United States Navy) USS Benton	Aboard USS Benton, Yazoo River Expedition	December 23, 1862 – December 27, 1862	For extraordinary heroism onboard USS Benton during the expedition.
—	John W. Mostoller	Army	Private	Company B, 54th Pennsylvania Infantry Regiment	Battle of Lynchburg, Virginia	Jun 18, 1864	Voluntarily led a charge on a Confederate battery (the officers of the company being disabled) and compelled its hasty removal.
Portrait of a white man with wavy hair and a long, forked beard, wearing a suit.	St. Clair A. Mulholland	Army	Major	116th Pennsylvania Infantry Regiment	Battle of Chancellorsville, Virginia	May 4, 1863 – May 5, 1863	In command of the picket line held the enemy in check all night to cover the retreat of the Army.
—	Patrick Mullen	Navy	Boatswain's Mate	(United States Navy) USS Wyandank	Aboard USS Wyandank, Mattox Creek	Mar 17, 1865	Served as boatswain's mate on board USS Wyandank during a boat expedition up Mattox Creek, 17 March 1865.
—	Patrick Mullen	Navy	Boatswain's Mate	(United States Navy) USS Don	Aboard USS Don	May 1, 1865	For extraordinary heroism onboard USS Don where he saved an officer from drowning
—	Walter L. Mundell	Army	Corporal	Company E, 5th Michigan Volunteer Infantry Regiment	Battle of Sayler's Creek, Virginia	Apr 6, 1865	Capture of flag.
MoH winner Harvey May Munsell	Harvey M. Munsell	Army	Sergeant	Company A, 99th Pennsylvania Infantry Regiment	Battle of Gettysburg, Pennsylvania	Jul 1, 1863 – Jul 3, 1863	Gallant and courageous conduct as color bearer. (This noncommissioned officer carried the colors of his regiment through 13 engagements.)
	Charles J. Murphy	Army	First Lieutenant and Quartermaster	(New York (state)) 38th New York Volunteer Infantry Regiment "Second Scott's Life Guard"	First Battle of Bull Run, Virginia	Jul 21, 1861	Took a rifle and voluntarily fought with his regiment in the ranks; when the regiment was forced back, voluntarily remained on the field caring for the wounded, and was there taken prisoner.
—	Daniel J. Murphy	Army	Sergeant	Company F, 19th Massachusetts Volunteer Infantry Regiment	Hatchers Run, Virginia	Oct 27, 1864	Capture of flag of 47th North Carolina Infantry (C.S.A.).
—	Denis J. F. Murphy	Army	Sergeant	Company F, 14th Wisconsin Volunteer Infantry	Second Battle of Corinth, Mississippi	Oct 3, 1862	Although wounded three times, carried the colors throughout the conflict.
—	James T. Murphy	Army	Private	Company L, 1st Connecticut Heavy Artillery Regiment	Battle of Fort Stedman, Petersburg, Virginia	Mar 25, 1865	A piece of artillery having been silenced by the enemy, this soldier voluntarily assisted in working the piece, conducting himself throughout the engagement in a gallant and fearless manner.
—	John P. Murphy	Army	Private	Company K, 5th Ohio Volunteer Infantry Regiment	Battle of Antietam, Maryland	Sep 17, 1862	Capture of flag of 13th Alabama Infantry (C.S.A.).
Portrait of a Michael Murphy from his March 4, 1903 obituary	Michael C. Murphy	Army	Lieutenant Colonel	(New York (state)) 170th New York Volunteer Infantry	Battle of North Anna, Virginia	May 24, 1864	This officer, commanding the regiment, kept it on the field exposed to the fire of the enemy for 3 hours without being able to fire one shot in return because of the ammunition being exhausted.
Patrick Murphy MoH winner	Patrick Murphy	Navy	Boatswain's Mate	(United States Navy) USS Metacomet	Aboard USS Metacomet, Battle of Mobile Bay	Aug 5, 1864	Served as boatswain's mate on board USS Metacomet, during action against rebel forts and gunboats and with the ram Tennessee in Mobile Bay, 5 August 1864.
—	Robinson B. Murphy	Army	Musician	Company A, 127th Illinois Infantry Regiment	Battle of Ezra Church, Atlanta, Georgia	Jul 28, 1864	Being orderly to the brigade commander, he voluntarily led two regiments as reinforcements into line of battle, where he had his horse shot under him.
—	Thomas Murphy	Army	Corporal	(New York (state)) Company K, 158th New York Volunteer Infantry	Battle of Chaffin's Farm, Virginia	Sep 30, 1864	Capture of flag
—	Thomas C. Murphy	Army	Corporal	Company I, 31st Illinois Infantry Regiment	Battle of Vicksburg, Mississippi	May 22, 1863	Voluntarily crossed the line of heavy fire of Union and Confederate forces, carrying a message to stop the firing of one Union regiment on another.
—	Thomas J. Murphy	Army	First Sergeant	(New York (state)) Company G, 146th New York Volunteer Infantry Regiment	Battle of Five Forks, Virginia	Apr 1, 1865	Capture of flag
George S Myers MoH winner	George S. Myers	Army	Private	Company F, 101st Ohio Infantry	Battle of Chickamauga, Georgia	Sep 19, 1863	Saved the regimental colors by greatest personal devotion and bravery.
—	William H. Myers	Army	Private	Company A, 1st Maryland Cavalry	Battle of Appomattox Courthouse, Virginia	Apr 9, 1865	Gallantry in action; was 5 times wounded.

== N ==
Recipients are listed alphabetically by last name. Posthumous receipt is denoted by an asterisk.

This along with the *, indicates that the Medal of Honor was awarded posthumously

Image	Name	Service	Rank	Unit/Command	Place of action	Date of action	Notes
—	Henry H. Nash	Army	Corporal	Company B, 47th Ohio Infantry	Battle of Vicksburg, Mississippi	May 3, 1863	Was one of a party that volunteered and attempted to run the enemy's batteries with a steam tug and two barges loaded with subsistence stores.
—	David Naylor	Navy	Landsman	(United States Navy) USS Oneida	Aboard USS Oneida, Battle of Mobile Bay	Aug 5, 1864	For his actions while on board USS Oneida in the engagement at Mobile Bay, 5 August 1864
MoH winner Zachariah C Neahr	Zachariah C. Neahr	Army	Private	(New York (state)) Company K, 142nd New York Volunteer Infantry	Second Battle of Fort Fisher, North Carolina	Jan 15, 1865	Voluntarily advanced with the head of the column and cut down the palisading.
—	John Neil	Navy	Quarter Gunner	(United States Navy) USS Agawam	Aboard USS Agawam, First Battle of Fort Fisher	December 23, 1864	For his actions while serving on board USS Agawam, as one of a volunteer crew of a powder boat which was exploded near Fort Fisher, 23 December 1864
—	Edwin M. Neville	Army	Captain	Company C, 1st Connecticut Cavalry	Battle of Sayler's Creek, Virginia	Apr 6, 1865	Capture of the enemy flag
Head and shoulders of a man with a wide, bushy mustache wearing a dark suit coat with a pocket square. The portrait is surrounded by a circular frame and a depiction of ships at sea and an American flag.	William D. Newland	Navy	Ordinary Seaman	(United States Navy) USS Oneida	Aboard USS Oneida, Battle of Mobile Bay	Aug 5, 1864	Newland distinguished himself on board USS Oneida for his good conduct and faithful discharge of his station, behaving splendidly under the fire of the enemy and throughout the battle which resulted in the capture of the rebel ram Tennessee and the damaging of Fort Morgan.
MoH winner Marcellus J Newman	Marcellus J. Newman	Army	Private	Company B, 111th Illinois Infantry	Battle of Resaca, Georgia	May 14, 1864	Voluntarily returned, in the face of a severe fire from the enemy, and rescued a wounded comrade who had been left behind as the regiment fell back.
—	William H. Newman	Army	Second Lieutenant	(New York (state)) Company B, 86th New York Infantry	Near Amelia Springs, Virginia	Apr 6, 1865	Capture of the enemy flag
MoH winner John H Nibbe	John H. Nibbe	Navy	Quartermaster	(United States Navy) USS Petrel	Aboard USS Petrel	April 22, 1864	Served as quartermaster on board USS Petrel during its capture in Yazoo River, 22 April 1864.
MoH winner Henry Clay Nichols	Henry C. Nichols	Army	Captain	(United States) 73rd Regiment Infantry U.S. Colored Troops	Battle of Fort Blakeley, Alabama	Apr 9, 1865	Voluntarily made a reconnaissance in advance of the line held by his regiment and, under a heavy fire, obtained information of great value.
—	William Nichols	Navy	Quartermaster	(United States Navy) USS Brooklyn	Aboard USS Brooklyn, Battle of Mobile Bay	Aug 5, 1864	On board USS Brooklyn during successful attacks against Fort Morgan, rebel gunboats and the ram Tennessee, in Mobile Bay, on 5 August 1864.
MoH winner Robert Niven	Robert Niven	Army	Second Lieutenant	(New York (state)) Company H, 8th New York Volunteer Cavalry Regiment	Battle of Waynesboro, Virginia	Mar 2, 1865	Capture of two flags
—	Daniel Noble	Navy	Landsman	(United States Navy) USS Metacomet	Aboard USS Metacomet, Battle of Mobile Bay	Aug 5, 1864	As landsman on board USS Metacomet, Noble served among the boat's crew which went to the rescue of the U.S. monitor USS Tecumseh when that vessel was struck by a torpedo in passing enemy forts in Mobile Bay, 5 August 1864.
MoH winner John J Nolan	John J. Nolan	Army	Sergeant	Company K, 8th New Hampshire Volunteer Infantry Regiment	Georgia Landing, Louisiana	Oct 27, 1862	Although prostrated by a cannon shot, refused to give up the flag which he was carrying as color bearer of his regiment and continued to carry it at the head of the regiment throughout the engagement.
MoH winner Conrad Noll	Conrad Noll	Army	Sergeant	Company D, 20th Michigan Volunteer Infantry Regiment	Battle of Spotsylvania Court House, Virginia	May 12, 1864	Seized the colors, the color bearer having been shot down, and gallantly fought his way out with them, though the enemy were on the left flank and rear.
—	Jasper N. North	Army	Private	Company D, 4th West Virginia Volunteer Infantry Regiment	Battle of Vicksburg, Mississippi	May 22, 1863	Gallantry in the charge of the "volunteer storming party."
MoH winner Elliot Malloy Norton	Elliott M. Norton	Army	Second Lieutenant	Company H, 6th Michigan Cavalry	Battle of Sayler's Creek, Virginia	Apr 6, 1865	Rushed ahead of his column and captured the flag of the 44th Tennessee Infantry (C.S.A.).
—	John R. Norton	Army	Second Lieutenant	(New York (state)) Company M, 1st New York ("Lincoln Cavalry") Cavalry	Battle of Sayler's Creek, Virginia	Apr 6, 1865	Capture of the enemy flag
MoH winner Llewellyn Powell Norton	Llewellyn P. Norton	Army	Sergeant	(New York (state)) Company L, 10th New York Volunteer Cavalry ("Porter Guard")	Battle of Sayler's Creek, Virginia	Apr 6, 1865	Charged the enemy and, with the assistance of Corporal Bringle, captured a fieldpiece with two prisoners.
MoH winner William Wallace Noyes	William W. Noyes	Army	Private	Company F, 2nd Vermont Volunteer Infantry Regiment	Battle of Spotsylvania Court House, Virginia	May 12, 1864	Standing upon the top of the breastworks, deliberately took aim and fired no less than 15 shots into the enemy's lines, but a few yards away.
—	Christopher Nugent	Marine Corps	Orderly Sergeant	(United States Marine Corps) USS Fort Henry	Aboard USS Fort Henry	June 15, 1863	For his actions while serving on board USS Fort Henry, Crystal River, Florida, 15 June 1863.
MoH winner Lee Nutting	Lee Nutting	Army	Captain	(New York (state)) Company C, 61st New York Volunteer Infantry Regiment	Todd's Tavern, Virginia	May 8, 1864	Led the regiment in charge at a critical moment under a murderous fire until he fell desperately wounded.

== O ==
Recipients are listed alphabetically by last name. Posthumous receipt is denoted by an asterisk.

This along with the *, indicates that the Medal of Honor was awarded posthumously

Image	Name	Service	Rank	Unit/Command	Place of action	Date of action	Notes
Medal of Honor winner James Rowan O'Beirne	James R. O'Beirne	Army	Captain	(New York (state)) Company C, 37th New York Volunteer Infantry (Irish Rifles)	Battle of Seven Pines, Virginia	May 31, 1862 – Jun 1, 1862	Gallantly maintained the line of battle until ordered to fall back.
Medal of Honor winner Henry D O'Brien	Henry D. O'Brien	Army	Corporal	Company E, 1st Minnesota Volunteer Infantry Regiment	Battle of Gettysburg, Pennsylvania	Jul 3, 1863	Taking up the colors where they had fallen, he rushed ahead of his regiment, close to the muzzles of the enemy's guns, and engaged in the desperate struggle in which the enemy was defeated, and though severely wounded, he held the colors until wounded a second time.
—	Oliver O'Brien	Navy	Coxswain	(United States Navy) USS John Adams	Aboard USS John Adams	November 28, 1864	Served as coxswain on board the U.S. sloop John Adams, Sullivan's Island Channel, 28 November 1864. Taking part in the boarding of the blockade runner SS Beatrice (UK registry) while under heavy enemy fire from Fort Moultrie, O'Brien, who was in charge of one of the boarding launches, carried out his duties with prompt and energetic conduct. This action resulted in the firing of Beatrice and the capture of a quantity of supplies from her.
—	Peter O'Brien	Army	Private	(New York (state)) Company A, 1st New York Volunteer Cavalry "Lincoln Cavalry"	Battle of Waynesboro, Virginia	Mar 2, 1865	Capture of flag and of a Confederate officer with his horse and equipment
—	Thomas O'Connell	Navy	Coal Heaver	(United States Navy) USS Hartford	Aboard USS Hartford, Battle of Mobile Bay	Aug 5, 1864	On board the flagship USS Hartford, during successful attacks against Fort Morgan, rebel gunboats and the ram Tennessee in Mobile Bay on 5 August 1864.
Medal of Honor winner Albert O'Connor	Albert O'Connor	Army	Sergeant	Company A, 7th Wisconsin Volunteer Infantry Regiment	Gravelly Run, Virginia	Mar 31, 1865 – Apr 1, 1865	On 31 March 1865, with a comrade, recaptured a Union officer from a detachment of 9 Confederates, capturing 3 of the detachment and dispersing the remainder, and on 1 April 1865, seized a stand of Confederate colors, killing a Confederate officer in a hand-to-hand contest over the colors and retaining the colors until surrounded by Confederates and compelled to relinquish them.
—	Timothy O'Connor	Army	Private	(United States) Company E, 1st U.S. Cavalry Regiment	Malvern, Virginia	Jul 28, 1864	Private O'Connor captured the flag of the Confederate 18th North Carolina Infantry. For extreme bravery, he was awarded the Medal of Honor on January 5, 1865 and later achieved the rank of Sergeant.
Medal of Honor winner John O'Dea	John O'Dea	Army	Private	Company D, 8th Missouri Volunteer Infantry	Battle of Vicksburg, Mississippi	May 22, 1863	Gallantry in the charge of the "volunteer storming party
Medal of Honor winner Menomen O'Donnell	Menomen O'Donnell	Army	First Lieutenant	Company A, 11th Missouri Volunteer Infantry	Battle of Vicksburg, Mississippi and Fort DeRussey, Louisiana	May 22, 1863 and Mar 14, 1864	Voluntarily joined the color guard in the assault on the enemy's works when he saw indications of wavering and caused the colors of his regiment to be planted on the parapet. Voluntarily placed himself in the ranks of an assaulting column (being then on staff duty) and rode with it into the enemy's works, being the only mounted officer present, was twice wounded in battle.
—	Timothy O'Donoghue	Navy	Seaman	(United States Navy) USS Signal	Aboard USS Signal, Red River Campaign	May 5, 1864	Served as boatswain's mate on board USS Signal, Red River, 5 May 1864.
—	Charles Oliver	Army	Sergeant	Company M, 100th Pennsylvania Infantry Regiment	Battle of Fort Stedman, Petersburg, Virginia	Mar 25, 1865	Capture of flag of 31st Georgia Infantry (C.S.A.).
Medal of Honor winner Paul Ambrose Oliver	Paul A. Oliver	Army	Captain	(New York (state)) Company D, 12th New York Volunteer Infantry	Battle of Resaca, Georgia	May 15, 1864	While acting as aide assisted in preventing a disaster caused by Union troops firing into each other
Medal of Honor winner Stephen O'Neill	Stephen O'Neill	Army	Corporal	(United States) Company E, 7th U. S. Infantry Regiment	Battle of Chancellorsville, Virginia	May 1, 1863	Took up the colors from the hands of the color bearer who had been shot down and bore them through the remainder of the battle.
Medal of Honor winner John N Opel	John N. Opel	Army	Private	Company G, 7th Indiana Infantry Regiment	Battle of the Wilderness, Virginia	May 5, 1864	Capture of flag of 50th Virginia Infantry (C.S.A.).
Medal of Honor winner David Orbansky	David Orbansky	Army	Private	Company B, 58th Ohio Infantry	Shiloh, Tennessee; Vicksburg, Mississippi, etc.	1862 – 1863	Gallantry in actions.
Medal of Honor winner Charles Alvin Orr	Charles A. Orr	Army	Private	(New York (state)) Company G, 187th New York Volunteer Infantry	Battle of Boydton Plank Road, Petersburg, Virginia	Oct 27, 1864	This soldier and two others, voluntarily and under fire, rescued several wounded and helpless soldiers.
Medal of Honor winner Robert Levan Orr	Robert L. Orr	Army	Major	61st Pennsylvania Infantry Regiment	Third Battle of Petersburg, Virginia	Apr 2, 1865	Carried the colors at the head of the column in the assault after two color bearers had been shot down.
—	John Ortega	Navy	Seaman	(United States Navy) USS Saratoga	Aboard USS Saratoga	December 31, 1864	Served as seaman during actions on two occasions. Carrying out his duties courageously during these actions, Ortega conducted himself gallantly through both periods. Promoted to acting master's mate.
Medal of Honor winner Jacob George Orth	Jacob G. Orth	Army	Corporal	Company D, 28th Pennsylvania Volunteer Infantry	Battle of Antietam, Maryland	Sep 17, 1862	Capture of flag of 7th South Carolina Infantry (C.S.A.), in hand-to-hand encounter, although he was wounded in the shoulder.
Medal of Honor winner William Henry Osborne	William H. Osborne	Army	Private	Company C, 29th Massachusetts Volunteer Infantry Regiment	Battle of Malvern Hill, Virginia	Jul 1, 1862	Although wounded and carried to the rear, he secured a rifle and voluntarily returned to the front, where, failing to find his own regiment, he joined another and fought with it until again severely wounded and taken prisoner.
—	Albert Oss	Army	Private	Company B, 11th New Jersey Volunteer Infantry Regiment	Battle of Chancellorsville, Virginia	May 3, 1863	Remained in the rifle pits after the others had retreated, firing constantly, and contesting the ground step by step.
—	Jacob H. Overturf	Army	Private	Company K, 83rd Indiana Volunteer Infantry Regiment	Battle of Vicksburg, Mississippi	May 22, 1863	Gallantry in the charge of the "volunteer storming party."
Medal of Honor winner Miles Mason Oviatt USMC	Miles M. Oviatt	Marine Corps	Corporal	(United States Marine Corps) USS Brooklyn	Aboard USS Brooklyn, Battle of Mobile Bay	Aug 5, 1864	For actions against rebel forts and gunboats and with the ram Tennessee in Mobile Bay.

== P ==
Recipients are listed alphabetically by last name. Posthumous receipt is denoted by an asterisk.

This along with the *, indicates that the Medal of Honor was awarded posthumously

Image	Name	Service	Rank	Unit/Command	Place of action	Date of action	Notes
—	Loron F. Packard	Army	Private	(New York (state)) Company E, 5th New York Cavalry Regiment	Raccoon Ford, Virginia	November 27, 1863	After his command had retreated, this soldier, voluntarily and alone, returned to the assistance of a comrade and rescued him from the hands of three armed Confederates.
George H. Palmer	George H. Palmer	Army	Musician	1st Illinois Cavalry Regiment	Lexington, Missouri	September 20, 1861	Volunteered to fight in the trenches and also led a charge which resulted in the recapture of a Union hospital, together with Confederate sharpshooters then occupying the same.
Medal of Honor winner John Gideon Palmer	John G. Palmer	Army	Corporal	21st Connecticut Volunteer Infantry Regiment	Battle of Fredericksburg, Virginia	Dec 13, 1862	First of six men who volunteered to assist gunner of a battery upon which the enemy was concentrating its fire, and fought with the battery until the close of the engagement. His commanding officer felt he would never see this man alive again.
	William J. Palmer	Army	Colonel	15th Pennsylvania Cavalry	Red Hill, Alabama	Jan 14, 1865	Attacked and defeated a superior force of the enemy without losing a man.
Photo of Thomas Parker taken after the Civil War	Thomas Parker	Army	Corporal	Company B, 2nd Rhode Island Infantry	Third Battle of Petersburg, Virginia and Battle of Sayler's Creek, Virginia	Apr 2, 1865 and Apr 6, 1865	Planted the first color on the enemy's works. Carried the regimental colors over the creek after the regiment had broken and been repulsed.
—	William Parker	Navy	Captain of the Afterguard	(United States Navy) USS Cayuga	Aboard USS Cayuga, Battle of Forts Jackson and St. Philip	April 24, 1862 – April 25, 1862	At the wheel on board USS Cayuga during the capture of Forts St. Philip and Jackson, and New Orleans, 24 and 25 April 1862.
—	George Parks	Navy	Captain of the Forecastle	(United States Navy) USS Richmond	Aboard USS Richmond, Battle of Mobile Bay	Aug 5, 1864	On board USS Richmond during action against rebel forts and gunboats and with the ram Tennessee in Mobile Bay, 5 August 1864.
Medal of Honor winner Henry Jeremiah Parks	Henry J. Parks	Army	Private	(New York (state)) Company A, 9th New York Volunteer Cavalry Regiment	Battle of Cedar Creek, Virginia	Oct 19, 1864	While alone and in advance of his unit and attempting to cut off the retreat of a supply wagon, he fought and sent to flight a Confederate color bearer. After capturing the color bearer and leaving him in the rear, he returned to the front and captured three more wagons and drivers.
—	James W. Parks	Army	Corporal	Company F, 11th Missouri Volunteer Infantry Regiment	Battle of Nashville, Tennessee	Dec 16, 1864	Capture of flag
A white man with dark hair and a thin mustache sitting on a chair, his hands resting on his leg. He is wearing a military jacket and overcoat.	Jacob Parrott	Army	Private	Company K, 33rd Ohio Volunteer Infantry Regiment	Great Locomotive Chase, Georgia	Apr 1862	First Medal of Honor recipient.
—	Joel Parsons	Army	Private	Company B, 4th West Virginia Volunteer Infantry Regiment	Battle of Vicksburg, Mississippi	May 22, 1863	Gallantry in the charge of the "volunteer storming party."
Medal of Honor winner John Henry Patterson	John H. Patterson	Army	First Lieutenant	(United States) 11th U.S. Infantry Regiment	Battle of the Wilderness, Virginia	May 5, 1864	Under the heavy fire of the advancing enemy, picked up and carried several hundred yards to a place of safety a wounded officer of his regiment who was helpless and would otherwise have been burned in the forest.
—	John T. Patterson	Army	Principal Musician	122nd Ohio Infantry	Second Battle of Winchester, Virginia	Jun 14, 1863	With one companion, voluntarily went in front of the Union line, under a heavy fire from the enemy, and carried back a helpless wounded comrade, thus saving him from death or capture.
William H. Paul, c. 1901	William H. Paul	Army	Private	Company E, 90th Pennsylvania Infantry Regiment	Battle of Antietam, Maryland	Sep 17, 1862	Under a most withering and concentrated fire, voluntarily picked up the colors of his regiment, when the bearer and 2 of the color guard had been killed, and bore them aloft throughout the entire battle.
Medal of Honor winner Byron E Pay	Byron E. Pay	Army	Private	Company H, 2nd Minnesota Volunteer Infantry Regiment	Nolensville, Tennessee	Feb 15, 1863	Was one of a detachment of 16 men who heroically defended a wagon train against the attack of 125 cavalry, repulsed the attack and saved the train.
—	Irvin C. Payne	Army	Corporal	(New York (state)) Company M, 2nd New York Cavalry Regiment	Battle of Sayler's Creek, Virginia	Apr 6, 1865	Capture of Virginia State colors.
Medal of Honor winner Thomas H L Payne	Thomas H. L. Payne	Army	First Lieutenant	Company E, 37th Illinois Infantry Regiment	Battle of Fort Blakeley, Alabama	Apr 9, 1865	While acting regimental quartermaster, learning of an expected assault, requested assignment to a company that had no commissioned officers present; was so assigned, and was one of the first to lead his men into the enemy's works.
—	Platt Pearsall	Army	Corporal	Company C, 30th Ohio Infantry	Battle of Vicksburg, Mississippi	May 22, 1863	Gallantry in the charge of the "volunteer storming party."
	Alfred L. Pearson	Army	Colonel	155th Pennsylvania Infantry Regiment	Battle of Lewis's Farm, Virginia	Mar 29, 1865	Seeing a brigade forced back by the enemy, he seized his regimental color, called on his men to follow him, and advanced upon the enemy under a severe fire. The whole brigade took up the advance, the lost ground was regained, and the enemy was repulsed.
A U.S. Navy poster featuring Pease	Joachim Pease	Navy	Seaman	(United States Navy) USS Kearsarge	Aboard USS Kearsarge off Cherbourg, France	June 19, 1864	Served as seaman on board USS Kearsarge when she destroyed the raider Alabama off Cherbourg, France, 19 June 1864.
Cassius Peck	Cassius Peck	Army	Private	Company F, 1st United States Sharpshooters	Near Blackburn's Ford, Virginia	Sep 19, 1862	Took command of such soldiers as he could get and attacked and captured a Confederate battery of four guns. Also, while on a reconnaissance, overtook and captured a Confederate soldier.
—	Oscar E. Peck	Navy	Second Class Boy	(United States Navy) USS Varuna	Aboard USS Varuna, Battle of Forts Jackson and St. Philip	April 24, 1862	Peck served as second class boy on board Varuna during an attack on Forts Jackson and St. Philip, 24 April 1862.
	Theodore S. Peck	Army	First Lieutenant	Company H, 9th Vermont Volunteer Infantry Regiment	Newport Barracks, North Carolina	Feb 2, 1864	By long and persistent resistance and burning the bridges, kept a superior force of the enemy at bay and covered the retreat of the garrison.
Medal of Honor winner James Kastor Peirsol	James K. Peirsol	Army	Sergeant	Company F, 13th Ohio Volunteer Cavalry Regiment	Paines Crossroads, Virginia	Apr 5, 1865	Capture of flag
Portrait of a white man with a mustache and thinning hair, wearing a jacket with two medals pinned to the left breast. The portrait is in a shield-shaped frame next to a sketch of an American flag.	William Pelham	Navy	Landsman	(United States Navy) USS Hartford	Aboard USS Hartford, Battle of Mobile Bay	Aug 5, 1864	On board the flagship USS Hartford during successful actions against Fort Morgan, rebel gunboats and the ram Tennessee in Mobile Bay, 5 August 1864.
Head and shoulders of a white man with dark hair and a mustache, wearing a double-breasted military jacket with fringed shoulder boards.	Galusha Pennypacker	Army	Colonel	97th Pennsylvania Infantry Regiment	Second Battle of Fort Fisher, North Carolina	Jan 15, 1865	Gallantly led the charge over a traverse and planted the colors of one of his regiments thereon, was severely wounded.
Medal of Honor winner Patrick Henry Pentzer	Patrick H. Pentzer	Army	Captain	Company C, 97th Illinois Infantry Regiment	Battle of Fort Blakeley, Alabama	Apr 9, 1865	Among the first to enter the enemy's entrenchments, he received the surrender of a Confederate general officer and his headquarters flag.
—	Thomas Perry	Navy	Boatswain's Mate	(United States Navy) USS Kearsarge	Aboard off Cherbourg, France	June 19, 1864	Served as boatswain's mate on board USS Kearsarge when she destroyed the raider Alabama off Cherbourg, France, 19 June 1864.
—	Joseph Pesch	Army	Private	Battery A, 1st Missouri Light Artillery	Battle of Grand Gulf, Mississippi	Apr 28, 1863 – Apr 29, 1863	With two comrades voluntarily took position on board the steamer Cheeseman, in charge of all the guns and ammunition of the battery, and remained in charge of the same, although the steamer became unmanageable and was exposed for some time to a heavy fire from the enemy.
—	Henry C. Peters	Army	Private	Company B, 47th Ohio Infantry	Battle of Vicksburg, Mississippi	May 3, 1863	Was one of a party that volunteered and attempted to run the enemy's batteries with a steam tug and two barges loaded with subsistence stores
—	Alfred Peterson	Navy	Seaman	(United States Navy) USS Commodore Perry	Aboard USS Commodore Perry	October 3, 1862	On board USS Commodore Perry in the attack upon Franklin, Virginia, 3 October 1862.
Medal of Honor winner Philip Petty	Philip Petty	Army	Sergeant	Company A, 136th Pennsylvania Infantry	Battle of Fredericksburg, Virginia	Dec 13, 1862	Took up the colors as they fell out of the hands of the wounded color bearer and carried them forward in the charge.
	Charles E. Phelps	Army	Colonel	7th Maryland Infantry Regiment	Laurel Hill, Virginia	May 8, 1864	Rode to the head of the assaulting column, then much broken by severe losses and faltering under the close fire of artillery, placed himself conspicuously in front of the troops, and gallantly rallied and led them to within a few feet of the enemy's works, where he was severely wounded and captured.
—	Josiah Phillips	Army	Private	Company E, 148th Pennsylvania Infantry Regiment	Battle of Sutherland's Station, Virginia	Apr 2, 1865	Capture of flag
—	William Phinney	Navy	Boatswain's Mate	(United States Navy) USS Lackawanna	Aboard USS Lackawanna, Battle of Mobile Bay	Aug 5, 1864	On board USS Lackawanna during successful attacks against Fort Morgan, rebel gunboats and the ram Tennessee in Mobile Bay, 5 August 1864.
	Frederick Phisterer	Army	First Lieutenant	(United States) 18th U.S. Infantry Regiment	Battle of Stones River, Murfreesboro, Tennessee	Dec 31, 1862	Voluntarily conveyed, under a heavy fire, information to the commander of a battalion of regular troops by which the battalion was saved from capture or annihilation.
Medal of Honor winner Alonzo H Pickle	Alonzo H. Pickle	Army	Sergeant	Company B, 1st Battalion Minnesota Infantry	Deep Bottom, Virginia	Aug 14, 1864	At the risk of his life, voluntarily went to the assistance of a wounded officer lying close to the enemy's lines and, under fire carried him to a place of safety.
Medal of Honor winner Edward M Pike	Edward M. Pike	Army	First Sergeant	Company A, 33rd Regiment Illinois Volunteer Infantry	Battle of Cotton Plant, Arkansas	Jul 7, 1862	While the troops were falling back before a superior force, this soldier, assisted by one companion, and while under severe fire at close range, saved a cannon from capture by the enemy.
Head and shoulders of a white man with bushy sideburns connecting to a mustache, wearing a suit coat and bow tie.	Samuel E. Pingree	Army	Captain	Company F, 3rd Vermont Volunteer Infantry Regiment	Battle of Lee's Mills, Virginia	Apr 16, 1862	Gallantly led his company across a wide, deep creek, drove the enemy from the rifle pits, which were within 2 yards (1.8 m) of the farther bank, and remained at the head of his men until a second time severely wounded.
Medal of Honor winner Charles H Pinkham	Charles H. Pinkham	Army	Sergeant Major	57th Massachusetts Volunteer Infantry Regiment	Battle of Fort Stedman, Virginia	Mar 25, 1865	Captured the flag of the 57th North Carolina Infantry (C.S.A.) and saved his own colors by tearing them from the staff while the enemy was in the camp.
Head and shoulders of a balding black man with a goatee, wearing a suit coat, vest, and bow tie. On the jacket's left breast is a row of three medals.	Robert Pinn	Army	First Sergeant	Company I, 5th Regiment United States Colored Troops	Battle of Chaffin's Farm, Virginia	Sep 29, 1864	Took command of his company after all the officers had been killed or wounded and gallantly led it in battle.
	James Pipes	Army	Captain	Company A, 140th Pennsylvania Infantry	Battle of Gettysburg, Pennsylvania and Second Battle of Ream's Station, Virginia	Jul 2, 1863 and Aug 25, 1864	While a sergeant and retiring with his company before the rapid advance of the enemy at Gettysburg, he and a companion stopped and carried to a place of safety a wounded and helpless comrade; in this act both he and his companion were severely wounded. A year later, at Reams Station, Virginia, while commanding a skirmish line, voluntarily assisted in checking a flank movement of the enemy, and while so doing was severely wounded, suffering the loss of an arm.
—	George J. Pitman	Army	Sergeant	(New York (state)) Company C, 1st New York Volunteer Cavalry	Battle of Sayler's Creek, Virginia	Apr 6, 1865	Capture of flag of the Sumter Heavy Artillery (C.S.A.).
Head of a balding white man with a goatee, wearing a suit coat and tie.	William Pittenger	Army	Sergeant	Company G, 2nd Ohio Infantry	Great Locomotive Chase, Georgia	Apr 1862	Fifth person to receive Medal of Honor
Medal of Honor winner Henry E Plant	Henry E. Plant	Army	Corporal	Company F, 14th Michigan Volunteer Infantry Regiment	Battle of Bentonville, North Carolina	Mar 19, 1865	Rushed into the midst of the enemy and rescued the colors, the color bearer having fallen mortally wounded.
Medal of Honor winner George Crawford Platt	George C. Platt	Army	Private	(United States) Troop H, 6th U.S. Cavalry Regiment	Battle of Fairfield, Pennsylvania	Jul 3, 1863	Seized the regimental flag upon the death of the standard bearer in a hand-to-hand fight and prevented it from falling into the hands of the enemy.
Medal of Honor winner William Plimley	William Plimley	Army	First Lieutenant	(New York (state)) Company F, 120th New York Volunteer Infantry	Hatcher's Run, Third Battle of Petersburg, Virginia	Apr 2, 1865	While acting as aide to a general officer, voluntarily accompanied a regiment in an assault on the enemy's works and acted as leader of the movement which resulted in the rout of the enemy and the capture of a large number of prisoners.
Medal of Honor winner George H. Plowman	George H. Plowman	Army	Sergeant Major	3rd Maryland Infantry Regiment	Second Battle of Petersburg, Virginia	Jun 17, 1864	Recaptured the colors of the 2d Pennsylvania Provisional Artillery.
Medal of Honor winner Thomas Plunkett	Thomas Plunkett	Army	Sergeant	Company E, 21st Massachusetts Volunteer Infantry	Fredericksburg, Virginia	December 11, 1862	Seized the colors of his regiment, the color bearer having been shot down, and bore them to the front where both his arms were carried off by a shell.
—	George F. Pond	Army	Private	Company C, 3rd Wisconsin Cavalry	Drywood, Kansas	May 15, 1864	With two companions, attacked a greatly superior force of guerrillas, routed them, and rescued several prisoners.
	James Pond	Army	First Lieutenant	Company C, 3rd Wisconsin Cavalry	Battle of Baxter Springs, Kansas	Oct 6, 1863	While in command of two companies of Cavalry, was surprised and attacked by several times his own number of guerrillas, but gallantly rallied his men, and after a severe struggle drove the enemy outside the fortifications. 1st Lt. Pond then went outside the works and, alone and unaided, fired a howitzer three times, throwing the enemy into confusion and causing him to retire.
—	William B. Poole	Navy	Quartermaster	(United States Navy) USS Kearsarge	Aboard USS Kearsarge off Cherbourg, France	June 19, 1864	He was serving as a Quartermaster on the sloop-of-war USS Kearsarge when she sank the commerce raider CSS Alabama off Cherbourg, France. He was awarded his Medal of Honor for gallantry under fire exhibited while steering the ship.
—	Ambrose Porter	Army	Commissary Sergeant	Company D, 12th Missouri Volunteer Cavalry	Tallahatchie River, Mississippi	Aug 7, 1864	Was one of four volunteers who swam the river under a brisk fire of the enemy's sharpshooters and brought over a ferry boat by means of which the troops crossed and dislodged the enemy from a strong position.
A white man with a Van Dyke beard and mustache sitting in a chair, wearing a baggy double-breasted military jacket.	Horace Porter	Army	Captain	(United States) US Army Ordnance Department	Battle of Chickamauga, Georgia	Sep 20, 1863	While acting as a volunteer aide, at a critical moment when the lines were broken, rallied enough fugitives to hold the ground under heavy fire long enough to effect the escape of wagon trains and batteries.
Head and torso of a young white man wearing a full military uniform, including a cap, straps crossing his chest, and a rifle leaning against his right shoulder.	John Reed Porter	Army	Private	Company G, 21st Ohio Infantry	Great Locomotive Chase, Georgia	Apr 1862	One of the 19 of 22 men (including 2 civilians) who, by direction of General Mitchell (or Buell), penetrated nearly 200 miles south into enemy territory and captured a railroad train at Big Shanty, Georgia, in an attempt to destroy the bridges and track between Chattanooga and Atlanta.
—	William Porter	Army	Sergeant	Company H, 1st New Jersey Volunteer Cavalry	Battle of Sayler's Creek, Virginia	Apr 6, 1865	Among the first to check the enemy's countercharge.
	Philip S. Post	Army	Colonel	59th Illinois Infantry Regiment	Battle of Nashville, Tennessee	Dec 15, 1864 – Dec 16, 1864	Led his brigade in an attack on a strong position under intense fire. Later a U.S. Representative for Illinois.
Medal of Honor winner James Parke Postles	James P. Postles	Army	Captain	Company A, 1st Regiment Delaware Volunteer Infantry	Battle of Gettysburg, Pennsylvania	Jul 2, 1863	Voluntarily delivered an order in the face of heavy fire of the enemy.
—	George W. Potter	Army	Private	Battery G, 1st Rhode Island Volunteer Light Artillery	Third Battle of Petersburg, Virginia	Apr 2, 1865	Was one of a detachment of 20 picked artillerymen who voluntarily accompanied an infantry assaulting party, and who turned upon the enemy the guns captured in the assault.
—	Norman F. Potter	Army	First Sergeant	(New York (state)) Company E, 149th New York Infantry	Battle of Lookout Mountain, Tennessee	Nov 24, 1863	Capture of flag (Bragg's army).
Medal of Honor winner William Henry Powell	William Henry Powell	Army	Major	2nd West Virginia Volunteer Cavalry Regiment	Sinking Creek Raid, Virginia (now West Virginia)	Nov 26, 1862	Distinguished services in raid, where with 20 men, he charged and captured the enemy's camp, 500 strong, without the loss of man or gun.
—	Albert Power	Army	Private	Company A, 3rd Iowa Volunteer Cavalry Regiment	Battle of Pea Ridge, Arkansas	Mar 7, 1862	Under a heavy fire and at great personal risk went to the aid of a dismounted comrade who was surrounded by the enemy, took him up on his own horse, and carried him to a place of safety.
Medal of Honor winner Wesley James Powers	Wesley J. Powers	Army	Corporal	Company F, 147th Illinois Infantry Regiment	Oostanaula, Georgia	Apr 3, 1865	Voluntarily swam the river under heavy fire and secured a ferryboat, by means of which the command crossed.
—	George Prance	Navy	Captain of the Main Top	(United States Navy) USS Ticonderoga	Aboard USS Ticonderoga, First and Second Battles of Fort Fisher	Dec 1864 – Jan 1865	On board USS Ticonderoga during attacks on Fort Fisher, 24 and 25 December 1864; and 13 to 15 January 1865.
Medal of Honor winner Joseph Rollin Prentice	Joseph R. Prentice	Army	Private	(United States) Company E, 19th U.S. Infantry Regiment	Battle of Stones River, Murfreesboro, Tennessee	Dec 31, 1862	Voluntarily rescued the body of his commanding officer, who had fallen mortally wounded. He brought off the field his mortally wounded leader under direct and constant rifle fire.
—	John Preston	Navy	Landsman	(United States Navy) USS Oneida	Aboard USS Oneida, Battle of Mobile Bay	Aug 5, 1864	Served on board USS Oneida in the engagement at Mobile Bay, 5 August 1864.
Medal of Honor winner Noble Delance Preston	Noble D. Preston	Army	First Lieutenant and Commissary	(New York (state)) 10th New York Volunteer Cavalry Regiment	Battle of Trevilian Station, Virginia	Jun 11, 1864	Voluntarily led a charge in which he was severely wounded.
—	Edward Price	Navy	Coxswain	(United States Navy) USS Brooklyn	Aboard USS Brooklyn, Battle of Mobile Bay	Aug 5, 1864	On board USS Brooklyn during successful attacks against Fort Morgan, rebel gunboats and the ram Tennessee in Mobile Bay.
—	George Province	Navy	Ordinary Seaman	(United States Navy) USS Santiago de Cuba	Aboard USS Santiago de Cuba, Second Battle of Fort Fisher	Jan 15, 1865	On board USS Santiago de Cuba during the assault on Fort Fisher.
Medal of Honor winner Hiram W Purcell	Hiram W. Purcell	Army	Sergeant	Company G, 104th Pennsylvania Infantry	Battle of Seven Pines, Virginia	May 31, 1862	While carrying the regimental colors on the retreat he returned to face the advancing enemy, flag in hand, and saved the other colors, which would otherwise have been captured.
	James J. Purman	Army	Second Lieutenant	Company A, 140th Pennsylvania Infantry	Battle of Gettysburg, Pennsylvania	Jul 2, 1863	Voluntarily assisted a wounded comrade to a place of apparent safety while the enemy were in close proximity; he received the fire of the enemy and a wound which resulted in the amputation of his left leg.
Medal of Honor winner Edgar Pierpont Putnam	Edgar P. Putnam	Army	Sergeant	(New York (state)) Company D, 9th New York Volunteer Cavalry Regiment	Crumps Creek, Virginia	May 27, 1864	With a small force on a reconnaissance drove off a strong body of the enemy, charged into another force of the enemy's cavalry and stampeded them, taking 27 prisoners.
—	Winthrop D. Putnam	Army	Corporal	Company A, 77th Illinois Infantry	Battle of Vicksburg, Mississippi	May 22, 1863	Carried, with others, by hand, a cannon up to and fired it through an embrasure of the enemy's works.
—	George Pyne	Navy	Seaman	(United States Navy) USS Magnolia	USS Magnolia Landing Party, Battle of Natural Bridge	Mar 5, 1865 – Mar 6, 1865	Served as a seaman on board USS Magnolia, St. Marks, Florida, 5 and 6 March 1865.

== See also ==
- List of Medal of Honor recipients
