= Alexander Mack (disambiguation) =

Alexander Mack was one of the founders of the Schwarzenau Brethren.

Alexander Mack may also refer to:

- Alexander Mack (Medal of Honor) (c. 1834–1907), Civil War Medal of Honor recipient
- Alex Mack (born 1985), American football player
- Alex Mack (character), a character in The Secret World of Alex Mack
