= Charles Marquette =

American Civil War Medal of Honor recipient

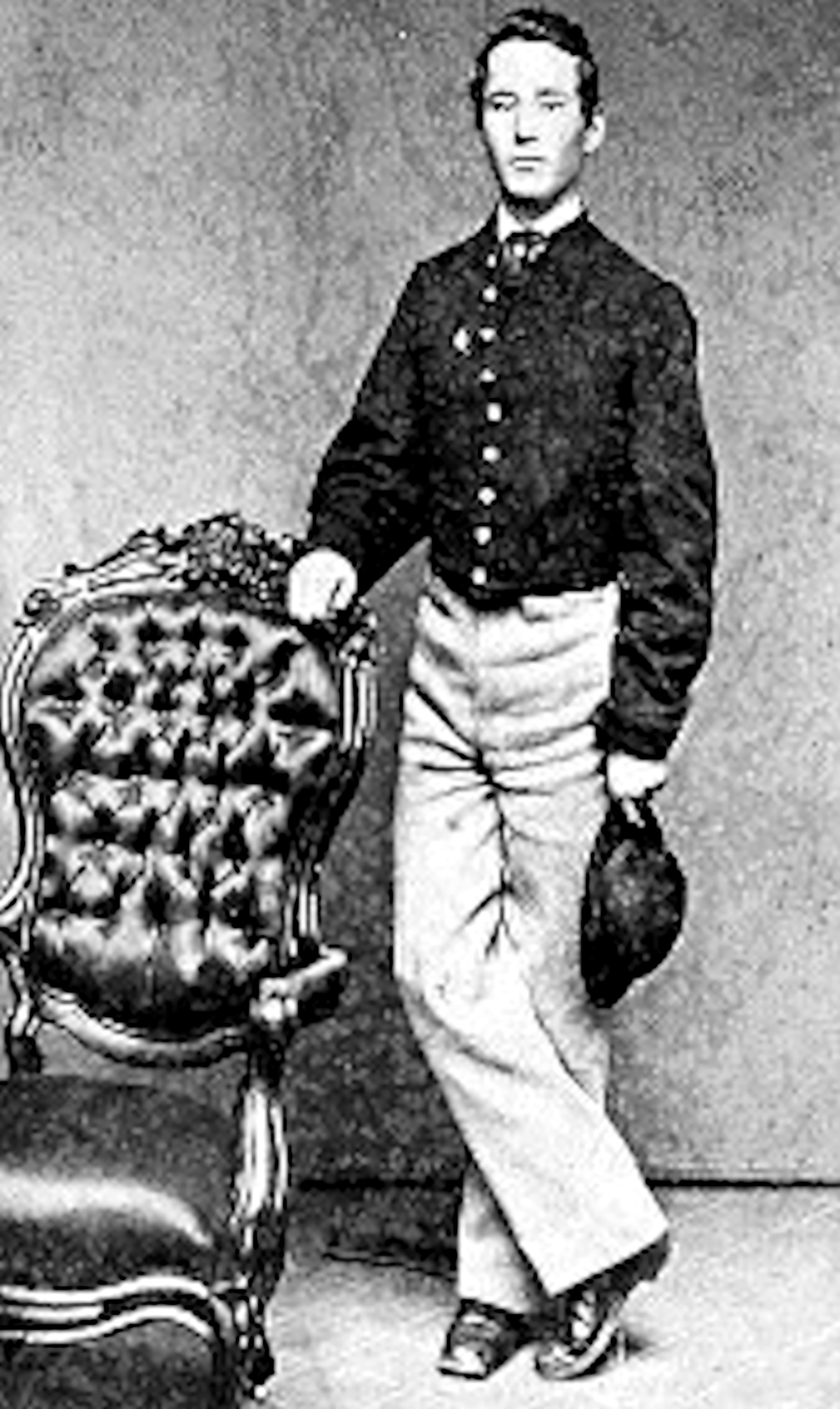
- Marquette in 1865
- Born: February 9, 1845; Lebanon County, Pennsylvania, US
- Died: November 25, 1907 (aged 62)
- Military career
- Allegiance: United States of America
- Branch: United States Army
- Service years: 1861 - 1865
- Rank: Sergeant
- Units: Company F, 93rd Pennsylvania Infantry Regiment
- Conflicts: American Civil War
- Awards: Medal of Honor

Charles Marquette (1845–1907) was a Sergeant in the United States Army and a Medal of Honor recipient for his role in the American Civil War.

Marquette joined the army from Lebanon, Pennsylvania in October 1861 and was mustered out in June 1865

== Medal of Honor citation ==
Rank and organization: Sergeant, Company F, 93d Pennsylvania Infantry. Place and date: At Petersburg, Va., April 2, 1865. Entered service at: Lebanon County, Pa. Birth: Lebanon County, Pa. Date of issue: May 10, 1865.

Citation:

Sergeant Marquette, although wounded, was one of the first to plant colors on the enemy's breastworks.

== See also ==
- List of Medal of Honor recipients
- List of American Civil War Medal of Honor recipients: M–P
