= Richard C. Mangam =

United States Private with Medal of Honor

Richard Christopher Mangam
- Born: December 21, 1841; Ireland
- Died: November 18, 1893 (aged 51)
- Burial place: Worcester, New York, US
- Military career
- Allegiance: United States; Union
- Branch: United States Army; Union Army
- Rank: Private
- Units: Company H, 148th Regiment New York Volunteer Infantry
- Conflicts: American Civil War
- Awards: Medal of Honor

Richard Christopher Mangam (December 21, 1841 – November 18, 1893) was a private in the United States Army and a Medal of Honor recipient for his role in the American Civil War.

He is buried in Maple Grove Cemetery in Worcester, New York.

== Medal of Honor citation ==
Rank and organization: Private, Company H, 148th New York Infantry. Place and date: At Hatchers Run, Va., April 2, 1865. Entered service at: ------. Birth: Ireland. Date of issue: September 21, 1888.

Citation:

Capture of flag of 8th Mississippi Infantry (C.S.A.).

== See also ==
- List of American Civil War Medal of Honor recipients: M–P
