= George Marsh (Medal of Honor) =

- Born: Brookfield, Illinois
- Died: June 18, 1915
- Burial place: Ottawa, Illinois
- Military career
- Allegiance: United States of America
- Branch: United States Army
- Rank: Sergeant
- Units: Company D, 104th Illinois Infantry
- Conflicts: American Civil War
- Awards: Medal of Honor

Sergeant George Marsh (died June 18, 1915) was an American soldier who fought in the American Civil War. Marsh received his country's highest award for bravery during combat, the Medal of Honor. Marsh's medal was won for capturing a stockade and saving a bridge over the Elk River in Tennessee on July 2, 1863. He was honored with the award on September 17, 1897.

Marsh was born in Brookfield, Illinois, where he entered service, and was buried in Ottawa, Illinois.

== Medal of Honor citation ==
The President of the United States of America, in the name of Congress, takes pleasure in presenting the Medal of Honor to Sergeant George Marsh, United States Army, for extraordinary heroism on 2 July 1863, while serving with Company D, 104th Illinois Infantry, in action at Elk River, Tennessee. Sergeant Marsh voluntarily led a small party and, under a heavy fire, captured a stockade and saved the bridge.

== See also ==
- List of American Civil War Medal of Honor recipients: M–P
