= William H. Mathews (soldier) =

Union Army Medal of Honor recipient

William Henry Mathews
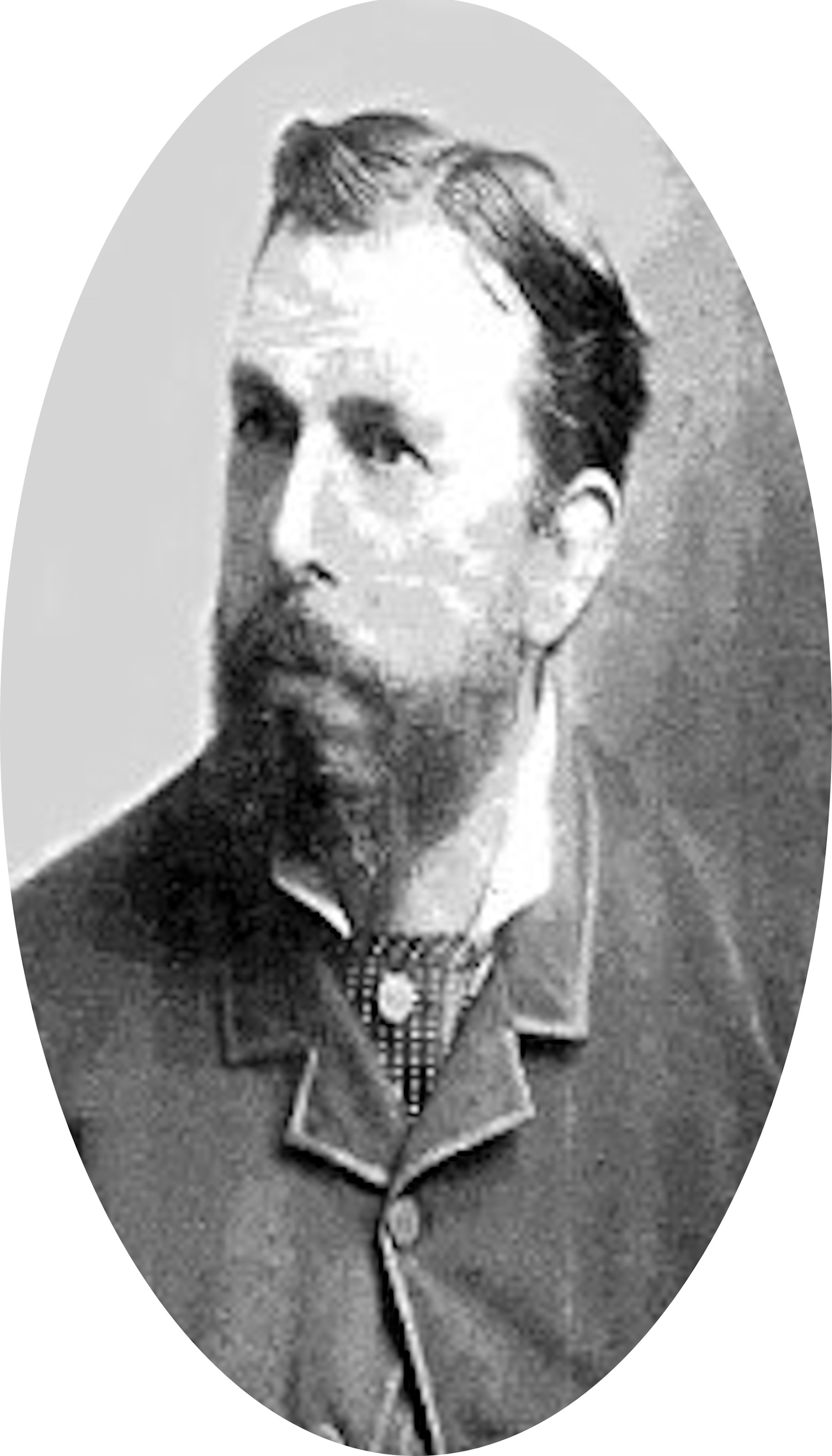
- Elihu H. Mason
- Born: March 3, 1844; Devizes, Wiltshire, England
- Died: February 7, 1928 (aged 83); New York City, US
- Burial place: Green-Wood Cemetery
- Military career
- Allegiance: United States; Union
- Branch: US Army; Union Army
- Service years: 1861 - 1865
- Rank: First Sergeant
- Unit: 2nd Maryland Infantry Regiment (Union)
- Conflicts: American Civil War • Battle of the Crater
- Awards: Medal of Honor

William Mathews (1844–1928) was an American soldier who fought in the American Civil War. Mathews enlisted in 1861 at age 17 in Baltimore, Maryland, under the name Henry Sivel. He served during the Civil War in Company E, 2nd Maryland Volunteer Infantry, rising from private to commander of Company E. He was promoted to sergeant on May 15, 1863, and to first sergeant on June 22, 1863. On January 1, 1864, he reenlisted as a veteran volunteer, retaining his first sergeant rank. He was commissioned as a first police lieutenant October 24, 1864, and a captain June 27, 1865. He was wounded twice, and captured once but quickly paroled. He mustered out of service on July 17, 1865.

Matthews received his country's highest award for bravery during combat, the Medal of Honor.} Mathews's medal was won for capturing prisoners at the Battle of the Crater, Virginia. He was honored with the award on July 10, 1892, under his nom de guerre, Henry Sivel, and the original Medal of Honor was issued under that name. A new medal was issued in 1900 under true name, William H. Mathews

Matthews was born in Devizes, Wiltshire, England, and emigrated with his family to Baltimore, Maryland, where he entered the service. After the war he married Emma Tisdale, with whom he had a daughter Edith Zillah Mathews (1882-1930) and a son William Henry Mathews, Jr. (1885-1885). He remained with Emma to his death at 83 in 1928 in Brooklyn.

== Medal of Honor citation ==
The President of the United States of America, in the name of Congress, takes pleasure in presenting the Medal of Honor to First Sergeant William Henry Mathews, United States Army, for extraordinary heroism on 30 July 1864, while serving with Company E, 2d Maryland Veteran Infantry, in action at Petersburg, Virginia. Finding himself among a squad of Confederates, First Sergeant Mathews fired into them, killing one, and was himself wounded, but succeeded in bringing in a sergeant and two men of the 17th South Carolina Regiment (Confederate States of America) as prisoners.

== See also ==
- List of American Civil War Medal of Honor recipients: M–P

== Bibliography ==
- "William Henry Mathews". Congressional Medal of Honor Society. Congressional Medal of Honor Society. February 22, 2022.
- "William Henry Mathews". The Wall of Valor Project. Wall of Valor: The Military Medals Database. August 8, 2020.
- "WWilliam Henry Mathews". Medal of Honor Recipients. The Comprehensive Guide to the Victoria & George Cross. December 15, 2015.
- Wilmer, L. Allison; Jarrett, J. H. & Vernon, Washington Fayette (1899). History and Roster of Maryland Volunteers, War of 1861-5 (pdf). Vol. 1 (1st ed.). Baltimore, MD: General Assembly of Maryland (Guggenheimer, Weil, & Co., printer). pp. 92, 102, 862. OCLC 557631045.
