= Frank Miller (Medal of Honor) =

- Born: c. 1848; New York City, US
- Died: September 12, 1903 (aged 54–55); San Francisco, California, US
- Military career
- Allegiance: United States of America; Union
- Branch: United States Army; Union Army
- Service years: 1864–1865
- Rank: Private
- Units: (New York (state)) Company M, 2nd New York Cavalry Regiment
- Conflicts: American Civil War
- Awards: Medal of Honor

Frank Miller (c. 1848 – September 12, 1903) was a Union soldier, received the Medal of Honor for his capture of the flag of the 25th Battalion Virginia Infantry at the Battle of Sayler's Creek, Virginia on April 6, 1865.

Miller enlisted in the Army from Jamaica, New York in September 1864, and was mustered out in June 1865.

== Medal of Honor citation ==

Rank and Organization:

Private, Company M, 2d New York Cavalry. Place and date: At Sailors Creek, Va., April 6, 1865. Entered service at: Jamaica, N.Y. Birth: New York. Date of issue: April 24, 1865.

Citation:

Capture of flag of 25th Battalion Virginia Infantry (C.S.A.); was taken prisoner, but successfully retained his trophy until recaptured.

== See also ==
- List of American Civil War Medal of Honor recipients: M–P
