= Albert Marsh (Medal of Honor) =

American Civil War Medal of Honor recipient

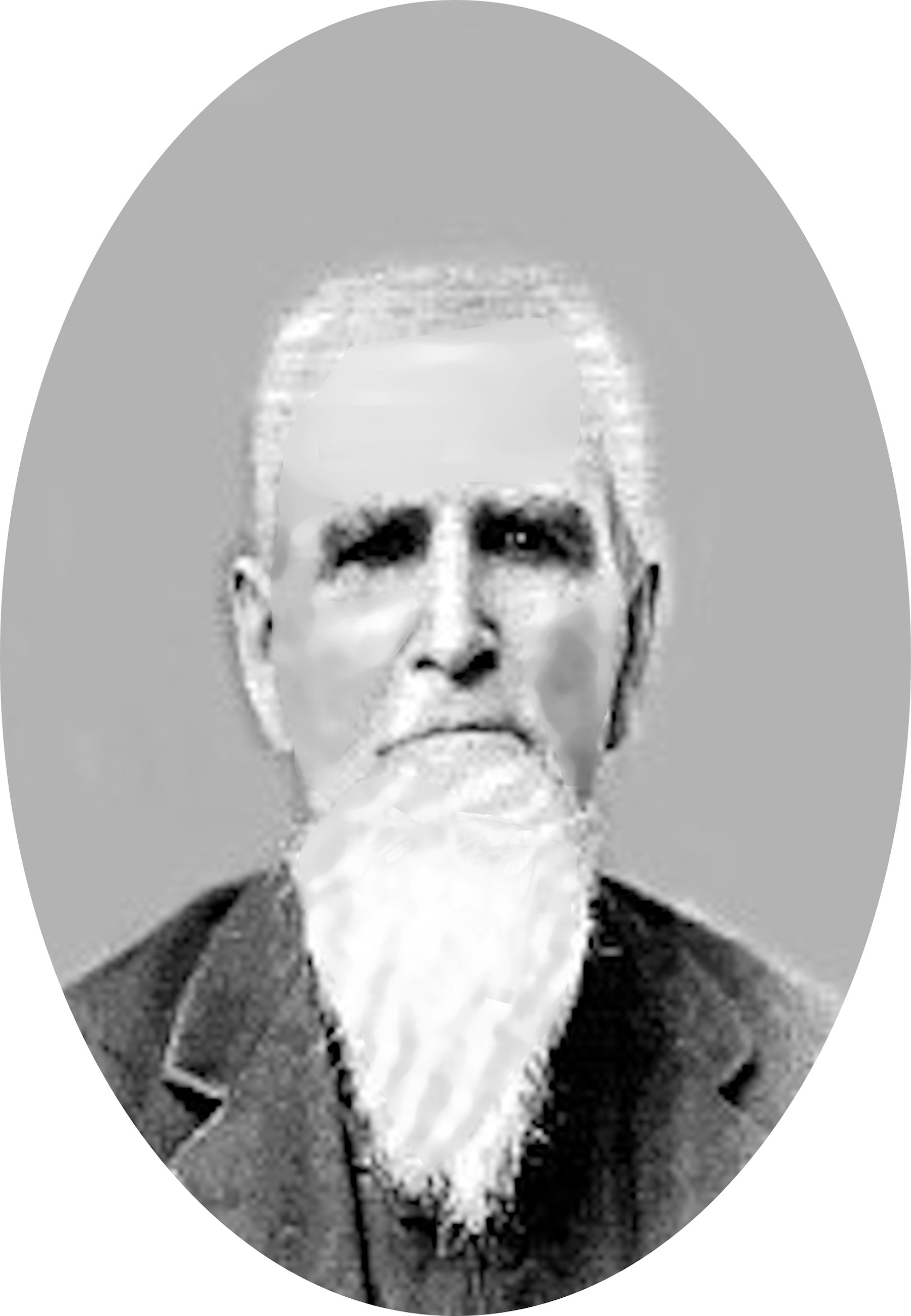
- Marsh in 1895
- Born: February 15, 1831; Cattaraugus County, New York
- Died: February 17, 1895 (aged 64)
- Burial place: Randolph Cemetery Randolph, New York
- Military career
- Allegiance: United States of America; Union
- Branch: United States Army; Union Army
- Service years: 1861–1864
- Rank: Sergeant
- Units: (New York (state)) Company B, 64th New York Volunteer Infantry Regiment
- Conflicts: American Civil War
- Awards: Medal of Honor

Albert Marsh (February 15, 1831 – February 17, 1895) was a sergeant in the United States Army and a Medal of Honor recipient for his role in the American Civil War.

Marsh joined the Union Army from Randolph, New York, in August 1861. He fought in the Battles of Fair Oaks (aka Seven Pines), Gettysburg, and Spotsylvania, and was wounded each time. He was mustered out in September 1864.

He died February 17, 1895, and is buried in Randolph Cemetery, Randolph, New York.

== Medal of Honor citation ==
Rank and organization: Sergeant, Company B, 64th New York Infantry. Place and date: At Spotsylvania, Va., May 12, 1864. Entered service at: Randolph, N.Y. Birth: Cattaraugus County, N.Y. Date of issue: December 1, 1864.

Citation:

Capture of flag.

== See also ==
- List of Medal of Honor recipients
- List of American Civil War Medal of Honor recipients: M–P
