= William Moore (Medal of Honor) =

Medal of Honor recipient from the United States

- Born: May 18, 1837; Boston, Massachusetts, US
- Died: February 16, 1918 (aged 80)
- Burial place: Austin, Texas, US
- Military career
- Allegiance: United States of America; Union
- Branch: United States Navy; Union Navy
- Rank: Boatswain's Mate
- Conflicts: American Civil War
- Awards: Medal of Honor

William Moore (May 18, 1837–February 16, 1918) was a United States Navy Medal of Honor recipient.

== Biography ==
Born in Boston, Massachusetts, he received the Medal of Honor, for heroism, on December 27, 1862, while on the Yazoo River Expedition, Mississippi, during the American Civil War.

He is buried in Austin, Texas.

== Medal of Honor citation ==

Rank and Organization:

Boatswain's Mate, U.S. Navy. Born: 1834, Boston, Massachusetts. Accredited to: Massachusetts. G.O. No.: 32, April 16, 1864.

Citation:

Serving as boatswain's mate on board the U.S.S. Benton during the attack on Haines Bluff, Yazoo River, 27 December 1862. Wounded during the hour and a half engagement in which the enemy had the dead range of the vessel and was punishing her with heavy fire, Moore served courageously in carrying lines to the shore until the Benton was ordered to withdraw.

== See also ==
- List of American Civil War Medal of Honor recipients: M–P
