= George J. Pitman =

American Civil War soldier

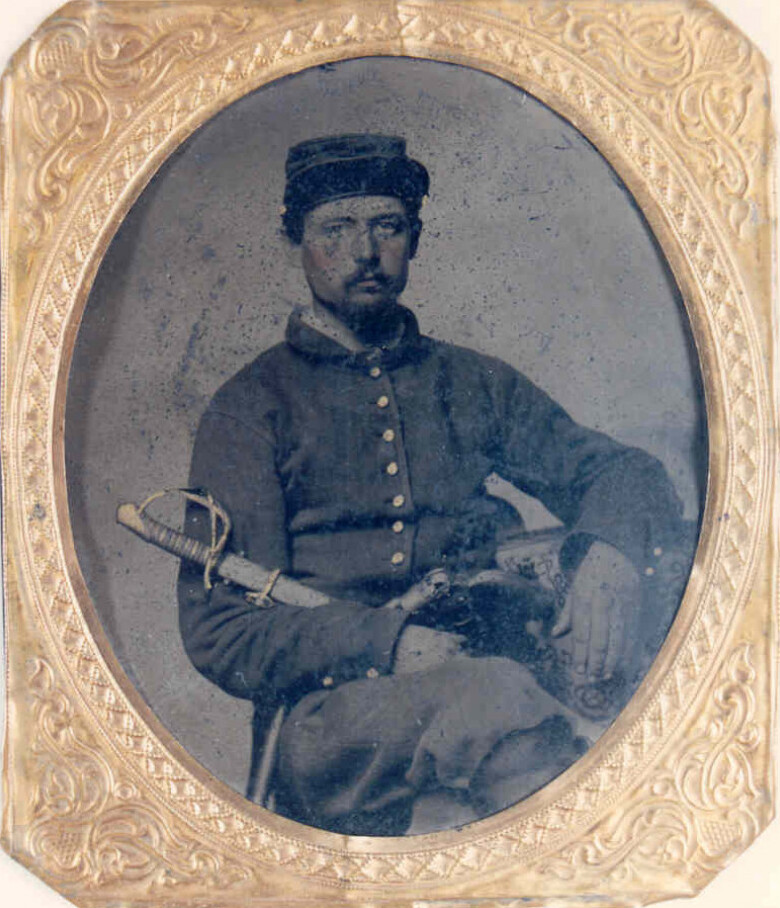
- Born: 1839; Wyoming County, New York
- Died: April 30, 1884 (aged 44–45)
- Burial place: Philadelphia, Pennsylvania
- Military career
- Allegiance: United States of America
- Branch: United States Army
- Rank: Sergeant
- Units: (New York (state)) Company C, 1st New York (Lincoln) Cavalry
- Conflicts: Battle of Sailor's Creek; American Civil War
- Awards: Medal of Honor

Sergeant George J. Pitman (1839 – April 30, 1884) was an American soldier who fought in the American Civil War. Pitman received his country's highest award for bravery during combat, the Medal of Honor. Pitman's medal was won for his capturing of George M Patterson's Battery flag of the 11th Battalion, Georgia Artillery (Sumter's Artillery) at the conclusion of the Battle of Sailor's Creek on April 6, 1865. Pitman was one of three members of the 1st New York (Lincoln) Cavalry who rode to the flag bearers of a Georgia regiment and demanded their flags. He was honored with the award on May 3, 1865.

Pitman was born in Recklesstown in Chesterfield Township, New Jersey, and entered service in Philadelphia in Pennsylvania, where he was buried.

== Medal of Honor citation ==
The President of the United States of America, in the name of Congress, takes pleasure in presenting the Medal of Honor to Sergeant George J. Pitman, United States Army, for extraordinary heroism on 6 April 1865, while serving with Company C, 1st New York Cavalry (Lincoln), in action at Deatonsville (Sailor's Creek), Virginia, for capture of flag of the Sumter Heavy Artillery (Confederate States of America).

== See also ==
- List of American Civil War Medal of Honor recipients: M–P
