= Andrew J. McGonnigle =

United States Army general

- Born: March 4, 1829; New York City
- Died: January 25, 1901 (aged 71); Asheville, North Carolina
- Burial place: Riverside Cemetery, Asheville, North Carolina
- Military career
- Allegiance: United States
- Branch: United States Army; Union Army
- Service years: 1864 - 1893
- Rank: Major; Brevet Colonel
- Unit: (United States) Quartermaster Corps Army of the Shenandoah (Union)
- Conflicts: American Civil War • Battle of Cedar Creek
- Awards: Medal of Honor

Andrew Jackson McGonnigle (March 4, 1829 – January 25, 1901) was a Union Army officer during the American Civil War. He received the Medal of Honor for gallantry during the Battle of Cedar Creek fought near Middletown, Virginia on October 19, 1864. The battle was the decisive engagement of Major General Philip Sheridan's Valley Campaigns of 1864 and was the largest battle fought in the Shenandoah Valley.

McGonnigle was commissioned as a Captain of Volunteers in March 1864, and served as an assistant quartermaster in the Army of the Shenandoah under General Philip Sheridan. He was transferred to the regular army Quartermaster Corps with the same rank in May 1865. He received a promotion to Major in February 1882, and retired from the Army in March 1893.

== Medal of Honor citation ==
The President of the United States of America, in the name of Congress, takes pleasure in presenting the Medal of Honor to Captain & Assistant Quartermaster Andrew Jackson McGonnigle, United States Army, for extraordinary heroism on 19 October 1864, while serving with U.S. Volunteers, in action at Cedar Creek, Virginia. While acting chief quartermaster of General Sheridan's forces operating in the Shenandoah Valley, Captain McGonnigle was severely wounded while voluntarily leading a brigade of infantry and was commended for the greatest gallantry by General Sheridan.

== See also ==
- List of Medal of Honor recipients
- List of American Civil War Medal of Honor recipients: M-P
