= Andrew Miller (Medal of Honor, 1864) =

- Born: c. 1836; Germany
- Military career
- Allegiance: United States of America; Union
- Branch: United States Marine Corps
- Service years: 1854–1866
- Rank: Sergeant
- Unit: USS Richmond
- Conflicts: American Civil War
- Awards: Medal of Honor

Andrew Miller (born c. 1836) was a sergeant serving in the United States Marine Corps during the American Civil War who received the Medal of Honor for his actions in the Battle of Mobile Bay.

== Biography ==
Miller was born in about 1836 in Germany, and entered the Marine Corps from Washington, D.C., August 21, 1854. He was a sergeant assigned to the marine detachment aboard the USS Richmond when it was sent to fight in the American Civil War during the Battle of Mobile Bay.

He was initially discharged from the Marine Corps August 21, 1858, but went on to serve three more enlistments. He honorably discharged the final time on October 20, 1866.

== Medal of Honor citation ==
Rank and organization: Sergeant, U.S. Marine Corps. Born: 1836, Germany. Accredited to: Washington, D.C. G.O. No.: 45, 31 December 1864.

Citation:

As captain of a gun on board the U.S.S. Richmond during action against rebel forts and gunboats and with the ram Tennessee in Mobile Bay, 5 August 1864. Despite damage to his ship and the loss of several men on board as enemy fire raked her decks, Sgt. Miller fought his gun with skill and courage throughout the furious 2-hour battle which resulted in the surrender of the rebel ram Tennessee and in the damaging and destruction of batteries at Fort Morgan.

== See also ==
- List of American Civil War Medal of Honor recipients: M–P
