= William McKnight =

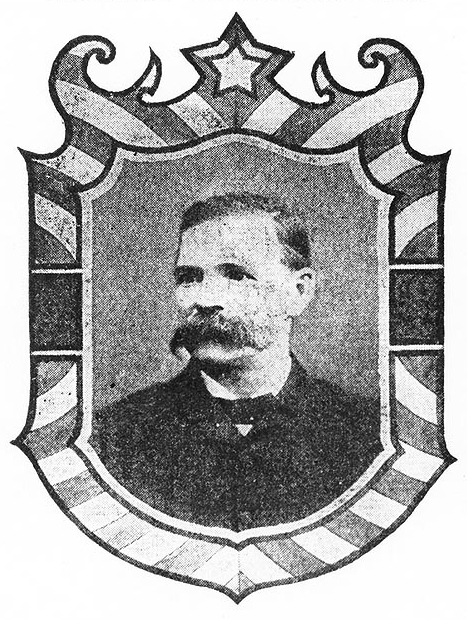
- Coxswain William McKnight
- Born: May 3, 1842; Ulster County, New York, US
- Died: November 4, 1914 (aged 72)
- Military career
- Allegiance: United States of America; Union
- Branch: United States Navy; Union Navy
- Rank: Master's mate
- Unit: USS Varuna
- Conflicts: American Civil War; *Battle of Forts Jackson and St. Philip
- Awards: Medal of Honor

William McKnight (May 3, 1842 – November 4, 1914) was a United States Navy sailor and a recipient of America's highest military decoration—the Medal of Honor—for his actions in the American Civil War.

== Early life ==
William Henry McKnight was born on May 3, 1842, in Ulster County, New York.

== Wartime Service ==
During the Civil War, William McKnight served in the U.S. Navy as a Coxswain. On April 24, 1862, as a gun captain on board USS Varuna (1861), he participated in combat against Confederate ships as the Federal fleet fought its way past the fortifications protecting the approaches to New Orleans, Louisiana. For his conduct during this event, Coxswain McKnight was awarded the Medal of Honor.

== Medal of Honor citation ==

Rank and Organization:

Coxswain, U.S. Navy. Born: 1842 Ulster County, N.Y. Accredited to: New York. G.O. No.: 11, 3 April 1863.

Citation:

Captain of a gun on board the U.S.S. Varuna during the attacks on Forts Jackson and St. Philip and in action against the rebel ship CSS Governor Moore, 24 April 1862. During this action at extremely close range, while his ship was under furious fire and was twice rammed by the rebel ship Morgan, McKnight remained steadfast at his gun throughout the thickest of the fight and was instrumental in inflicting damage on the enemy until the Varuna, so badly damaged that she was forced to beach, was finally sunk.

== See also ==
- List of American Civil War Medal of Honor recipients: M–P
