= William Magee (Medal of Honor) =

American Civil War Medal of Honor recipient

- Born: Newark, New Jersey
- Military career
- Allegiance: United States of America
- Branch: United States Army
- Rank: Drummer
- Units: Company C, 33rd New Jersey Volunteer Infantry
- Conflicts: American Civil War
- Awards: Medal of Honor

William Magee was a Drummer in the United States Army and a Medal of Honor recipient for his role in the American Civil War. Magee was the youngest person from the state of New Jersey to have ever earned the Medal of Honor.

At the time of Magee's enlistment in the United States Army, he was about the age of only 14 years. He left behind his family in Newark to fight and serve in the American Civil War as a drummer.

== Medal of Honor citation ==
Rank and organization: Drummer, Company C, 33d New Jersey Infantry. Place and date: At Murfreesboro, Tenn., December 5, 1864. Entered service at:------. Birth: Newark, N.J. Date of issue: February 7, 1866.

Citation:

In a charge, was among the first to reach a battery of the enemy and, with one or two others, mounted the artillery horses and took two guns into the Union lines.

== See also ==
- List of Medal of Honor recipients
- List of American Civil War Medal of Honor recipients: M–P
