= Llewellyn P. Norton =

United States Army Medal of Honor recipient

Llewellyn Powell Norton
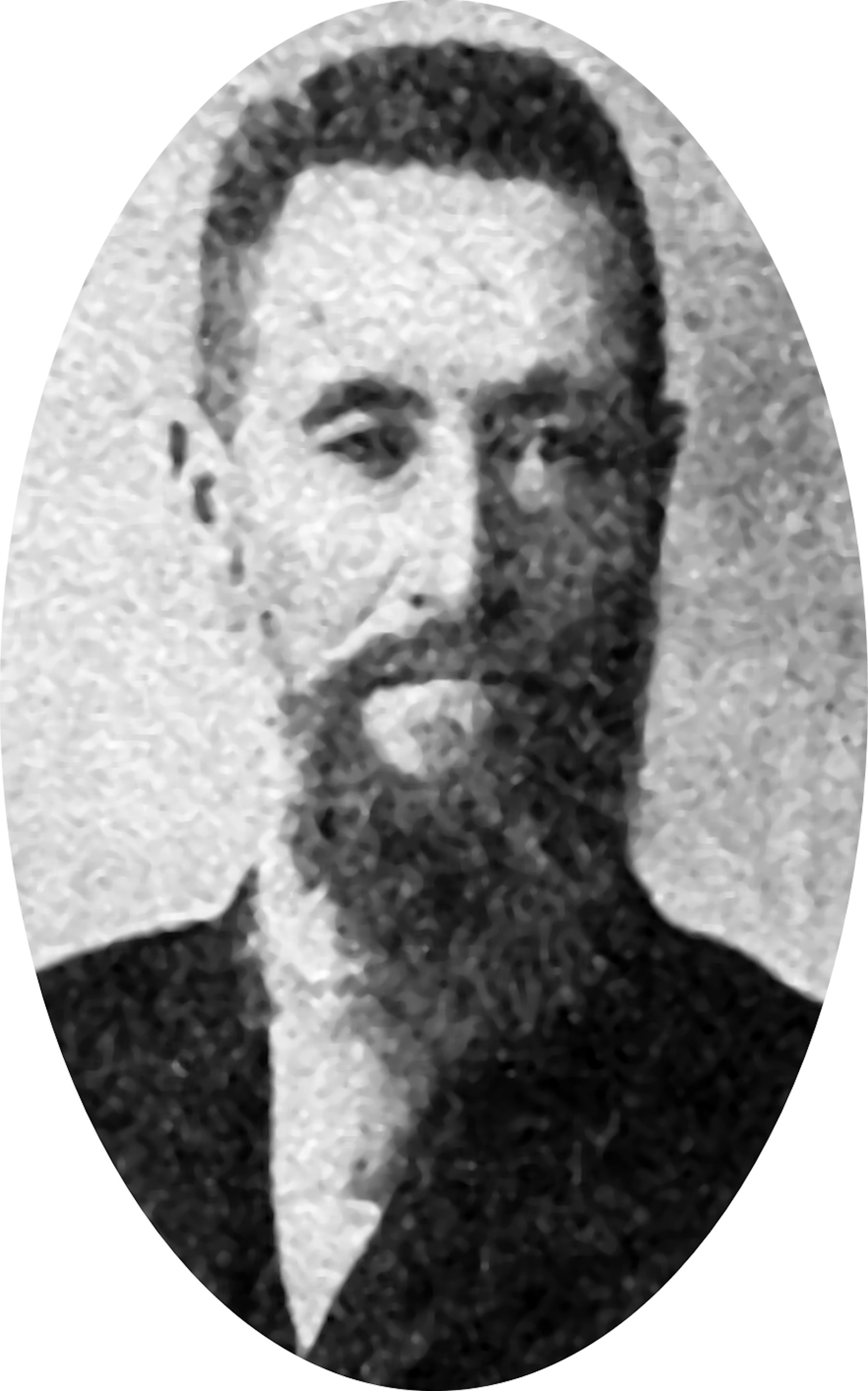
- Portrait of Norton
- Born: May 11, 1837; Scott, New York, U.S.
- Died: February 16, 1914 (aged 76); Homer, New York, U.S.
- Burial place: Elmwood Cemetery, Preble, New York, US
- Military career
- Allegiance: United States
- Branch: United States Army; Union Army
- Service years: 1863–1865 (Army)
- Rank: Sergeant
- Units: Company L, 10th New York Cavalry
- Conflicts: American Civil War
- Awards: Medal of Honor

Llewellyn Powell Norton (May 11, 1837 – February 16, 1914) was an American soldier who received the Medal of Honor for valor during the Battle of Sailor's Creek amidst the American Civil War.

== Medal of Honor citation ==
Citation:

Charged the enemy and, with the assistance of Cpl. Andrew Bringle, captured a fieldpiece with two prisoners.
