= Delano Morey =

American private in the Union Army

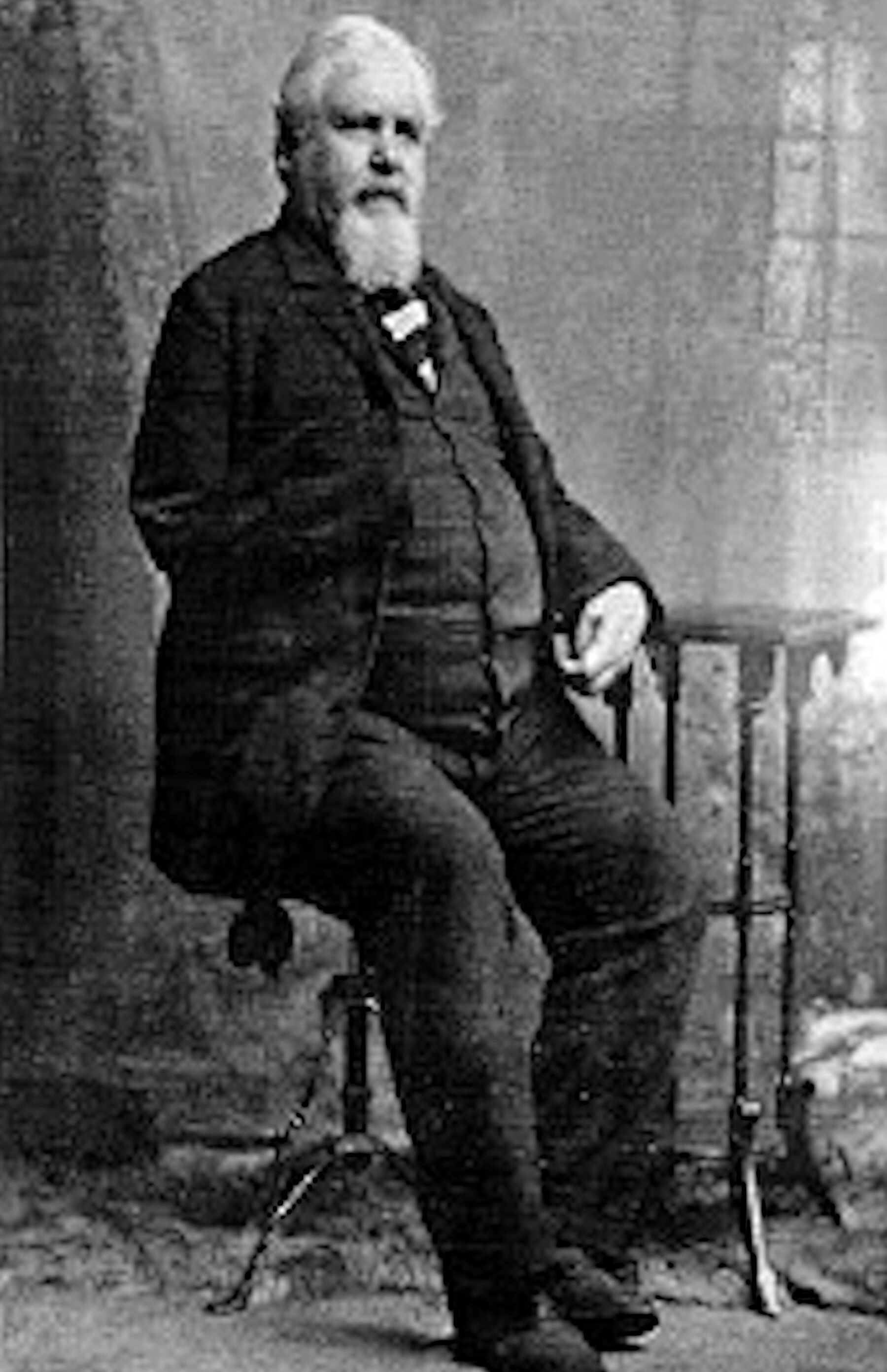
- Morey in 1910
- Born: July 14, 1845; Licking County, Ohio, U.S.
- Died: April 24, 1911 (aged 65) Kenton, Ohio, U.S.
- Branch: Union Army
- Rank: Private
- Conflicts: American Civil War
- Awards: Medal of Honor

Delano Morey (July 14, 1845 – April 24, 1911) was an American private in the Union Army. He received the Medal of Honor in 1893, for his actions on May 8, 1862 in the Battle of McDowell during the American Civil War.

Morey died in Kenton, Ohio on April 24, 1911, at the age of 65. He was buried at Grove Cemetery.
