= Joseph R. Prentice =

Joseph Rollin Prentice
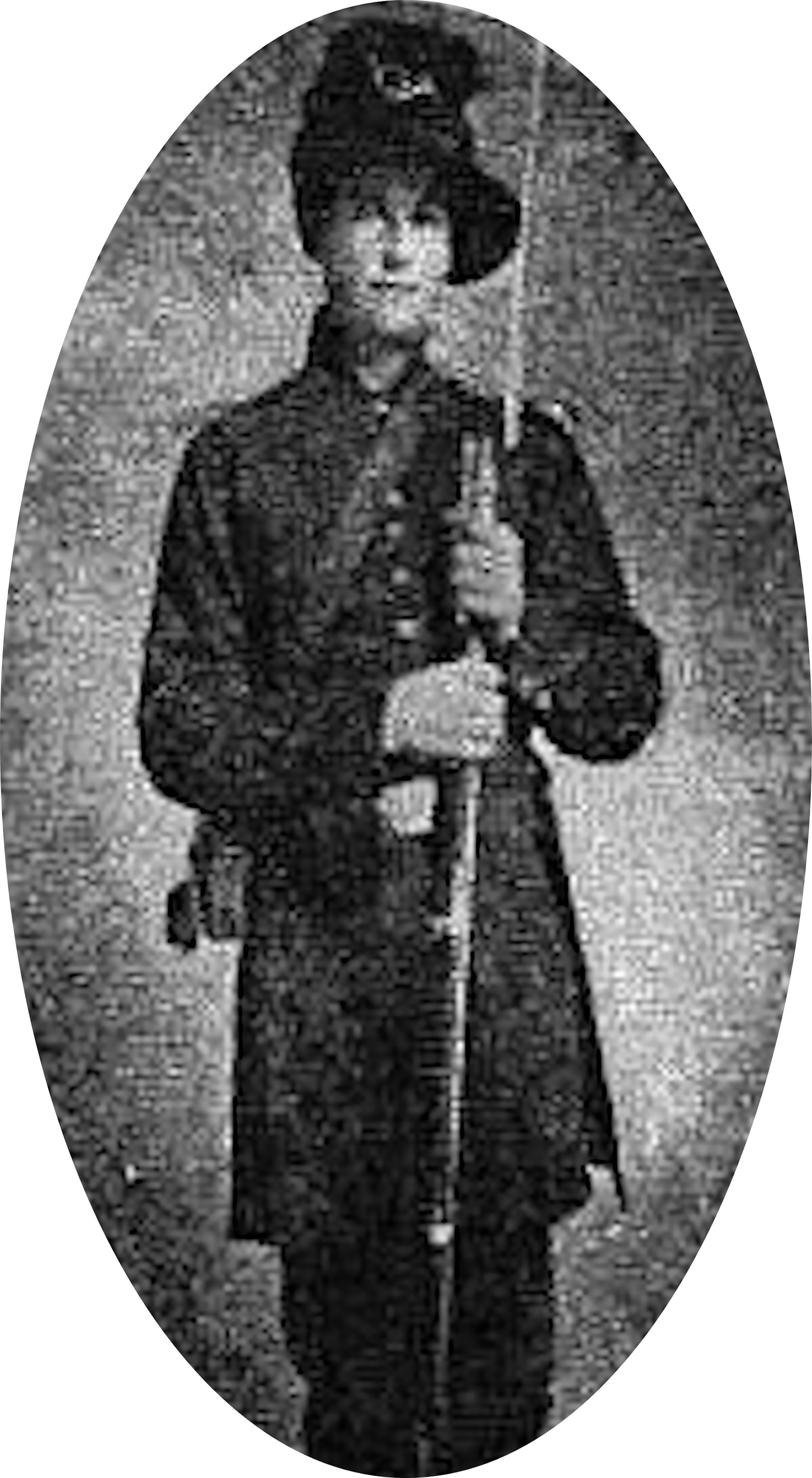
- Joseph R. Prentice in 1865
- Born: December 6, 1838; Lancaster, Ohio
- Died: August 7, 1908 (aged 69); Colorado Springs, Colorado
- Military career
- Branch: Union Army
- Service years: 1862-1864
- Rank: Private
- Units: Company E, 19th U.S. Infantry
- Conflicts: American Civil War; Battle of Stones River; Atlanta Campaign
- Awards: Medal of Honor

Joseph Rollin Prentice (December 6, 1838 - August 7, 1908) was a Union soldier who was awarded the Medal of Honor for transporting a mortally wounded officer to Union lines while under enemy fire.

== Biography ==
Joseph was born in Lancaster, Ohio to John Roland Harris Prentice (1815–1896) and Martha Elizabeth Eyanson (1819–1873). Joseph worked as a farmer in Ohio until 1862, when he enlisted in the Union Army and was placed in Company E of the 19th U.S. Infantry Regiment. On December 31, 1862, during the Battle of Stones River, Joseph's commanding officer was mortally wounded during the battle and escorted back to Union lines by Joseph under heavy enemy fire. On May 30, 1864, Joseph was wounded during the Atlanta Campaign and was dismissed. On February 3, 1894, Joseph was awarded with the Medal of Honor at Fort Wayne, Indiana. Joseph died on August 7, 1908, in Colorado Springs.
