= John N. Opel =

- Nicolaus Opel
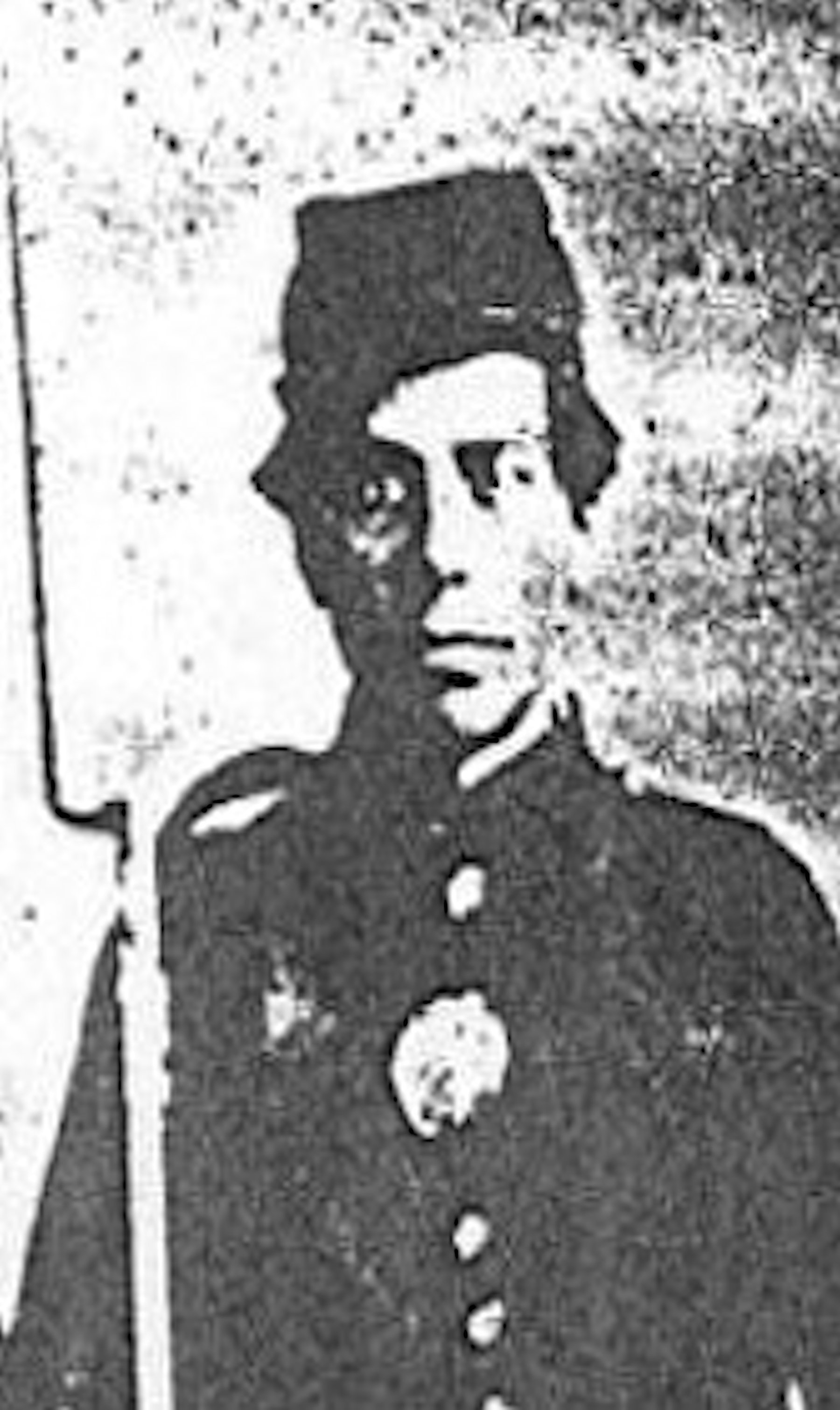
- Opel in the Union Army (1860s)
- Born: July 30, 1843; Hoflas, Bavaria, Germany
- Died: February 21, 1925 (aged 81); Cora, Missouri, United States
- Burial place: Mount Zion Cemetery, Milan, Missouri
- Military career
- Service years: 1861-1865
- Rank: Private
- Units: Company G, 7th Indiana Infantry Regiment
- Conflicts: American Civil War; Battle of the Wilderness
- Awards: Medal of Honor

John Nicholas Opel (July 30, 1843 – February 21, 1925) was a German-American Union soldier who captured the flag of 50th Virginia Infantry Regiment during the Battle of the Wilderness on May 5, 1864.

== Biography ==
Opel was born in Bavaria in 1843 to Johann Wolfgang Opel (1794–1879) and Anna Kunigunda Fischer (1809–1887) and immigrated to America aboard the Sir Isaac Newton on January 23, 1854, when he was 10-years-old.

Opel enlisted in the Union Army, aged 17/18-years-old and was placed in Company G of the 7th Indiana Infantry Regiment. On May 5, 1864, during the Battle of the Wilderness, Opel captured the flag from the 50th Virginia Infantry Regiment and transported it to Union lines.

Following his service, Opel married Phoebe Ann Sloan (1845–1932) on March 20, 1867, in Indiana and had 6 children with her: Bertha Florence (1868–1944), Laura Jane (1871–1956), Anna Bethsina (1875–1957), Effa P. (1877–1972), Benjamin Lewis (1883–1961), Mary Caroline (1887–1979). Opel was died in Missouri in 1925, aged 81.
