= Stephen O'Neill (Medal of Honor) =

Canadian-born American corporal in the Union Army

- O'Neill in 1875
- Born: December 23, 1837; Saint John, New Brunswick, Canada
- Died: October 20, 1909 (aged 71); Michigan, U.S.
- Military career
- Branch: Union Army
- Rank: Corporal
- Conflicts: American Civil War
- Awards: Medal of Honor

Stephen O'Neill (December 23, 1837 – October 20, 1909) was a Canadian-born American corporal in the Union Army. He received the Medal of Honor in 1891, for his actions on May 1, 1863 in the Battle of Chancellorsville during the American Civil War.

O'Neill died in Michigan on October 20, 1909, at the age of 71.
