= 147th Illinois Infantry Regiment =

147th Regiment Illinois Volunteer Infantry
- Illinois state flag
- Active: February 18, 1865, to January 20, 1866
- Country: United States
- Allegiance: Union
- Branch: Infantry

The 147th Regiment Illinois Volunteer Infantry was an infantry regiment that served in the Union Army during the American Civil War.

== Service ==
The 147th Illinois Infantry was organized at Chicago, Illinois, and mustered into Federal service on February 18, 1865, for a one-year enlistment. The 147th served in garrisons and operated against guerillas in Georgia.

The regiment was mustered out of service on January 20, 1866.

== Total strength and casualties ==
The regiment suffered 3 enlisted men killed in action or mortally wounded, and 31 enlisted men who died of disease for a total of 34 fatalities.

== Commanders ==
- Colonel Hiram Franklin Sickles - mustered out with the regiment.

== See also ==
- List of Illinois Civil War Units
- Illinois in the American Civil War
