= Menomen O'Donnell =

American Civil War Medal of Honor recipient

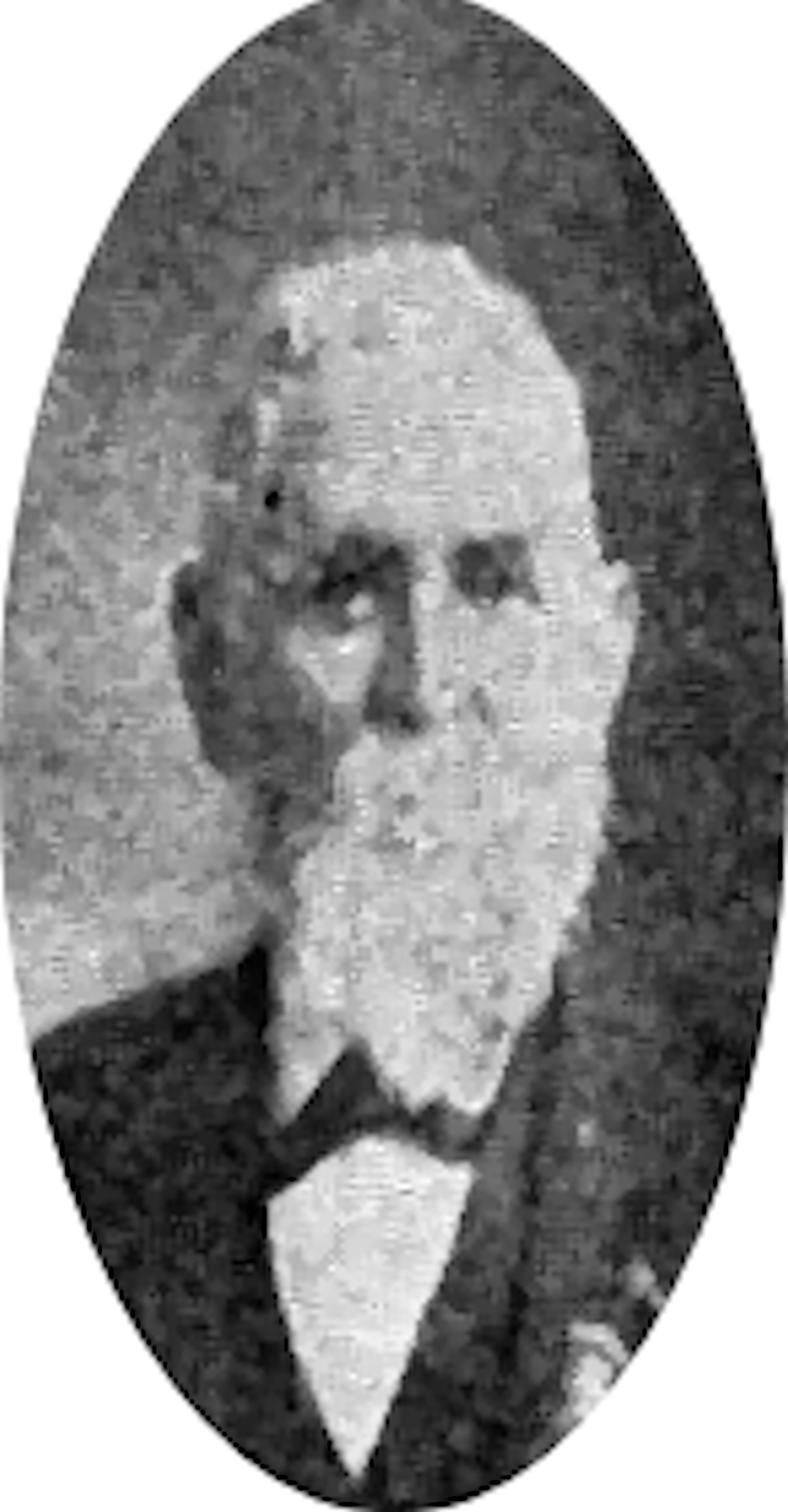
- O'Donnell in 1900
- Born: April 20, 1830; Donegal, Ireland
- Died: September 3, 1911 (aged 81); Vincennes, Indiana
- Military career
- Rank: Captain
- Units: Company A, 11th Missouri Volunteer Infantry
- Conflicts: American Civil War
- Awards: Medal of Honor

Menomen O'Donnell (April 20, 1830 – September 3, 1911) was an Irish American soldier and member of the 11th Missouri Volunteer Infantry who fought in the American Civil War and was awarded the Medal of Honor for placing his division's flag on the ramparts of an enemy fort during a battle in which he was injured twice.
