= Noble D. Preston =

Noble Delance Preston
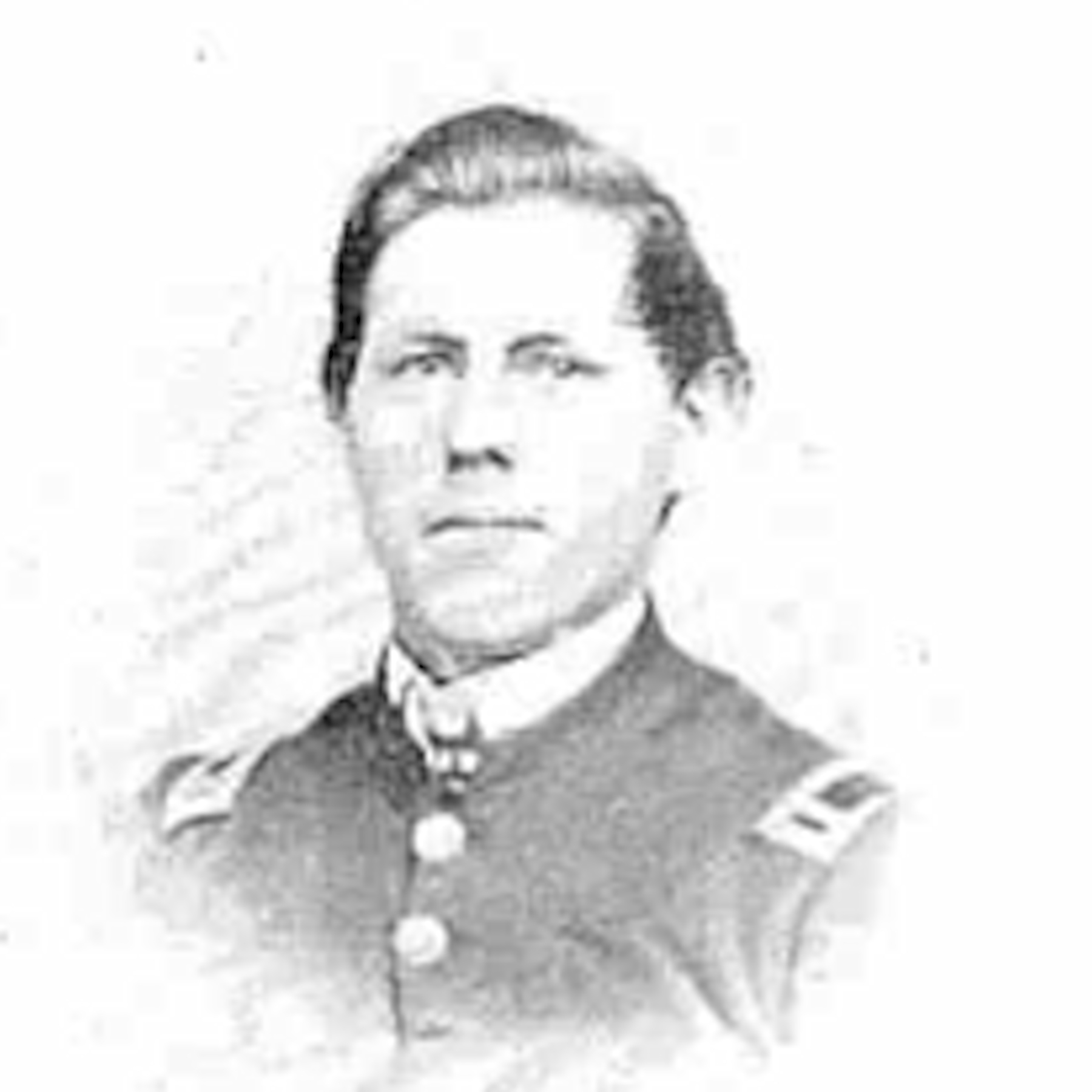
- Medal of Honor winner Noble Delance Preston
- Born: February 2, 1842; Madison County, New York, US
- Died: December 29, 1919 (aged 77); Philadelphia, Pennsylvania, US
- Burial place: Chelton Hills Cemetery, Philadelphia
- Military career
- Allegiance: United States (Union)
- Branch: U.S. Army (Union Army)
- Service years: August 30, 1861–November 28,1864
- Rank: Brevet lieutenant colonel
- Nickname: Fighting Commisary
- Units: Company A, 10th New York Cavalry Regiment
- Conflicts: American Civil War: Battle of Fredericksburg; Battle of Gettysburg; Battle of Trevilian Station; Siege of Petersburg
- Awards: Medal of Honor

Noble Delance Preston (1842-1919) was an American military officer who received the Medal of Honor. He wrote History of the Tenth Regiment of Cavalry New York State Volunteers about the 10th New York Cavalry Regiment he served with.

== Biography ==
Noble Delance Preston was born in Madison County, New York on February 2, 1842.

=== Civil War ===
On August 30, 1861, following the outbreak of the American Civil War, he enlisted in the Union Army as a corporal and was mustered into Company A, 10th New York Calvary on September 27, 1861 as a sergeant. On November 25, 1861 he was promoted to sergeant major. He was commissioned as a first lieutenant on September 15, 1862. On June 11, 1864 he was promoted to the rank of captain and placed in command of Company A.

During his service with the Union Army he saw action at Fredericksburg, Gettysburg, Trevillian Station and the Siege of Petersburg. He was discharged at Annapolis, Maryland, on account of wounds received in action, on November 28, 1864. He later received brevets (honorary promotions) to major and lieutenant colonel for his service during the Civil War.

=== Post war ===
He married to Anna H. Sanford.

On November 22, 1889, Preston was presented the Medal of Honor for heroism at the Battle of Trevilian Station, Virginia on June 11, 1864. His Medal of Honor citation reads: "For voluntarily leading a charge, in which he was severely wounded."

In 1892 he wrote History of the Tenth Regiment of Cavalry New York State Volunteers.

On October 10, 1894, Preston was elected as a Veteran Companion of the Pennsylvania Commandery of the Military Order of the Loyal Legion of the United States (MOLLUS). He was assigned MOLLUS insignia number 10,632.

=== Death and burial ===
He died on December 29, 1919 in Philadelphia, Pennsylvania. He is buried in Chelton Hills Cemetery in Philadelphia.
