= William Martin (American sailor, USS Varuna) =

- Born: c. 1839; Ireland
- Military career
- Allegiance: United States
- Branch: United States Navy
- Rank: Seaman
- Unit: (United States Navy) USS Varuna
- Conflicts: American Civil War • Battle of Forts Jackson and St. Philip
- Awards: Medal of Honor

William Martin (born c. 1839; date of death unknown) was a Union Navy sailor in the American Civil War and a recipient of the U.S. military's highest decoration, the Medal of Honor, for his actions at the Battle of Forts Jackson and St. Philip.

Born in 1839 in Ireland, Martin immigrated to the United States and was living in New York when he joined the U.S. Navy. He served during the Civil War as a seaman on the USS Varuna. At the Battle of Forts Jackson and St. Philip near New Orleans on April 24, 1862, Varuna was rammed twice by the Confederate steamer CSS Governor Moore (formerly known as the Charles Morgan) and eventually sunk. Martin acted as a gun captain and was "cool and courageous" throughout the close-range fight. For this action, he was awarded the Medal of Honor a year later, on April 3, 1863.

Martin's official Medal of Honor citation reads:

The President of the United States of America, in the name of Congress, takes pleasure in presenting the Medal of Honor to Seaman William Martin, United States Navy, for extraordinary heroism in action, serving as Captain of a gun on board the U.S.S. Varuna during an attack on Forts Jackson and St. Philip, Louisiana, 24 April 1862. His ship was taken under furious fire by the rebel Morgan and severely damaged by ramming. Steadfast at his station through the thickest of the fight, Seaman Martin inflicted damage on the enemy, remaining cool and courageous although the Varuna, so badly damaged that she was forced to beach, was finally sunk.

== See also ==
- List of American Civil War Medal of Honor recipients
- USS Varuna
- Battle of Forts Jackson and St. Philip

== Bibliography ==
- "William Martin". Congressional Medal of Honor Society. Congressional Medal of Honor Society. February 22, 2022.
- "William Martin". The Wall of Valor Project. Wall of Valor: The Military Medals Database. August 8, 2020.
- "William Martin". Medal of Honor Recipients. The Comprehensive Guide to the Victoria & George Cross. December 15, 2015.
