= Alexander Mack (Medal of Honor) =

American Civil War Medal of Honor recipient

- Born: May 17, 1834; Rotterdam
- Died: September 25, 1907 (aged 73)
- Military career
- Allegiance: United States; Union
- Branch: United States Navy; Union Navy
- Rank: Chief Boatswain
- Unit: (United States Navy) USS Brooklyn
- Conflicts: American Civil War
- Awards: Medal of Honor

Alexander Mack (1834–1907) was a sailor in the United States Navy and a Medal of Honor recipient for his role in the American Civil War.

Mack is buried in Saint Patricks Cemetery, Fall River, Massachusetts.

== Medal of Honor citation ==
Rank and organization: Captain of the Top, United States Navy.
Born: 1836, Holland. Accredited to: New York.
G.O. No.: 45, December 31, 1864.

Citation:

On board the U.S.S. Brooklyn during successful attacks against Fort Morgan, rebel gunboats and the ram Tennessee in Mobile Bay, on August 5, 1864. Although wounded and sent below for treatment, Mack immediately returned to his post and took charge of his gun and, as heavy enemy return fire continued to fall, performed his duties with skill and courage until he was again wounded and totally disabled.

== See also ==
- List of American Civil War Medal of Honor recipients: M–P
