= Owen McGough =

Irish-American Union soldier

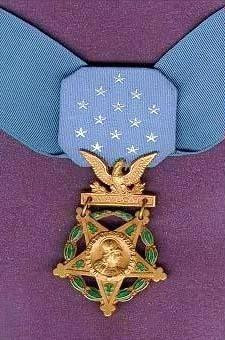
- Born: June 29, 1829; Monaghan, Ireland
- Died: January 5, 1908 (aged 78); Troy, New York, United States
- Burial place: St Peter's Cemetery, Troy, New York
- Spouse: Catherine Dungan
- Children: 3
- Military career
- Allegiance: Union
- Branch: Army
- Service years: 1859-1861
- Rank: Corporal
- Units: Battery D, 5th U.S. Artillery
- Conflicts: American Civil War; First Battle of Bull Run
- Awards: Medal of Honor

Owen McGough (June 29, 1829 - January 5, 1908) was an Irish-American Union army corporal who was awarded the Medal of Honor for his actions at the First Battle of Bull Run on July 21, 1861. He received the award on August 28, 1897.

== Biography ==
Born in Monaghan, Ireland, in 1829, to Peter McGough (1804 - December 23, 1865) and Judy McGough (1802-after 1850) McGough immigrated to America on April 23, 1849, aboard the German ship, Mauran, and settled in New Orleans, Louisiana on May 24, 1859, he enlisted in the Army and was discharged sometime prior to 1861.

On May 1, 1861, he enlisted to fight in the Union Army at Cornwall, New York, and was mustered out the same day. He became a corporal and fought in Company D, of the 5th U.S. Artillery, at the First Battle of Bull Run on July 21, 1861, McGough "Through his personal exertions under a heavy fire, one of the guns of his battery was brought off the field; all the other guns were lost."

He was discharged shortly afterwards and married Catherine Dungan (1835–1872) and had three sons with her: Patrick (1863-after 1880), Eugene Owen (February 2, 1865 - 1953), and John (1872-after 1880). He and his family settled in Troy, New York, and McGough began to work as a common laborer in the 1870s and a vegetable peddler in the 1880s. and received the Medal of Honor on August 28, 1897, and Owen McGough died on January 5, 1908.
