= Oscar E. Peck =

- Born: 1848; Bridgeport, Connecticut
- Died: October 23, 1906 (aged 57–58)
- Burial place: Spring Grove Cemetery, Darien, Connecticut
- Military career
- Allegiance: United States
- Branch: United States Navy
- Rank: Second Class Boy
- Unit: USS Varuna
- Conflicts: American Civil War • Battle of Forts Jackson and St. Philip
- Awards: Medal of Honor

Oscar E. Peck (1848 – October 23, 1906) was a Union Navy sailor in the American Civil War and a recipient of the U.S. military's highest decoration, the Medal of Honor, for his actions at the Battle of Forts Jackson and St. Philip.

Born in 1848 in Bridgeport, Connecticut, Peck was still living in that city when he joined the Navy. He served during the Civil War as a second class boy on the USS Varuna. At the Battle of Forts Jackson and St. Philip near New Orleans on April 24, 1862, Varuna was rammed twice by the Confederate steamer CSS Governor Moore (formerly known as the Charles Morgan) and eventually sunk. Peck acted as a powder boy and "served gallantly" throughout the close-range fight. For this action, he was awarded the Medal of Honor a year later, on April 3, 1863.

Peck's official Medal of Honor citation reads:

Peck served as second-class boy on board the Varuna during an attack on Forts Jackson and St. Philip, 24 April 1862. Acting as powder boy of the after rifle, Peck served gallantly while the Varuna was repeatedly attacked and rammed and finally sunk. This was an extremely close-range action and, although badly damaged, the Varuna delivered shells abaft the Morgan's armor.

Peck died on October 23, 1906, at age 57 or 58 and was buried at Spring Grove Cemetery in Darien, Connecticut.
