= James B. Chandler =

American military officer (1837–1899)

- Civil War era Navy Medal of Honor
- Born: October 6, 1837; Plymouth, Massachusetts
- Died: July 12, 1899 (aged 61)
- Burial place: Plymouth, Massachusetts
- Military career
- Allegiance: United States
- Branch: United States Navy
- Service years: 1861 - 1864
- Rank: Coxswain
- Unit: USS Richmond
- Conflicts: American Civil War • Battle of Forts Jackson and St. Philip • Battle of Mobile Bay
- Awards: Medal of Honor

James B. Chandler (October 6, 1837 – July 12, 1899) was a Union Navy sailor in the American Civil War and a recipient of the U.S. military's highest decoration, the Medal of Honor, for his actions at the Battle of Mobile Bay.

Chandler was born on October 6, 1837, in Plymouth, Massachusetts. Joined the Navy from Boston in November 1861 for 3 years, and served during the Civil War as a coxswain on the USS Richmond. In the April 1862 Battle of Forts Jackson and St. Philip, Richmond fought Confederate ships in the Mississippi and passed artillery batteries at Chalmette, Louisiana, leading to the capture of New Orleans. The ship then proceeded up the river and Chandler participated in the passage of Vicksburg, Mississippi, in mid-1862. Although recovering from illness, he "rendered gallant service" through heavy fire at the Battle of Mobile Bay on August 5, 1864. For this action, he was awarded the Medal of Honor four months later, on December 31, 1864.

Chandler's official Medal of Honor citation reads:

On board the U.S.S. Richmond during action against rebel forts and gunboats and with the ram Tennessee in Mobile Bay, 5 August 1864. Cool and courageous although he had just come off the sick list, Chandler rendered gallant service throughout the prolonged action as his ship maintained accurate fire against Fort Morgan and ships of the Confederacy despite extremely heavy return fire. He participated in the actions at Forts Jackson and St. Philip, with the Chalmette batteries, at the surrender of New Orleans and in the attacks on batteries below Vicksburg.

Chandler died on July 12, 1899, at age 61 and was buried in his birth city of Plymouth, Massachusetts.
