= James Smith (Medal of Honor, 1864) =

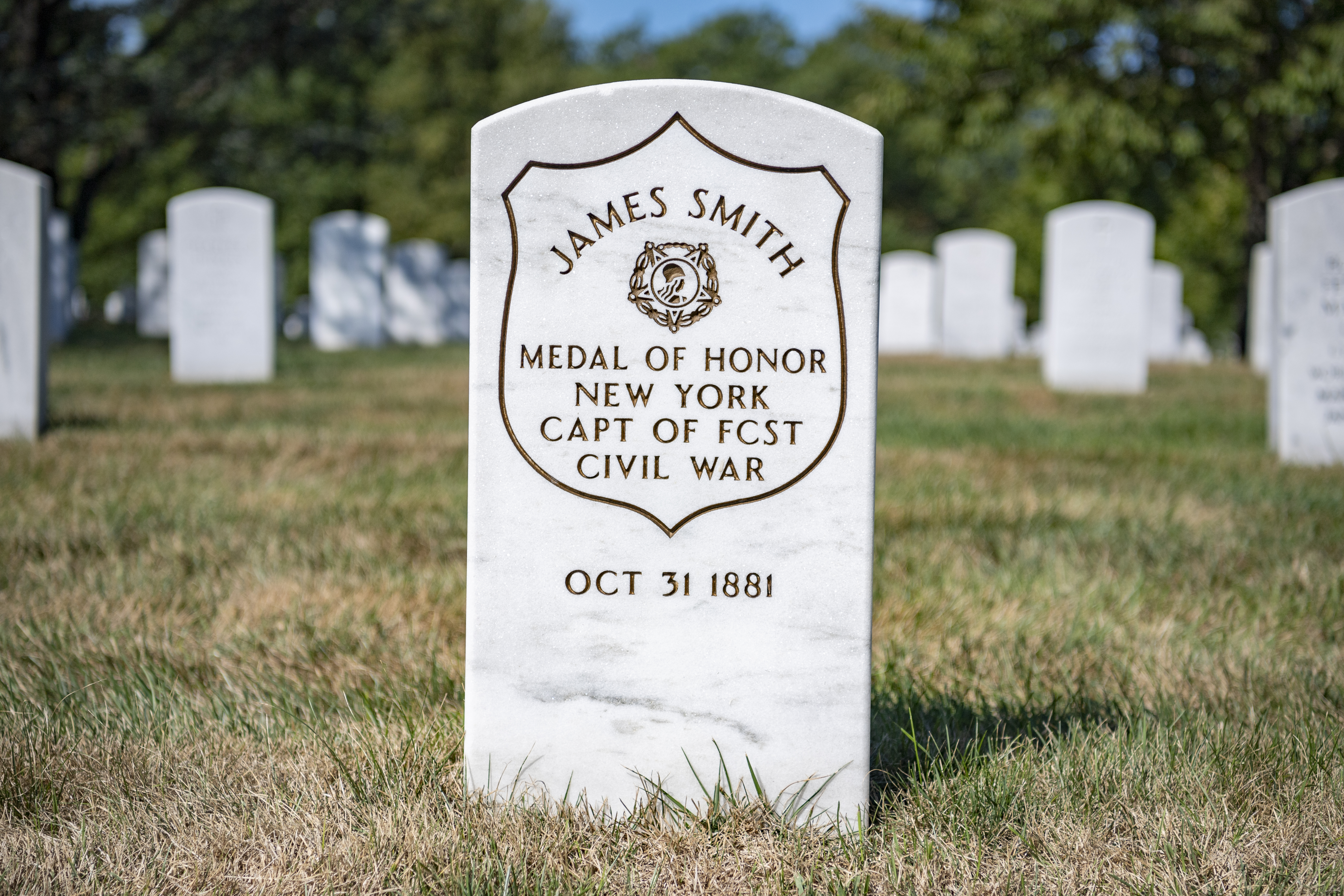
- Grave at Arlington National Cemetery
- Born: c. 1826; Belfast, Ireland
- Died: October 31, 1881 (aged 54–55)
- Burial place: Arlington National Cemetery
- Military career
- Allegiance: United States
- Branch: United States Navy
- Rank: Captain of the Forecastle
- Unit: USS Richmond
- Conflicts: American Civil War • Battle of Mobile Bay
- Awards: Medal of Honor

James Smith (c. 1826 – October 31, 1881) was a Union Navy sailor in the American Civil War and a recipient of the U.S. military's highest decoration, the Medal of Honor, for his actions at the Battle of Mobile Bay.

Born in about 1826 in Belfast, Ireland, Smith immigrated to the United States and was living in New York when he joined the U.S. Navy. He served during the Civil War as a captain of the forecastle and gun captain on the USS Richmond. At the Battle of Mobile Bay on August 5, 1864, he "fought his gun with skill and courage" despite heavy fire. For this action, he was awarded the Medal of Honor four months later, on December 31, 1864.

Smith's official Medal of Honor citation reads:

As captain of a gun on board the U.S.S. Richmond during action against rebel forts and gunboats and with the ram Tennessee, in Mobile Bay, 5 August 1864. Despite damage to his ship and the loss of several men on board as enemy fire raked her decks, Smith fought his gun with skill and courage throughout the prolonged battle which resulted in the surrender of the rebel ram Tennessee and in the successful attacks carried out on Fort Morgan.

Smith was married at St. James' Church, Manhattan, in May 1870 and had three children. He died on October 31, 1881, at age 54 or 55 and was buried in an unmarked pauper's grave in Calvary Cemetery, New York City.

In the 1980s, one of his great-grandsons began an effort to have a marker placed on Smith's grave. Because other bodies had been buried in the same location, cemetery officials would allow neither the grave to be marked nor Smith's remains to be moved. The dispute culminated in an October 2, 1985, ruling by the New York Supreme Court which ordered that Smith's body be disinterred for reburial in Arlington National Cemetery, Virginia. His remains were interred at Arlington on May 30, 1986, following services at Manhattan's St. James' Church, where Smith was married 116 years earlier, and a ceremony at the Lincoln Memorial.
