= William M. Carr =

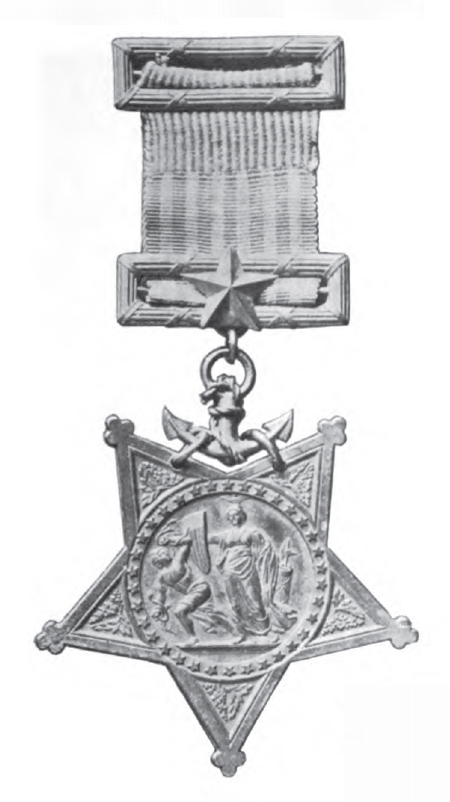
- Carr's Medal of Honor
- Born: November 25, 1829; Baltimore, Maryland
- Died: May 2, 1884 (aged 54)
- Burial place: Norfolk, Virginia
- Military career
- Allegiance: United States
- Branch: United States Navy
- Service years: 1850 - 1870
- Rank: Master-at-Arms
- Unit: USS Richmond
- Conflicts: American Civil War • Battle of Mobile Bay
- Awards: Medal of Honor

William M. Carr (November 25, 1829 – May 2, 1884) was a Union Navy sailor in the American Civil War and a recipient of the U.S. military's highest decoration, the Medal of Honor, for his actions at the Battle of Mobile Bay.

Born on November 25, 1829, in Baltimore, Maryland, Carr was living in that city when he joined the Navy in 1850. He served during the Civil War as a Master-at-Arms on the USS Richmond. At the Battle of Mobile Bay on August 5, 1864, he "performed his duties with skill and courage" despite heavy fire. For this action, he was awarded the Medal of Honor four months later, on December 31, 1864.

Carr's official Medal of Honor citation reads:

On board the U.S.S. Richmond during action against rebel forts and gunboats and with the ram Tennessee in Mobile Bay, 5 August 1864. Despite damage to his ship and the loss of several men on board as enemy fire raked her decks, Carr performed his duties with skill and courage throughout the prolonged battle which resulted in the surrender of the rebel ram Tennessee and in the successful attacks carried out on Fort Morgan.

Carr died on May 2, 1884, at age 54 and was buried in Norfolk, Virginia. His Medal of Honor is held by the American Numismatic Society.
