= Oloff Smith =

- Born: c. 1833; Sweden
- Military career
- Allegiance: United States
- Branch: United States Navy
- Rank: Coxswain
- Unit: USS Richmond
- Conflicts: American Civil War • Battle of Mobile Bay
- Awards: Medal of Honor

Oloff Smith (born c. 1833, date of death unknown) was a Union Navy sailor in the American Civil War and a recipient of the U.S. military's highest decoration, the Medal of Honor, for his actions at the Battle of Mobile Bay.

Born in about 1833 in Sweden, Smith immigrated to the United States and was living in New York City when he joined the U.S. Navy. He served in the Civil War as a coxswain on the USS Richmond. During the Battle of Mobile Bay on August 5, 1864, he "performed his duties with skill and courage" despite heavy fire. For this action, he was awarded the Medal of Honor four months later, on December 31, 1864.

Smith's official Medal of Honor citation reads:

On board the U.S.S. Richmond during action against rebel forts and gunboats and with the ram Tennessee in Mobile Bay, 5 August 1864. Despite damage to his ship and the loss of several men on board as enemy fire raked her decks, Smith performed his duties with skill and courage throughout the furious 2-hour battle which resulted in the surrender of the rebel ram Tennessee and in the damaging and destruction of batteries at Fort Morgan.
