= Adam Duncan (sailor) =

Union Navy sailor in the American Civil War

- Born: c. 1833; Sullivan, Maine
- Military career
- Allegiance: United States
- Branch: United States Navy
- Service years: 1859–1864
- Rank: Boatswain's Mate
- Unit: USS Richmond
- Conflicts: American Civil War • Battle of Mobile Bay
- Awards: Medal of Honor

Adam Duncan (born c. 1833, date of death unknown) was a Union Navy sailor in the American Civil War and a recipient of the U.S. military's highest decoration, the Medal of Honor, for his actions at the Battle of Mobile Bay.

Duncan was born in 1833 in Sullivan, Maine, and joined the Navy from Boston. He served during the Civil War as a boatswain's mate and gun captain on the USS Richmond. At the Battle of Mobile Bay on August 5, 1864, he "fought his gun with skill and courage" despite heavy fire. For this action, he was awarded the Medal of Honor four months later, on December 31, 1864. Duncan was discharged in November 1864, having served a total of six years in the Navy.

Duncan's official Medal of Honor citation reads:

As captain of a gun on board the U.S.S. Richmond during action against rebel forts and gunboats and with the ram Tennessee in Mobile Bay, 5 August 1864. Despite damage to his ship and the loss of several men on board as enemy fire raked her decks, Duncan fought his gun with skill and courage throughout the prolonged battle which resulted in the surrender of the rebel ram Tennessee and in the successful attacks carried out on Fort Morgan.
