= John Smith (Medal of Honor, born 1826) =

Union Navy sailor

- Born: February 17, 1826; Albany, New York
- Died: December 31, 1907 (aged 81); Philadelphia, Pennsylvania
- Burial place: Mount Moriah Cemetery, Philadelphia, Pennsylvania
- Military career
- Allegiance: United States
- Branch: United States Navy
- Service years: 1851 - 1882
- Rank: Second Captain of the Top
- Unit: USS Richmond
- Conflicts: American Civil War • Battle of Mobile Bay
- Awards: Medal of Honor

John Smith (February 17, 1826 – December 31, 1907) was a Union Navy sailor in the American Civil War and a recipient of the U.S. military's highest decoration, the Medal of Honor, for his actions at the Battle of Mobile Bay.

Born in Albany, New York, Smith joined the Navy in September 1851. By August 5, 1864, he was serving as a second captain of the top and gun captain on the USS Richmond. On that day, during the Battle of Mobile Bay, Alabama, he continued to man his gun despite heavy fire. For this action, he was awarded the Medal of Honor four months later, on December 31, 1864. He was discharged in February 1882, and lived at the Philadelphia Naval Asylum until his death and is buried at Mount Moriah Cemetery of Philadelphia.

Smith's official Medal of Honor citation reads:

As captain of a gun on board the U.S.S. Richmond during action against rebel forts and gunboats and with the ram Tennessee in Mobile Bay, 5 August 1864. Despite damage to his ship and the loss of several men on board as enemy fire raked her decks, Smith fought his gun with skill and courage throughout a furious 2-hour battle which resulted in the surrender of the rebel ram Tennessee and in the damaging and destruction of batteries at Fort Morgan.
