= Alexander H. Truett =

- Born: July 4, 1833; Baltimore, Maryland, US
- Died: December 5, 1898; Philadelphia, Pennsylvania, US
- Military career
- Allegiance: United States
- Branch: United States Navy
- Rank: Coxswain
- Unit: USS Richmond
- Conflicts: American Civil War: Battle of Mobile Bay
- Awards: Medal of Honor

Alexander H. Truett (1833–1898) was a Union Navy sailor in the American Civil War and a recipient of the U.S. military's highest decoration, the Medal of Honor, for his actions at the Battle of Mobile Bay.

Born on July 4, 1833, in Baltimore, Maryland, Truett was still living in that city when he joined the Navy. He served during the Civil War as a coxswain on the USS Richmond. At the Battle of Mobile Bay on August 5, 1864, he "performed his duties with skill and courage" despite heavy fire. For this action, he was awarded the Medal of Honor four months later, on December 31, 1864.

Truett's official Medal of Honor citation reads:

On board the U.S.S. Richmond during action against rebel forts and gunboats and with the ram Tennessee in Mobile Bay, 5 August 1864. Despite damage to his ship and the loss of several men on board as enemy fire raked her decks, Truett performed his duties with skill and courage throughout a furious 2-hour battle which resulted in the surrender of the rebel ram Tennessee and in the damaging and destruction of batteries at Fort Morgan.

He died on December 5, 1898, and is interred at Mount Moriah Cemetery in Philadelphia, Pennsylvania.
