= Thomas Hayes (Medal of Honor) =

United States Navy Medal of Honor recipient

- Medal of Honor recipient
- Born: c. 1840; Rhode Island, US
- Died: May 24, 1914 (aged 73–74)
- Military career
- Allegiance: United States
- Branch: United States Navy
- Rank: Coxswain
- Unit: USS Richmond
- Conflicts: American Civil War; *Battle of Mobile Bay
- Awards: Medal of Honor

Thomas Hayes (c. 1840 – May 24, 1914) was a United States Navy sailor and a recipient of America's highest military decoration, the Medal of Honor, for his actions during the Battle of Mobile Bay in the American Civil War.

== Medal of Honor citation ==
Rank and Organization: Coxswain, U.S. Navy. Born: c. 1840, Rhode Island. Accredited To: Rhode Island. G.O. No.: 45, 31 December 1864.

Citation:

As Captain of No. 1 gun on board the USS Richmond during action against rebel forts and gunboats and with the CSS Tennessee in Mobile Bay, 5 August 1864. Cool and courageous at his station throughout the prolonged action, Hayes maintained fire from his gun on Fort Morgan and on ships of the Confederacy despite extremely heavy return fire.

Thomas Hayes died on 24 May 1914 in Newport, Rhode Island and is buried in St. Columba's Cemetery in Middletown, Rhode Island.

== See also ==
- List of Medal of Honor recipients
- Battle of Mobile Bay
- USS Richmond
