= William Doolen =

- Civil War era Navy Medal of Honor
- Born: March 4, 1825; County Kildare, Ireland
- Died: September 14, 1895 (aged 69–70)
- Burial place: Cheyenne, Wyoming
- Military career
- Allegiance: United States
- Branch: United States Navy
- Rank: Coal Heaver
- Unit: USS Richmond
- Conflicts: American Civil War • Battle of Mobile Bay
- Awards: Medal of Honor

William Doolen (March 4, 1825 – September 14, 1895) was a Union Navy sailor in the American Civil War and a recipient of the U.S. military's highest decoration, the Medal of Honor, for his actions at the Battle of Mobile Bay.

Born as 'William Dolan in March 4, 1825 in County Kildare, Ireland, Doolen immigrated to the United States and was living in Philadelphia, Pennsylvania, when he joined the U.S. Navy. He served during the Civil War as a coal heaver on the USS Richmond. At the Battle of Mobile Bay on August 5, 1864, he "rendered gallant service" despite heavy fire, even after receiving a serious wound to the head. For this action, he was awarded the Medal of Honor four months later, on December 31, 1864.

Doolen's official Medal of Honor citation reads:

On board the U.S.S. Richmond during action against rebel forts and gunboats and with the ram Tennessee in Mobile Bay, 5 August 1864. Although knocked down and seriously wounded in the head, Doolen refused to leave his station as shot and shell passed. Calm and courageous, he rendered gallant service throughout the prolonged battle which resulted in the surrender of the rebel ram Tennessee and in the successful attacks carried out on Fort Morgan despite the enemy's heavy return fire.

Doolen died on September 14, 1895, at age 71 and was buried in Cheyenne, Wyoming.
