= William Densmore =

- Civil War era Navy Medal of Honor
- Born: about 1833; New York, New York
- Died: June 17, 1865 (aged 31–32); Philadelphia Naval Asylum, Philadelphia, Pennsylvania
- Burial place: New Cathedral Cemetery, Philadelphia, Pennsylvania
- Military career
- Allegiance: United States of America; Union
- Branch: United States Navy; Union Navy
- Rank: Chief Boatswain's Mate
- Unit: USS Richmond
- Conflicts: American Civil War • Battle of Mobile Bay
- Awards: Medal of Honor

Chief Boatswain's Mate William Densmore (c. 1833 – June 17, 1865) was a Union Navy sailor in the American Civil War and a recipient of the U.S. military's highest decoration, the Medal of Honor, for his actions at the Battle of Mobile Bay.

== Military service ==
Born in about 1833 in New York, Densmore was still living in that state when he joined the Navy. He served during the Civil War as a chief boatswain's mate and gun captain on the USS Richmond. At the Battle of Mobile Bay on August 5, 1864, he "fought his gun with skill and courage" despite heavy fire. For this action, he was awarded the Medal of Honor four months later, on December 31, 1864.

== Medal of Honor citation ==
Rank and organization: Chief Boatswain's Mate, U.S. Navy. Accredited to: New York. G.O. No.: 45, 31 December 1864.

Densmore's official Medal of Honor citation reads:

As captain of a gun on board the U.S.S. Richmond during action against rebel forts and gunboats and with the ram Tennessee in Mobile Bay, 5 August 1864. Despite damage to his ship and the loss of several men on board as enemy fire raked her decks, William Densmore fought his gun with skill and courage throughout a furious 2-hour battle which resulted in the surrender of the rebel ram Tennessee and in the damaging and destruction of batteries at Fort Morgan.

== Death and burial ==
Medal of Honor recipient William Densmore died on June 17, 1865, of pneumonia and was buried in the Bishop's Burial Ground / Saint Joseph's Cemetery, Philadelphia, Pennsylvania, which was closed in August 1893 and the property sold in 1905. The remains of William Densmore and his widow Margaret née Maloney Densmore's family members were removed from Saint Joseph's Cemetery and reburied at New Cathedral Cemetery, Philadelphia, Pennsylvania, on April 26, 1901. Burial plot: Section G, range 7, lot 1+3.

Densmore's death notice in the June 19, 1865, Philadelphia Public Ledger newspaper read:

DENSMORE - On the 17th instant, at the Naval Asylum, WM DENSMORE, of the US receiving ship Princeton, in the 20th year of his age. The relatives and friends of the family are respectfully invited to attend the funeral, from his late residence, No. 117 Almond street, on Tuesday afternoon, at 4 o clock. To proceed to St. Josephs Church for services. Interment at the Bishop's ground
