= Hendrick Sharp =

- Civil War era Navy Medal of Honor
- Born: c. 1815; Málaga, Spain
- Died: July 1892; Norfolk Naval Shipyard, Portsmouth, Virginia
- Burial place: Captain Ted Conaway Memorial Naval Cemetery, Portsmouth, Virginia
- Military career
- Allegiance: United States
- Branch: United States Navy
- Rank: Seaman
- Unit: USS Richmond
- Conflicts: American Civil War • Battle of Mobile Bay
- Awards: Medal of Honor

Hendrick Sharp (c. 1815 – July 1892) was a Union Navy sailor in the American Civil War and a recipient of the U.S. military's highest decoration, the Medal of Honor, for his actions at the Battle of Mobile Bay.

== Military service ==
Born in 1815 in Spain, Sharp immigrated to the United States and was living in New York when he joined the U.S. Navy. He served in the Civil War as a seaman and gun captain on the USS Richmond. During the Battle of Mobile Bay on August 5, 1864, he "fought his gun with skill and courage" despite heavy fire. For this action, he was awarded the Medal of Honor four months later, on December 31, 1864.

== Medal of Honor citation ==
Rank and organization: Seaman, U.S. Navy. Accredited to: New York. G.O. No.: 45, 31 December 1864.

Sharp's official Medal of Honor citation reads:

As captain of a 100-pounder rifle gun on topgallant forecastle on board the U.S.S. Richmond during action against rebel forts and gunboats and with the ram Tennessee in Mobile Bay, 5 August 1864. Despite damage to his ship and the loss of several men on board as enemy fire raked her decks, Sharp fought his gun with skill and courage throughout a furious 2-hour battle which resulted in the surrender of the rebel ram Tennessee and in the damaging and destruction of the batteries at Fort Morgan.

== Death and burial ==
Medal of Honor recipient Hendrick Sharp died in late July 1892 aboard the receiving ship USS Franklin (1864) at the Norfolk Naval Shipyard, Portsmouth, Virginia. He was buried at Captain Ted Conaway Memorial Naval Cemetery in Portsmouth, Virginia. His status as a Medal of Honor recipient was not discovered until late 2009. A new grave marker indicating his decoration was unveiled in 2010.
