= Hugh Hamilton (sailor) =

- Civil War era Navy Medal of Honor
- Born: 1836; New York City, US
- Died: December 10, 1890 (aged 53–54); Brooklyn Navy Yard, New York, US
- Burial place: Oak Grove Cemetery (Fall River, Massachusetts)
- Military career
- Allegiance: United States of America
- Branch: Union Navy
- Rank: Coxswain
- Unit: (United States Navy) USS Richmond
- Conflicts: American Civil War • Battle of Mobile Bay
- Awards: Medal of Honor

Hugh Hamilton (born 1836 - December 10, 1890) was a Union Navy sailor in the American Civil War and a recipient of the U.S. military's highest decoration, the Medal of Honor, for his actions at the Battle of Mobile Bay.

== Military service ==
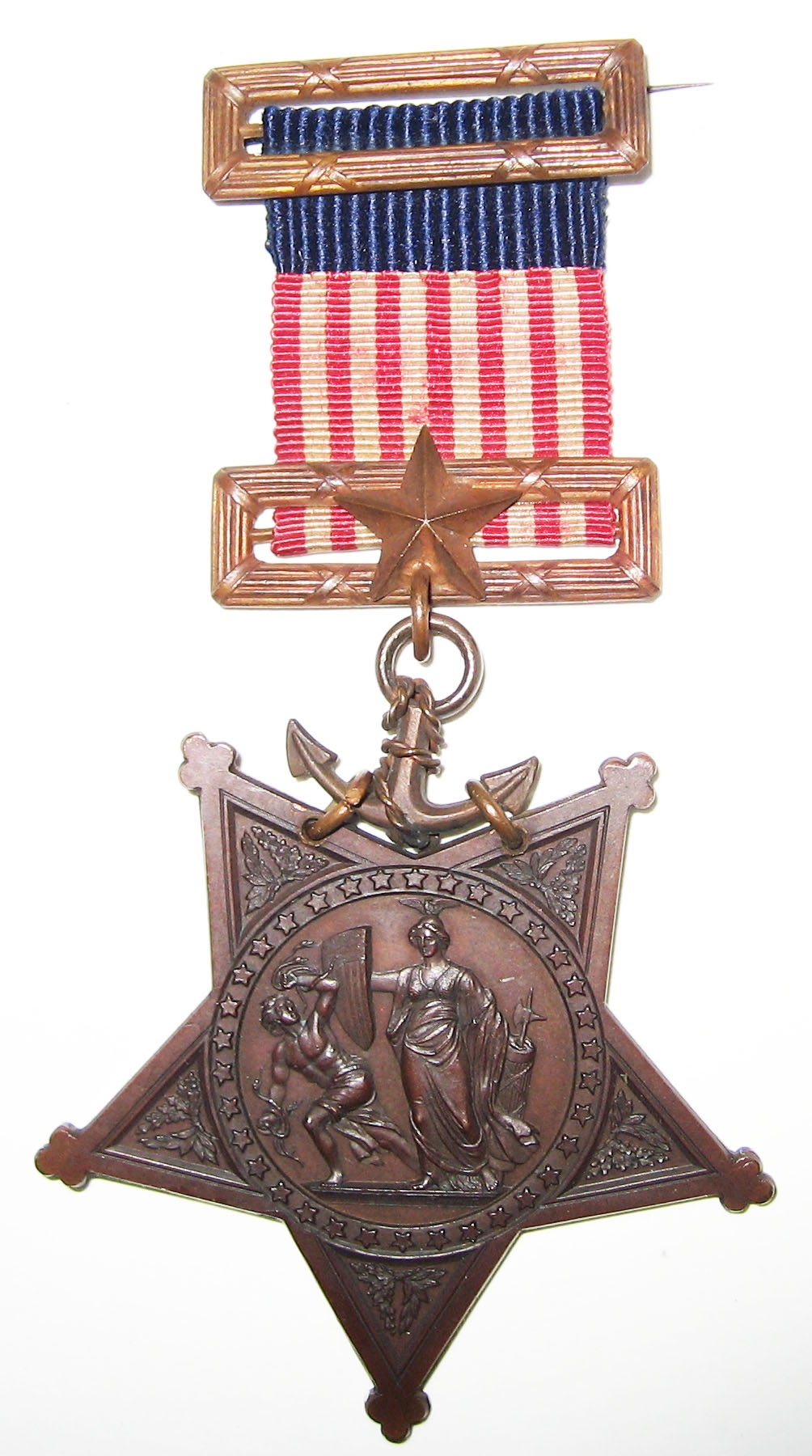
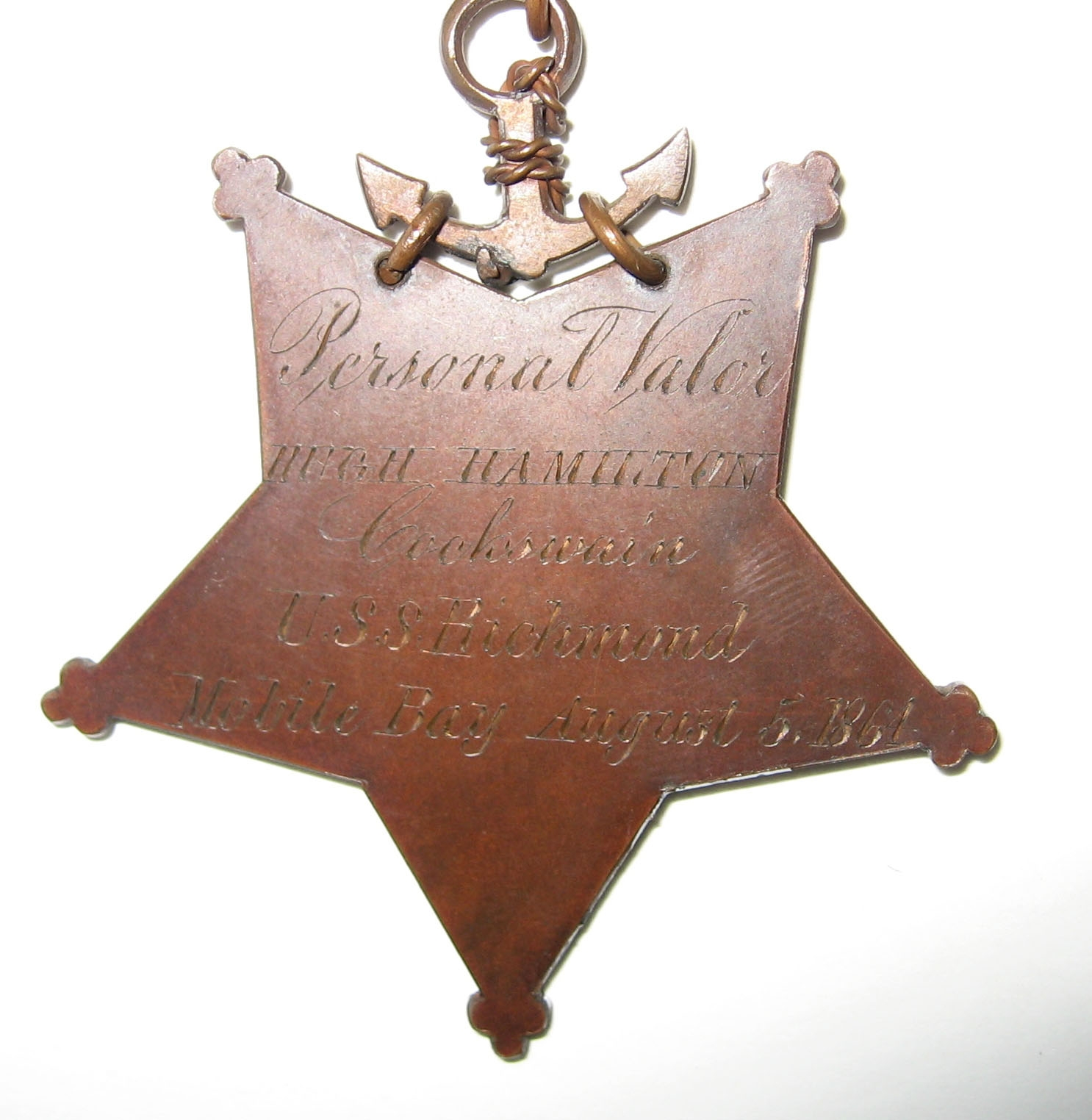
Hamilton's Medal of Honor, front and back

Born in 1836 in New York City, Hamilton was still living in the state of New York when he joined the Navy. He served during the Civil War as a coxswain on the USS Richmond. At the Battle of Mobile Bay on August 5, 1864, he "performed his duties with skill and courage" despite heavy fire. For this action, he was awarded the Medal of Honor four months later, on December 31, 1864.

== Medal of Honor citation ==
Rank and organization: Coxswain, U.S. Navy. Born: 1830, New York, N.Y. Accredited to: New York. G.O. No.: 45, 31 December 1864.

Hamilton's official Medal of Honor citation reads:

On board the U.S.S. Richmond during action against rebel forts and gunboats and with the ram Tennessee in Mobile Bay, 5 August 1864. Despite damage to his ship and the loss of several men on board as enemy fire raked her decks, Hamilton performed his duties with skill and courage throughout the prolonged battle which resulted in the surrender of the rebel ram Tennessee and in the successful attacks carried out on Fort Morgan.

== Death and burial ==
Medal of Honor recipient Hugh Hamilton died December 10, 1890, of cerebral apoplexy and was buried at Oak Grove Cemetery in Fall River, Massachusetts.

Hamilton's death notice in the December 11, 1890, Brooklyn Daily Eagle newspaper read:

Sudden Death of a Quarter Gunner on the Minnesota. Hugh Hamilton, quarter gunner on the training ship Minnesota, now living at the navy yard, fell dead of apoplexy on the forward gun deck of the ship at 3:45 P. M. yesterday. He was 53 years old. Assistant Surgeons Harris and Pickrell applied restoratives shortly after Hamilton fell, but without effect. The body of the deceased will be taken to Fall River to-day.

== See also ==
- (United States Navy) Navy
- USS Richmond
- Battle of Mobile Bay
