= Lebbeus Simkins =

Union Navy sailor in the American Civil War

- Born: c. 1836; Utica, New York
- Died: September 10, 1884 (aged 47–48)
- Burial place: Sacramento Historic City Cemetery, Sacramento, California
- Military career
- Allegiance: United States
- Branch: United States Navy
- Rank: Coxswain
- Unit: USS Richmond
- Conflicts: American Civil War • Battle of Mobile Bay
- Awards: Medal of Honor

Lebbeus Simkins (c. 1836 – September 10, 1884) was a Union Navy sailor in the American Civil War and a recipient of the U.S. military's highest decoration, the Medal of Honor, for his actions at the Battle of Mobile Bay.

Born in 1836 in Utica, New York, Simkins was still living in that state when he joined the Navy. He served during the Civil War as a coxswain on the USS Richmond. At the Battle of Mobile Bay on August 5, 1864, he "performed his duties with skill and courage" despite heavy fire. For this action, he was awarded the Medal of Honor four months later, on December 31, 1864.

Simkins's official Medal of Honor citation reads:

On board the U.S.S. Richmond during action against rebel forts and gunboats and with the ram Tennessee in Mobile Bay, 5 August 1864. Despite damage to his ship and the loss of several men on board as enemy fire raked her decks, Simkins performed his duties with skill and courage throughout a furious 2-hour battle which resulted in the surrender of the rebel ram Tennessee and in the damaging and destruction of batteries at Fort Morgan.

During his naval career Simkins also served on the USS North Carolina, USS Princeton, USS Brooklyn, and USS Lancaster. After the war, he moved to California and was a member of the San Diego Odd Fellows. He died on September 10, 1884, at age 47 or 48 and was buried at Old City Cemetery in Sacramento, California.
