= Walter B. Smith (Medal of Honor) =

- Born: September 8, 1827; New York, NY
- Died: Unknown
- Military career
- Allegiance: United States
- Branch: United States Navy
- Rank: Ordinary Seaman
- Unit: USS Richmond
- Conflicts: American Civil War • Battle of Mobile Bay
- Awards: Medal of Honor

Walter B. Smith (born 1827, date of death unknown) was a Union Navy sailor in the American Civil War and a recipient of the U.S. military's highest decoration, the Medal of Honor, for his actions at the Battle of Mobile Bay.

Born in 1827, in New York, Smith joined the Navy from that state. He served in the Civil War as an ordinary seaman on the USS Richmond. During the Battle of Mobile Bay on August 5, 1864, he manned an artillery gun on the topgallant forecastle (a deck at the top of the ship's forecastle). When Richmond became engaged with the CSS Tennessee, Smith fired his musket into the Confederate ship's gun ports. For these actions, he was awarded the Medal of Honor four months later, on December 31, 1864.

Smith's official Medal of Honor citation reads:

On board the U.S.S. Richmond during action against rebel forts and gunboats and with the ram Tennessee in Mobile Bay, 5 August 1864. Cool and courageous at his station throughout the prolonged action, Smith rendered outstanding service at the 100-pounder rifle on the topgallant forecastle and while firing his musket into the gun ports of the rebel Tennessee.
