= George Parks (Medal of Honor) =

US Navy sailor and Medal of Honor recipient (1824–1870)

- Civil War era Navy Medal of Honor
- Born: June 16, 1824; Schenectady County, New York
- Died: December 6, 1870 (aged 46); Portsmouth, Virginia
- Burial place: Union Cemetery; Mellenville, New York
- Military career
- Allegiance: United States of America; Union
- Branch: United States Navy; Union Navy
- Rank: Captain of the Forecastle
- Unit: USS Richmond
- Conflicts: American Civil War • Battle of Mobile Bay
- Awards: Medal of Honor

George Parks (June 16, 1824 – December 6, 1870) was a Union Navy sailor in the American Civil War and a recipient of the U.S. military's highest decoration, the Medal of Honor, for his actions at the Battle of Mobile Bay.

== Military service ==
Born in 1824 in Schenectady County, New York, Parks was still living in that state when he joined the Navy. He served during the Civil War as a captain of the forecastle on the USS Richmond. At the Battle of Mobile Bay on August 5, 1864, he "performed his duties with skill and courage" despite heavy fire. For this action, he was awarded the Medal of Honor four months later, on December 31, 1864.

== Medal of Honor citation ==
Rank and organization: Captain of the Forecastle, U.S. Navy. Accredited to: New York. G.O. No.: 45, 31 December 1864.

Parks's official Medal of Honor citation reads:

On board the U.S.S. Richmond during action against rebel forts and gunboats and with the ram Tennessee in Mobile Bay, 5 August 1864. Despite damage to his ship and the loss of several men on board as enemy fire raked her decks, Parks performed his duties with skill and courage throughout a furious 2-hour battle which resulted in the surrender of the rebel ram Tennessee and in the damaging and destruction of batteries at Fort Morgan.
