= John Brazell =

Union sailor

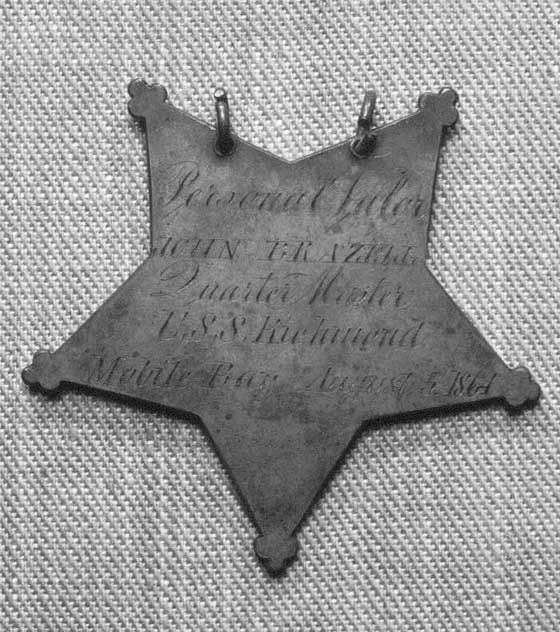
- Reverse of Brazell's Medal of Honor
- Born: 1837; Philadelphia, Pennsylvania
- Died: August 12, 1866 (aged 28–29); Philadelphia, Pennsylvania
- Military career
- Allegiance: United States
- Branch: United States Navy
- Rank: Chief Quartermaster
- Units: USS Brooklyn; USS Richmond
- Conflicts: American Civil War • Battle of Mobile Bay
- Awards: Medal of Honor

John Brazell (1837 – August 12, 1866) was a Union Navy sailor in the American Civil War and a recipient of the U.S. military's highest decoration, the Medal of Honor, for his actions at the Battle of Mobile Bay.

== Biography ==
Born in 1837 in Philadelphia, Pennsylvania, Brazell was still living in that city when he joined the Navy. He served during the Civil War first on the USS Brooklyn. In the April 1862 Battle of Forts Jackson and St. Philip, Brooklyn fought Confederate ships in the Mississippi and passed artillery batteries at Chalmette, Louisiana, leading to the capture of New Orleans. The ship then proceeded up the river and Brazell participated in the passage of Vicksburg, Mississippi, in mid-1862 before transferring to the USS Richmond. At the Battle of Mobile Bay on August 5, 1864, he showed "coolness and good conduct" while serving as a quartermaster and gun captain aboard Richmond. For this action, he was awarded the Medal of Honor four months later, on December 31, 1864.

Brazell's official Medal of Honor citation reads:

Served on board the U.S.S. Richmond in the action at Mobile Bay, 5 August 1864, where he was recommended for coolness and good conduct as a gun captain during that engagement which resulted in the capture of the rebel ram Tennessee and in the destruction of Fort Morgan. Brazell served gallantly throughout the actions with Forts Jackson and St. Philip, the Chalmettes, batteries below Vicksburg, and was present at the surrender of New Orleans while on board the U.S.S. Brooklyn.

Brazell reached the rank of chief quartermaster before his death in Philadelphia on August 12, 1866.

== See also ==
- List of American Civil War Medal of Honor recipients: A-F
