= George Parks =

George Parks may refer to:

- George Alexander Parks (1883–1984), American engineer and Governor of Alaska Territory
- George N. Parks (1953–2010), University of Massachusetts band director
- George Parks (Medal of Honor) (1823–?), American Medal of Honor recipient
- W. George Parks (1904–1975), chemist
- George Parks Highway, a major highway in Alaska, which was named for George Alexander Parks
