= Brazell =

Brazell is a surname. Notable people with the surname include:

- Bennie Brazell (born 1982), American footballer
- Craig Brazell (born 1980), American baseball player
- David Brazell (1875–1959), Welsh singer
- John Brazell (1837–1866), American sailor
- Karen Brazell (1938–2012), American professor and translator
- Rashawn Brazell, American murder victim

== See also ==
- Brazel
