= Thomas Mitchell (Medal of Honor) =

United States Navy Medal of Honor recipient (1857–1942)

- Born: 1857; New York City, US
- Died: July 18, 1942 (aged 84–85)
- Military career
- Allegiance: United States
- Branch: United States Navy
- Rank: Landsman
- Unit: USS Richmond
- Awards: Medal of Honor

Thomas Mitchell (1857 – July 18, 1942) was a United States Navy sailor and a recipient of the United States military's highest decoration, the Medal of Honor.

Born in 1857 in New York, New York, Mitchell joined the Navy from that state. By November 17, 1879, he was serving as a landsman on the USS Richmond at Shanghai, China. On that day, he rescued a shipmate, First Class Boy M. F. Caulan, from drowning. For this action, he was awarded the Medal of Honor five years later, on October 18, 1884.

Mitchell's official Medal of Honor citation reads:

Serving on board the U.S.S. Richmond, Mitchell rescued from drowning, M. F. Caulan, first class boy, serving with him on the same vessel, at Shanghai, China, 17 November 1879.

Mitchell left the Navy while still a landsman.

Mitchell died on July 18, 1942, at age 84 or 85. He was interred at Long Island National Cemetery on July 23, 1942.

== See also ==
- List of Medal of Honor recipients during peacetime
