= Brazel (surname) =

Brazel is a surname. It may refer to:

- Gregory Brazel (born 1954), convicted Australian criminal serving three consecutive life sentences
- James Brazel, a judge of the Supreme Court of South Australia
- Jesse Wayne Brazel (1877-1915?), an American cowboy
- William "Mac" Brazel, a witness in the Roswell UFO incident

== See also ==
- Brazell
- Brazil (disambiguation)
