= William Wells (sailor) =

American Civil War Medal of Honor recipient (1832–1868)

- Civil War era Navy Medal of Honor
- Born: 1832; Germany
- Died: February 8, 1868 (aged 35–36) on the receiving ship USS Vermont at the Brooklyn Navy Yard
- Burial place: Brooklyn Naval Hospital Cemetery
- Military career
- Allegiance: United States of America; Union
- Branch: United States Navy; Union Navy
- Rank: Quartermaster
- Units: USS Brooklyn; USS Richmond; USS Colorado; USS Wampanoag
- Conflicts: American Civil War; *Battle of Mobile Bay
- Awards: Medal of Honor

William Wells (1832 – February 8, 1868) was a United States Navy sailor and a recipient of America's highest military decoration—the Medal of Honor—for his actions in the American Civil War.

Wells had reached the rank of quartermaster by the time his Medal of Honor was awarded on December 31, 1864.

== Medal of Honor citation ==
Rank and organization: Quartermaster, U.S. Navy. Born: 1832, Germany. Accredited to: New York. G.O. No.: 45, December 31, 1864.

Citation:

As landsman and lookout on board the U.S.S. Richmond during action against rebel forts and gunboats and with the ram Tennessee in Mobile Bay, 5 August 1864. Despite damage to his ship the loss of several men on board as enemy fire raked her decks, Wells performed his duties with skill and courage throughout a furious 2-hour battle which resulted in the surrender of the rebel ram Tennessee and in the damaging and destruction of batteries at Fort Morgan.

== See also ==
- List of American Civil War Medal of Honor recipients: T–Z
