= Thomas E. Atkinson =

United States Navy sailor and Medal of Honor recipient

- Civil War era Navy Medal of Honor
- Born: c. 1824; Salem, Massachusetts, U.S.
- Died: Mar. 9, 1868
- Burial place: Buried on the island of San Lorenzo, Peru
- Military career
- Allegiance: United States
- Branch: United States Navy
- Service years: 1842 - 1864
- Rank: Yeoman
- Units: USS Congress; USS Richmond
- Conflicts: Uruguayan Civil War; American Civil War • Battle of the Head of Passes • Battle of Forts Jackson and St. Philip • Battle of Mobile Bay
- Awards: Medal of Honor

Thomas E. Atkinson (born c. 1824, date of death unknown) was a Union Navy sailor in the American Civil War and a recipient of the U.S. military's highest decoration, the Medal of Honor, for his actions at the Battle of Mobile Bay.

== Biography ==
Born in about 1824 in Salem, Massachusetts, Atkinson was still living in that city when he joined the Navy. He served as a petty officer on the frigate USS Congress from 1842 to 1846 and took part in the 1844 capture of the Argentinian blockade fleet outside the port city of Montevideo in the Uruguayan Civil War.

Atkinson transferred to the USS Richmond in September 1860 and served on that ship as a yeoman during the American Civil War. He was present at the Battle of the Head of Passes of the Mississippi River on October 12, 1861, and at an engagement against Fort McRee near Pensacola, Florida, in November 1861. In the April 1862 Battle of Forts Jackson and St. Philip, Richmond fought Confederate ships in the Mississippi and passed artillery batteries at Chalmette, Louisiana, leading to the capture of New Orleans. The ship then proceeded up the river and Atkinson participated in the passage of Vicksburg, Mississippi, in mid-1862 and the action at Port Hudson in March 1863. At the Battle of Mobile Bay on August 5, 1864, he was in charge of supplying ammunition to the ship's Parrott rifle. For his "coolness and energy" in this battle, he was awarded the Medal of Honor four months later, on December 31, 1864.

Atkinson's official Medal of Honor citation reads:

On board the U.S.S. Richmond, Mobile Bay, 5 August 1864; commended for coolness and energy in supplying the rifle ammunition, which was under his sole charge, in the action in Mobile Bay on the morning of 5 August 1864. He was a petty officer on board the U.S. Frigate Congress in 1842-46; was present and assisted in capturing the whole of the Buenos Ayrean fleet by that vessel off Montevideo; joined the Richmond in September 1860; was in the action with Fort McRea, the Head of the Passes of the Mississippi, Forts Jackson and St. Philip, the Chalmettes, the rebel ironclads and gunboats below New Orleans, Vicksburg, Port Hudson, and at the surrender of New Orleans.

== See also ==
- List of American Civil War Medal of Honor recipients: A-F
