= David Sprowle =

United States Marine Corps Medal of Honor recipient

- Born: c. 1811; Lisbon, New York, US
- Burial place: Red Mills Cemetery Lisbon, New York
- Military career
- Allegiance: United States of America; Union
- Branch: United States Army; United States Marine Corps
- Service years: 1840 - 1845 (Army); 1845 - 1866 (Marine Corps)
- Rank: Orderly sergeant
- Unit: USS Richmond (1860)
- Conflicts: American Civil War
- Awards: Medal of Honor

David Sprowle (born c. 1811) was an orderly sergeant serving in the United States Marine Corps during the American Civil War who received the Medal of Honor for his actions in the Battle of Mobile Bay.

== Biography ==
Sprowle was born in about 1811 in Lisbon, New York. He initially enlisted in the Army in May 1840 as David Sprowls, and after leaving enlisted in the Marine Corps on June 13, 1845. He was an orderly sergeant assigned to the Marine Detachment aboard the USS Richmond (1860) when it was sent to fight in the American Civil War during the Battle of Mobile Bay.

He was medically discharged from the Marine Corps on December 1, 1866. Although his date of death, cause and burial location is unknown, there is a cenotaph and headstone for him located in Red Mills Cemetery in Lisbon, New York.

== Medal of Honor citation ==
Rank and organization: Orderly Sergeant, U.S. Marine Corps. Born: 1811, Lisbon, N.Y. Accredited to: New York. G.O. No.: 45, 31 December 1864.

Citation:

On board the U.S.S. Richmond during action against rebel forts and gunboats, and with the ram Tennessee in Mobile Bay, 5 August 1864. Despite damage to his ship and the loss of several men on board as enemy fire raked her decks, Orderly Sgt. Sprowle inspired the men of the marine guard and directed a division of great guns throughout the furious battle which resulted in the surrender of the rebel ram Tennessee and in the damaging and destruction of batteries at Fort Morgan.

== See also ==
- List of American Civil War Medal of Honor recipients: Q–S
