= USS Philippi =

Gunboat of the United States Navy

Coordinates: 30.3835°N 88.0334°W

History

Confederate States
- Name: SS Ella
- Captured: by U.S. Navy forces 10 November 1863

United States
- Name: USS Philippi
- Namesake: Philippi, an ancient city in Macedonia
- Acquired: 23 February 1864
- Commissioned: early April 1864
- Fate: Sunk 5 August 1864

General characteristics
- Type: Steamer
- Tonnage: 311 GRT
- Length: 140 ft (43 m)
- Beam: 24 ft (7.3 m)
- Depth of hold: 9 ft 10 in (3.00 m)
- Propulsion: Steam engine with sidewheel
- Complement: 41
- Armament: two 12-pounder rifles, one 20-pounder Parrott, one 24 pounder howitzer

USS Philippi was a blockade runner captured by the Union Navy during the American Civil War. She served the Union Navy's struggle against the Confederate States of America as a picket, patrol and dispatch vessel.

== Service history ==
Union steamer USS Howquah discovered new and fast sidewheeler Ella 10 November 1863 steaming along the coast north of Fort Fisher, North Carolina. She immediately gave chase and fired a shot at the blockade runner which glanced off Ella’s gallows frame and caused her to surrender. The Boston, Massachusetts, Prize Court subsequently condemned the prize and sold her to the Navy 23 February 1864. Renamed Philippi four days later, the steamer commissioned early in April. Philippi was ordered to New Orleans, Louisiana, on the 11th for duty in the West Gulf Blockading Squadron, Philippi served the squadron as a picket, patrol, and dispatch vessel until set afire by Confederate artillery and destroyed while following Admiral David Farragut’s fleet into Mobile Bay 5 August 1864.

== See also ==
- Blockade runners of the American Civil War
