= CSS Morgan =

History

Confederate States
- Name: Morgan
- Laid down: 1861
- Launched: 1862
- Commissioned: 1862
- Decommissioned: May 4, 1865
- Fate: Surrendered to U.S. Navy; sold December 1865

General characteristics
- Displacement: 863 tons
- Length: 202 ft (62 m)
- Beam: 38 ft (12 m)
- Draft: 7 ft 2 in (2.18 m)
- Propulsion: Steam engine
- Speed: 10 knots (19 km/h; 12 mph)
- Armament: 10 guns

CSS Morgan was a partially armored gunboat of the Confederate States Navy in the American Civil War.

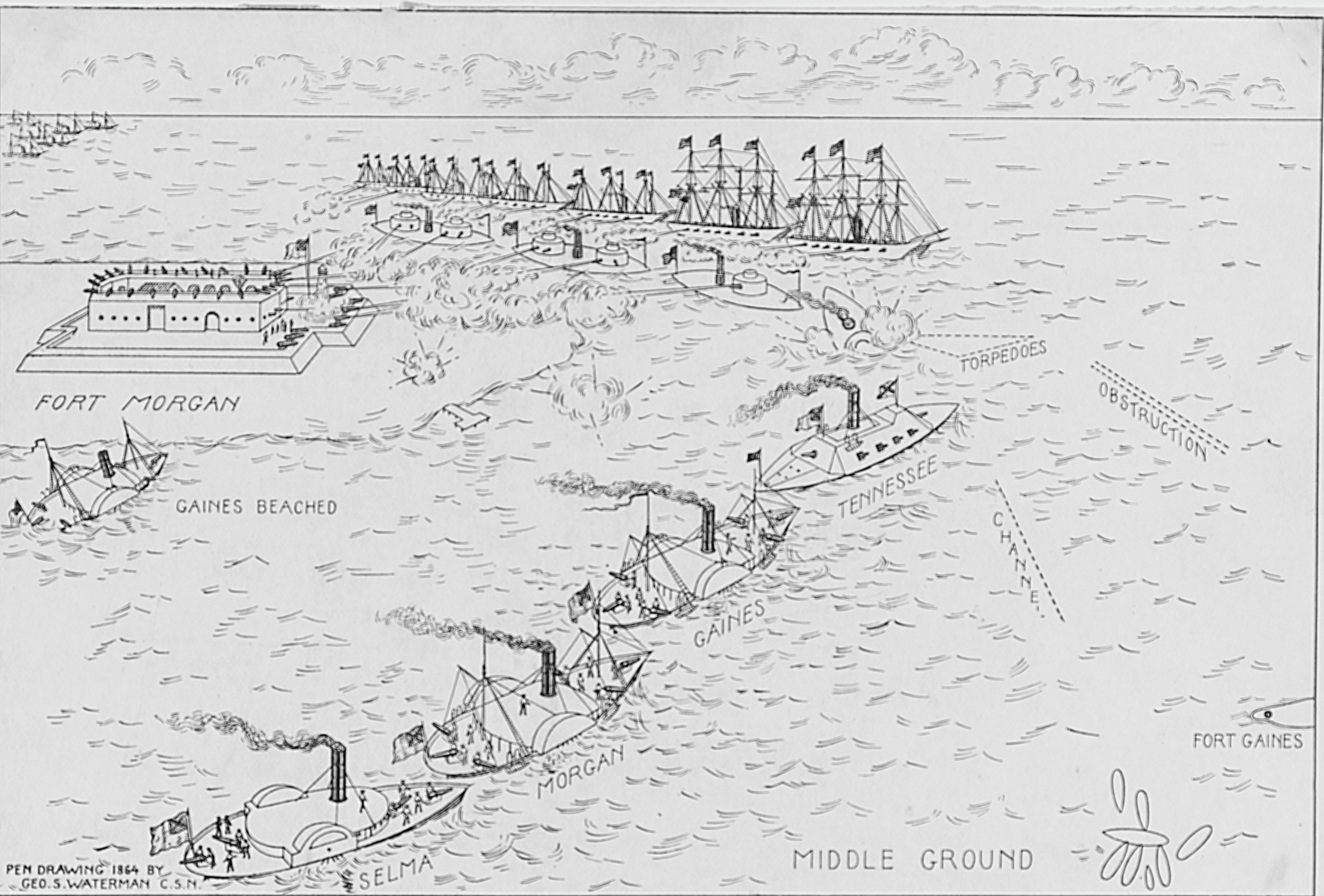
CSS Morgan, Gaines and other ships at the battle of Mobile Bay.

Morgan was built at Mobile, Alabama in 1861–62. She operated in the waters around Mobile from the time of her completion early in 1862 to the close of hostilities. One reference of October 1862 gave her name as Admiral.

Morgan, commanded by Commander George W. Harrison, CSN, took an active part in the Battle of Mobile Bay on August 5, 1864. Situated well to the right of the Confederate line of battle as the enemy proceeded up the channel, she was able to deliver a telling broadside raking fire against USS Hartford and others. Toward the end of the engagement, she was pursued by USS Metacomet but succeeded in driving her off. Morgan, attempting to avoid capture, then turned toward shallow water, grounded briefly, but continued on her perilous route and reached the guns at Fort Morgan. She dispatched a boat which effected the destruction of the Union gunboat USS Philippi below the fort. When the Union victory was apparent, Captain Harrison initially wanted to scuttle the ship, but was persuaded by his second in command, Lieutenant Thomas Locke Harrison (no relation) that she could be saved by boldly running the gauntlet up to Mobile. Although hotly pursued and shelled by cruisers for a large part of the 25-mile starlight voyage, she reached the outer obstructions near Mobile at daybreak, and that afternoon was permitted to pass through.

Morgan continued to serve in the Mobile area. In April 1865 she participated in the battle off Blakeley Island in the last days of the Civil War. Blakely Island is located just off the docks of Mobile between the city and Old Spanish Fort located on the eastern shore of Mobile Bay. It was commanded by Captain Fry and sustained considerable damage in her final battle, but survived the war. CSS Morgan stood alone between the City of Mobile and the invading Union troops. On May 4, 1865, Commodore Ebenezer Farrand, commanding Confederate Naval Forces in the State of Alabama, ordered the surrender of Morgan to the United States Navy. She was sold the following December.
