= CSS Gaines =

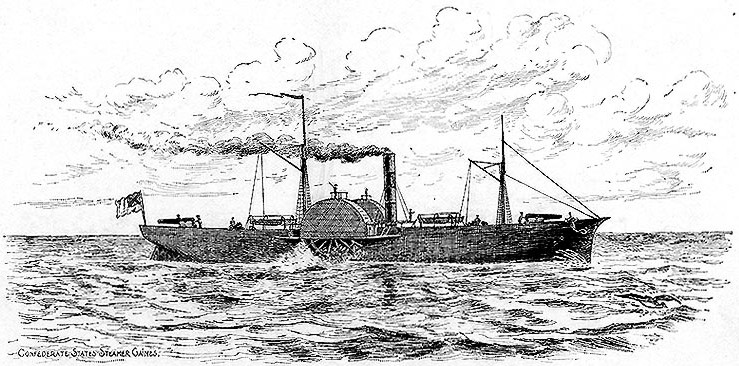
- CSS Gaines

History

Confederate States
- Name: Gaines
- Laid down: 1861
- Launched: 1862
- Commissioned: 1862
- Fate: Grounded and abandoned August 5, 1864

General characteristics
- Displacement: 863 tons
- Length: 202 ft (62 m)
- Beam: 38 ft (12 m)
- Draft: 6 ft (1.8 m)
- Propulsion: Steam engine
- Speed: 10 knots (19 km/h; 12 mph)
- Complement: 130 officers and men
- Armament: 1 8" rifled cannon, 5 32-pounder cannons

CSS Gaines was a wooden side wheel gunboat, weighing 863 tons, constructed by the Confederates at Mobile, Alabama, during 1861–62. The ship was hastily built with unseasoned wood, which was partially covered with 2-inch iron plating. Gaines resembled CSS Morgan except that she had high pressure boilers. Operating in the waters of Mobile Bay, under the command of Lieutenant John W. Bennett, CSN, she was heavily damaged during the Battle of Mobile Bay on August 5, 1864. She was sinking as she left the battle and became grounded while still in 24 feet (7 m) of water, within 500 yards (457 m) of Fort Morgan. Two crewman died in the engagement, 3–4 were wounded, and 129 escaped to Mobile. Her hull may have been located in Mobile Bay in 1989, but the find has not been confirmed.
