= Fort Morgan (Alabama) =

- U.S. National Register of Historic Places
- U.S. National Historic Landmark
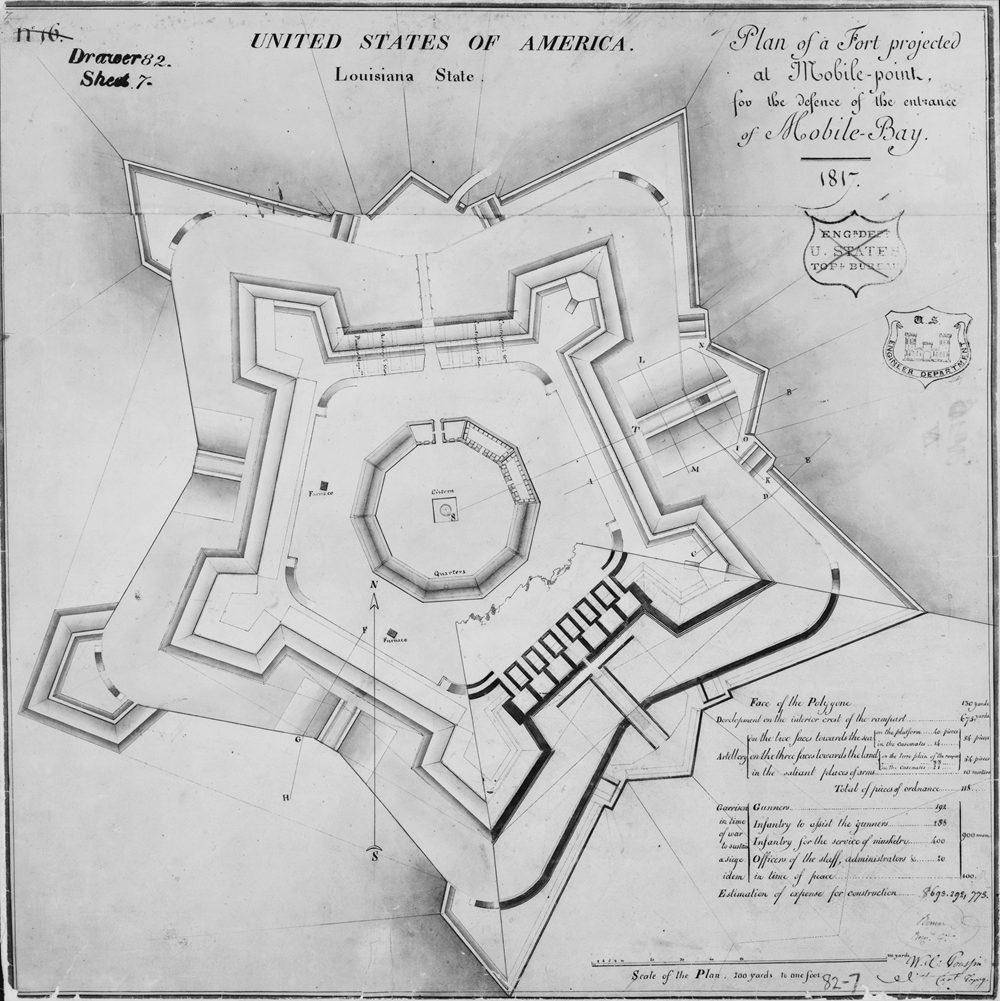
- Original plan for the fort, dated 1817.

- Location within Alabama
- Location: Western terminus of AL 180; Gasque, Alabama
- Coordinates: 30°13′41″N 88°1′23″W
- Built: 1819–1834
- Architect: Simon Bernard
- NRHP reference No.: 66000146

Significant dates
- Added to NRHP: October 15, 1966
- Designated NHL: December 19, 1960

Fort Morgan is a historic masonry pentagonal bastion fort at the mouth of Mobile Bay, Alabama, United States. Named for American Revolutionary War hero Daniel Morgan, it was built on the site of the earlier Fort Bowyer, an earthen and stockade-type fortification involved in the final land battles of the War of 1812. Construction was completed in 1834, and it received its first garrison in March of the same year.

Fort Morgan is at the tip of Mobile Point at the western terminus of State Route 180 (Alabama). It and Dauphin Island, on which Fort Gaines is situated, enclose Mobile Bay. The Alabama Historical Commission maintains the site.

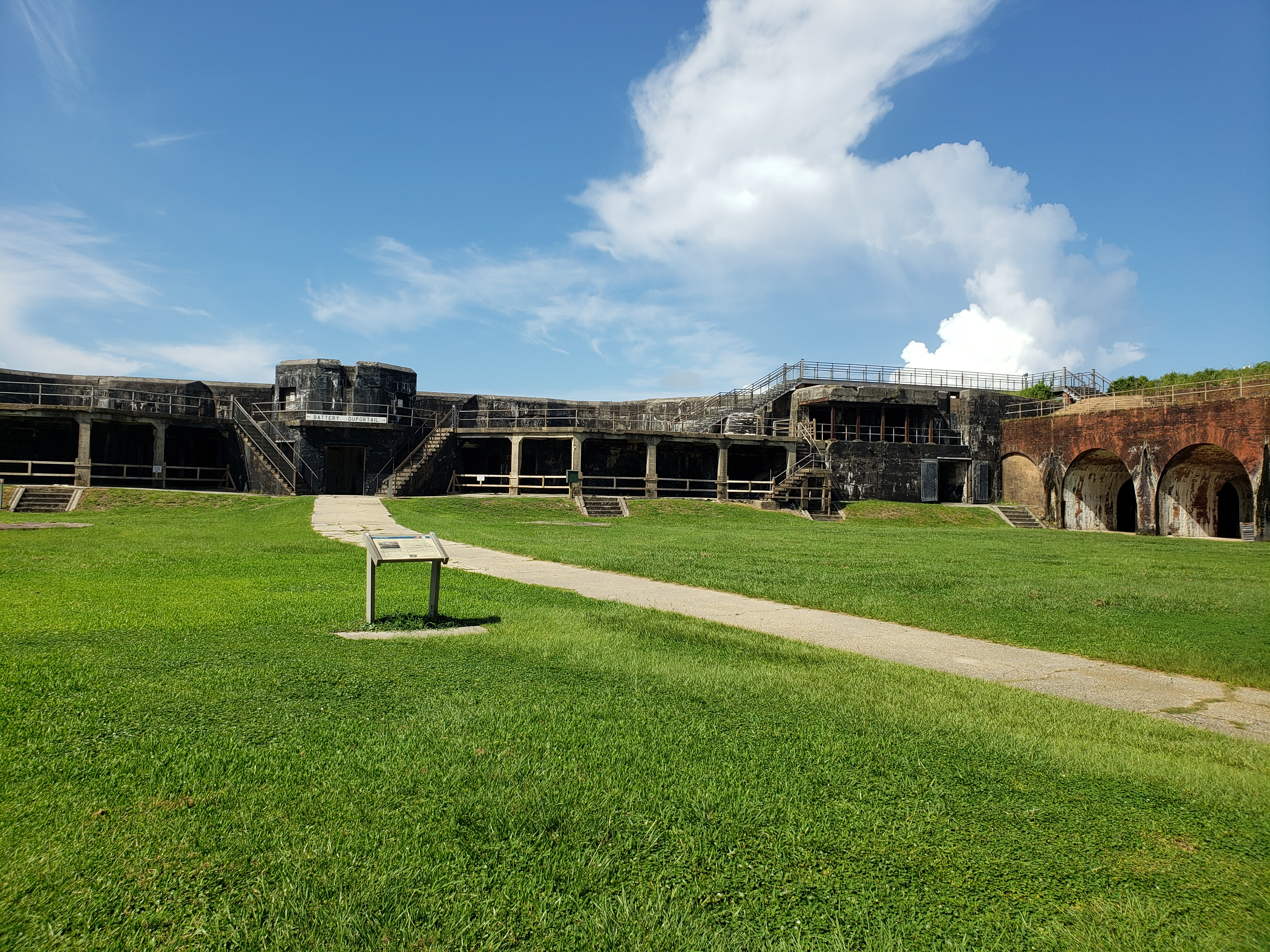
The courtyard inside Fort Morgan.

== War of 1812 ==
After the departure of the Spanish from Mobile in April 1813, the United States built an earth and wood redoubt on Mobile Point, ultimately naming it Fort Bowyer after Col. John Bowyer, who completed the construction before leaving in 1814. In September 1814, the fort withstood a British naval and land attack, known as the First Battle of Fort Bowyer. The British returned in February 1815 after their defeat at the Battle of New Orleans and again launched an attack that became known as the Second Battle of Fort Bowyer. This time they were successful, with its American garrison surrendering the fort. Before the British could continue their attack towards Mobile, Alabama, they received word that the Treaty of Ghent, ending the war, had been signed on Christmas Eve, 1814. When word of the treaty's ratification arrived shortly thereafter, the British withdrew. The site was a logical one for a more substantial fort that could defend itself from landward and protect the entrance to the bay, leading to Fort Morgan replacing Fort Bowyer.

== Construction ==
After the War of 1812, the United States began a program to strengthen its seacoast defenses. As part of this program, in 1818, the U.S. Army contracted with Benjamin Hopkins of Vermont to build a large masonry fort on Mobile Point after a design by Simon Bernard, who had been a military engineer for Napoleon. However, Hopkins died a year later in a yellow fever epidemic, having accomplished little. The following contractor, Samuel Hawkins of New York, died in 1821 before completing anything on the project. The U.S. Army turned the task over to the United States Army Corps of Engineers under Captain René Edward De Russy. Using enslaved laborers, De Russy made some progress before he became sick in 1825 and turned the work over to his deputy, Lieutenant Cornelius Ogden. Ogden completed the work in March 1834 and turned the fort over to Captain F.S. Belton, commander of Company B, 2nd U.S. Artillery. This unit remained at the fort for about a year and a half before its transfer to Florida to assist in the Second Seminole War. Multiple concrete arches have been embedded into the walls of Fort Morgan from the beginning of the American Civil War to today.

== Civil War ==
The flag of the Montgomery Rifles militia that was flown over the fort from January to March, 1861. A replica of the flag currently flies over the fort.

Eight days before Alabama declared secession from the United States, Colonel John B. Todd attacked the fort with four companies of Alabama volunteers, capturing it before dawn on 3 January 1861. The Confederates then proceeded to strengthen the defenses of Mobile Bay. The key point was the Main Ship Channel opposite Fort Morgan, as this was the only approach where the water was deep enough to permit major warships to pass. To defend this area, the Confederates placed 18 of the fort's heaviest guns (including two 7-inch Brooke rifles and two British-made 8-inch Blakely rifles) so that they could bear on the channel. They also built redoubts and trenches east of the fort to impede any attack via land. Lastly, they complemented the land defenses with a small flotilla consisting of the ram Tennessee, and three gunboats, Morgan, Gaines and Selma, all under the command of Admiral Franklin Buchanan.

Fort Morgan provided protective fire for blockade runners during the war. All 17 vessels that ran out of the bay eluded capture, as did 19 of the 21 that attempted to enter. After Confederates observed U.S. Army soldiers in the Sand Island Lighthouse reconnoitering Fort Morgan, the fort fired on the island, destroying the lighthouse.

During the Battle of Mobile Bay on 5 August 1864, United States Navy forces under Admiral David G. Farragut passed Fort Morgan and entered Mobile Bay. Farragut captured the Tennessee and the Selma, forced the beaching and burning of Gaines, and captured Fort Gaines. This freed U.S. Army units under U.S. Major General Gordon Granger to besiege Fort Morgan. After two weeks of bombardment from sea and land, Richard Lucian Page, commander of the fort, surrendered on 23 August 1864, after first spiking the fort's guns. During the siege, the wooden roof of the fort's citadel, a ten-sided barracks located in the center of the fort used to house the enlisted men, caught fire and the structure was badly damaged. Rather than restore it, post-war crews used the ruins as a brick source for repairing the fort. The remains of the citadel were razed in the 1880s for use as a breakwater.

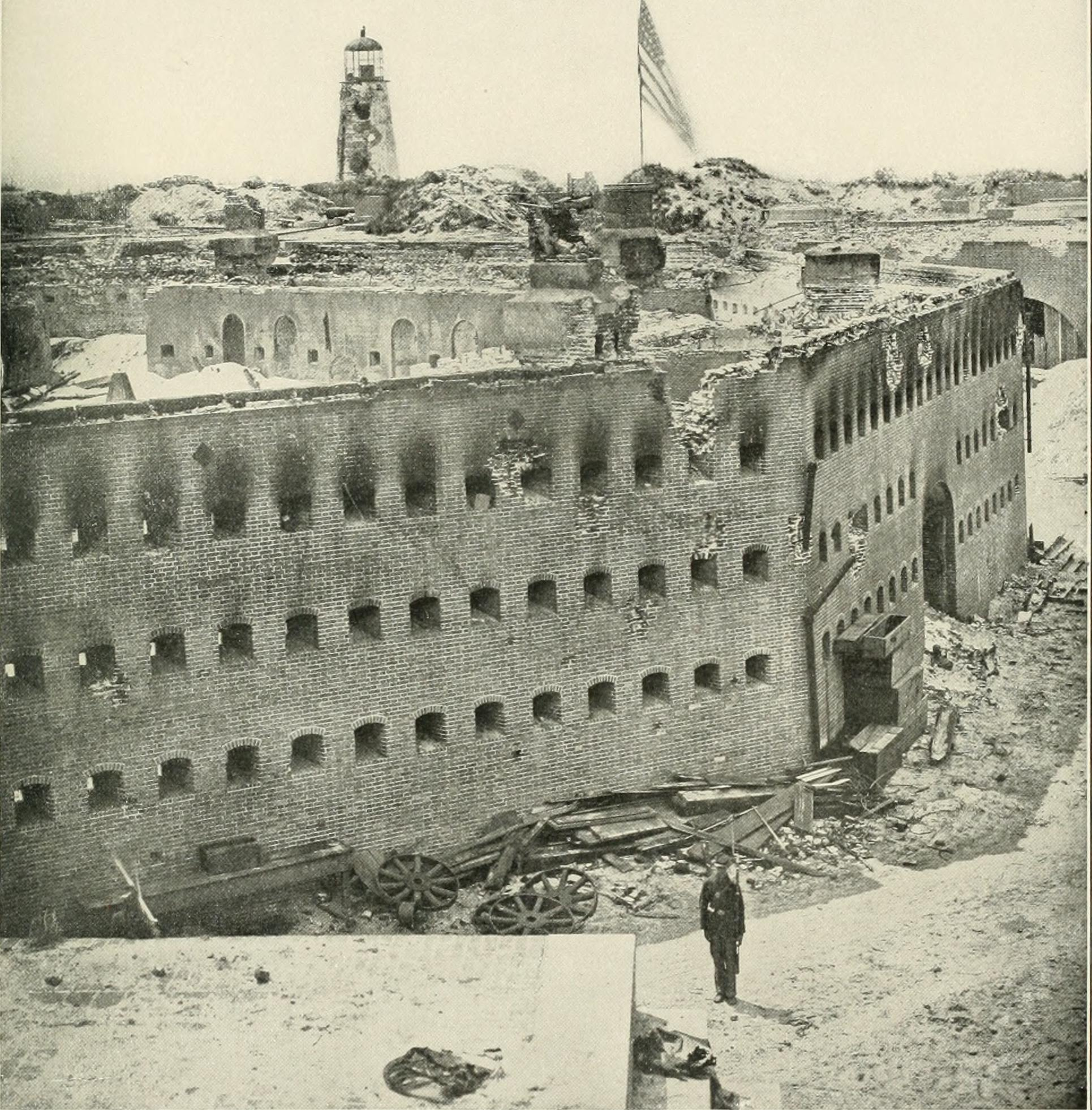
After recapture by the U.S. Army

Once again under U.S. control, the U.S. Army used it as a base for reconnaissance raids and then as a staging area for the Battle of Spanish Fort and the Battle of Fort Blakeley, which occurred days before General Robert E. Lee surrendered at the Battle of Appomattox Court House.

== Late 19th century ==
During a renovation project in the 1870s, the fort received 12 200-pounder Parrott rifled cannons. Eventually, the U.S. Government abandoned the fort, letting it fall into disrepair. Then, under the presidency of Grover Cleveland, Secretary of War William Endicott chaired the Endicott Board, which led to a program of building new concrete batteries. Between 1895 and 1900, Fort Morgan received five concrete batteries with fire control, electricity, and communications.

The first battery, Battery Bowyer, was operational during the Spanish–American War. It had four 8-inch breech-loading guns on disappearing carriages. The battery closed in 1917, and the guns were removed for conversion to railway guns for service in Europe in World War I.

At the beginning of the Spanish–American War, Fort Morgan also received eight 10-inch smooth-bore muzzle-loading Rodman cannons, converted to 8-inch rifles with the insertion of a barrel sleeve. This was a makeshift, and the U.S. Army later gave the guns away to cities for Civil War memorials.

The second battery, completed in 1900, was Battery Dearborn, named for Major General Henry Dearborn. The battery had eight breech-loading 12-inch coast defense mortars in two four-gun pits. The intent was that the mortars would rain down shells on the vessels' less heavily armored decks if enemy vessels approached.

The third battery, also completed in 1900, was Battery Duportail, named for Major General Louis Lebègue Duportail. Its armament consisted of two 12-inch breech-loading rifles on disappearing carriages. The battery was decommissioned in 1923. The Army removed the breechblocks and plugged the breeches before abandoning the guns. The Army scrapped the guns in the early 1940s.

The fourth battery was Battery Thomas, named for Captain Evan Thomas, who had been killed in the Battle of Sand Butte in 1873 during the Modoc War. This battery's armament consisted of two British 4.7-inch rapid-fire Armstrong guns. The battery's role was to prevent smaller enemy vessels from passing through the ship's channel in front of the fort. The battery was deactivated in 1917, and its guns were removed.

The fifth battery was Battery Schenk, named for Lieutenant William T. Schenck, who was killed in action in Luzon in 1900 during the Philippine–American War. The battery initially held two, later increased to three, 3-inch rapid-fire guns. It also protected the ship channel.

== 20th century ==
Hurricanes in 1906 and in July 1916 caused great damage to the wooden houses at Fort Morgan along Officer's Row. The wide porches that helped cool the buildings in summer were particularly vulnerable.

In 1915, the United States Army Coast Artillery Corps (CAC) built an experimental battery called Battery Test about a mile from Fort Morgan. The battery held a single 10-inch gun on a disappearing carriage. Then in 1916, the Navy had two battleships, the USS New York and the USS Arkansas, shell the battery for two days to see how well it would survive, which it did with remarkably little damage. The gun was removed shortly after the tests.

After the United States declared war on Germany in April 1917, the fort trained CAC soldiers in modern weapons. The fort also trained field anti-aircraft batteries. In 1920 the fort received four British 9.2-inch howitzers. These guns were abandoned and scrapped in 1924 when the Army abandoned the fort. Thereafter, the base deteriorated.

During World War I, the Army established a radio transmitting and receiving station at Fort Morgan as a part of a nationwide Morse-code communication network. The transmitter had the call letters WUR. When Fort Morgan was abandoned, the call letters were transferred to Fort McClellan, Alabama.

In April 1942, the Army re-occupied the fort and constructed an adjacent airfield. Initially, the CAC brought five Model 1918 155mm (6.1-inch) guns to equip the fort. The Army placed two on top of Fort Morgan on mounts that permitted 360 degrees traverse. The remaining three guns stood on the fort's parade ground.

The United States Department of War turned Fort Morgan over to Alabama in 1946, and the Army completely abandoned the fort in 1947.

== Recent developments ==
Fort Morgan was designated a National Historic Landmark in 1960.

In 2007 it was listed as "one of the nation's 10 most endangered battle sites" by the Civil War Preservation Trust in History Under Siege: A Guide to America's Most Endangered Civil War Battlefields.

In June 2008, a 90-pound live Union naval shell was uncovered at the site. The shell was from a Parrott rifle on a U.S. Navy warship and was fired at the fort in the summer of 1864. The discovery came during excavations as part of a project meant to repair cracks in the walls.

Historic and modern views of Fort Morgan
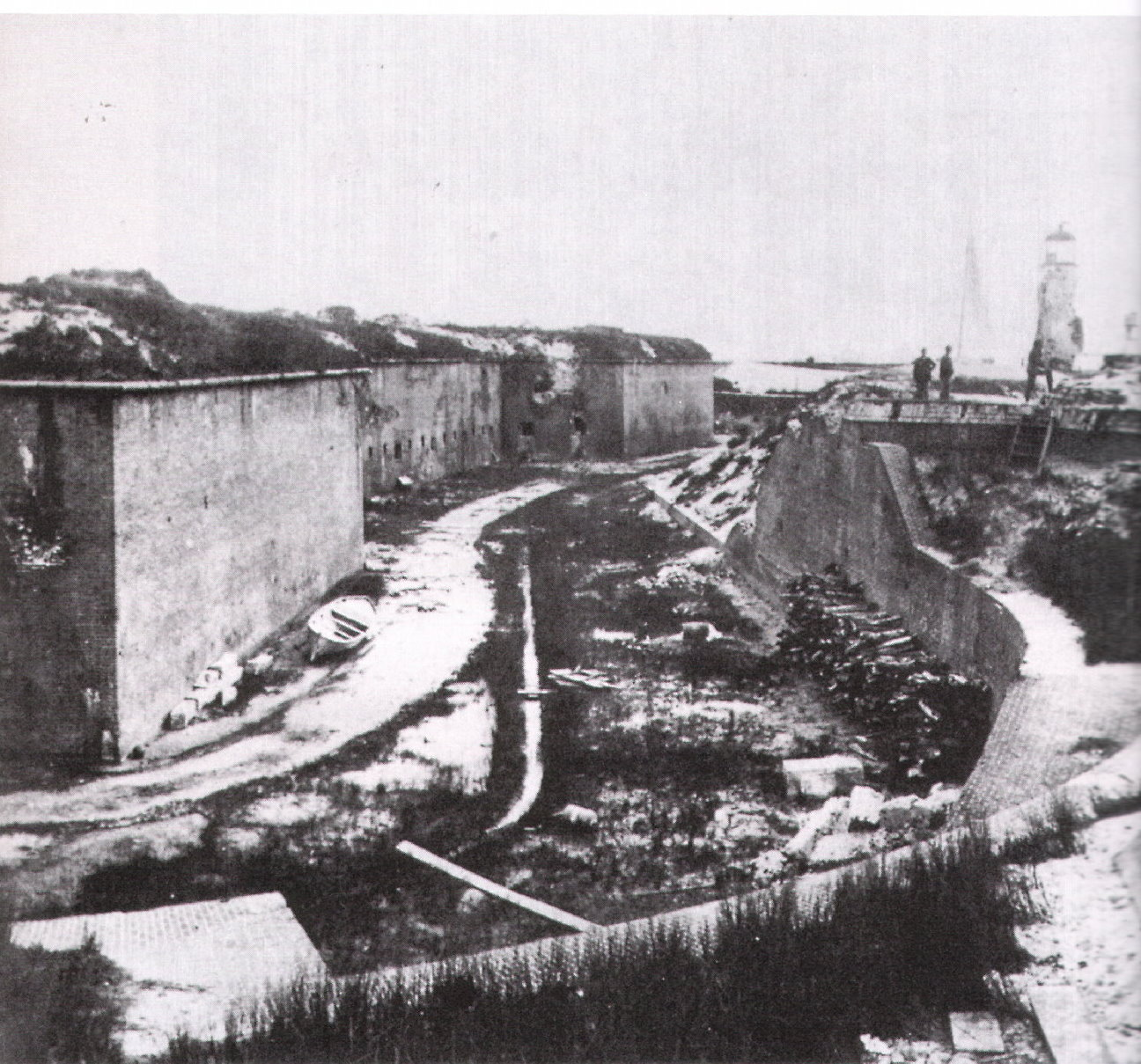
View of Fort Morgan in 1864, after its recapture.

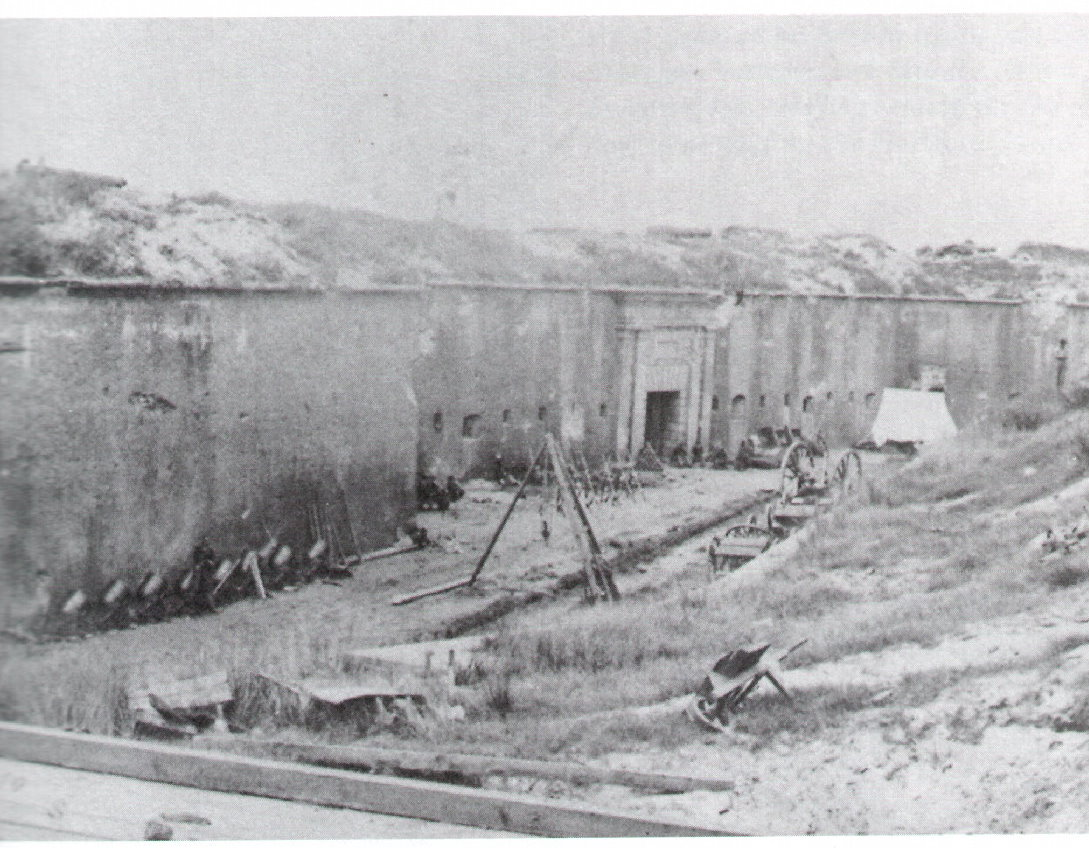
View of Fort Morgan in 1864.

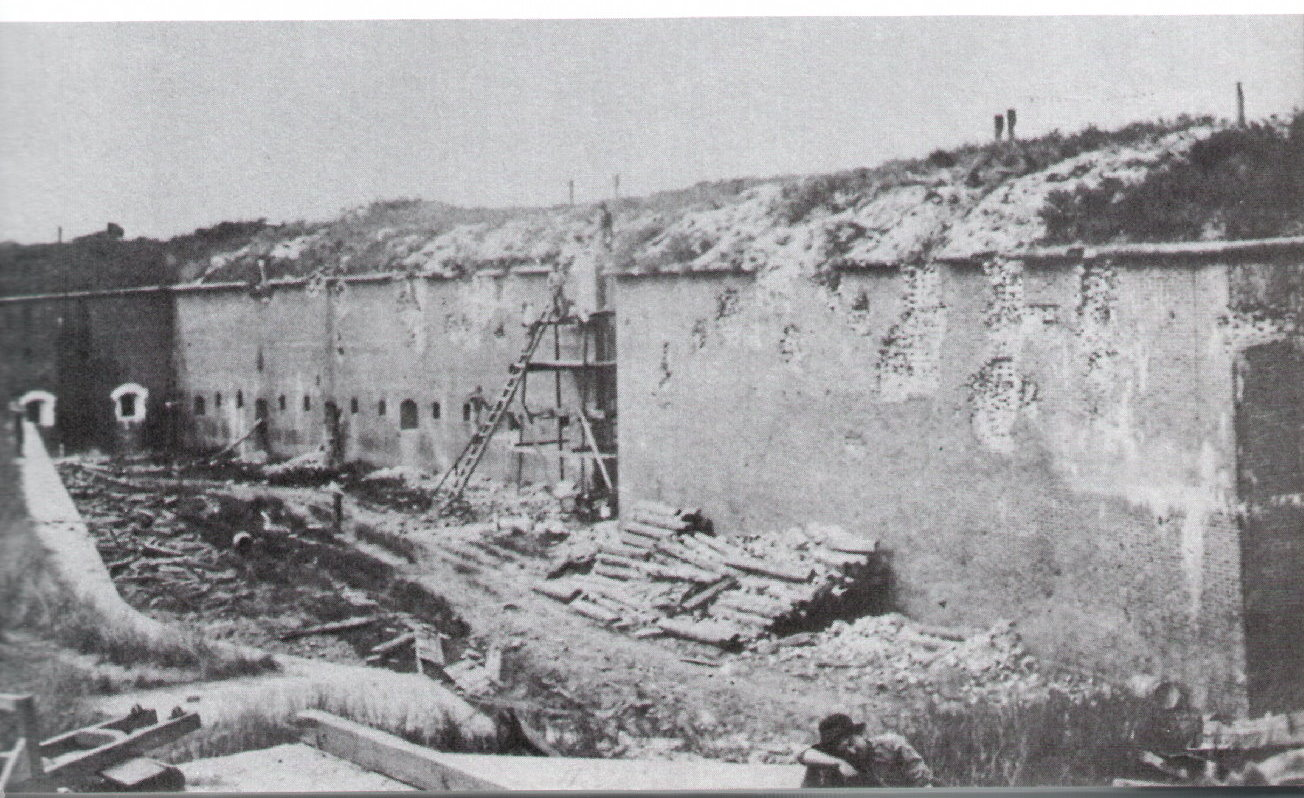
View of Fort Morgan in 1864.

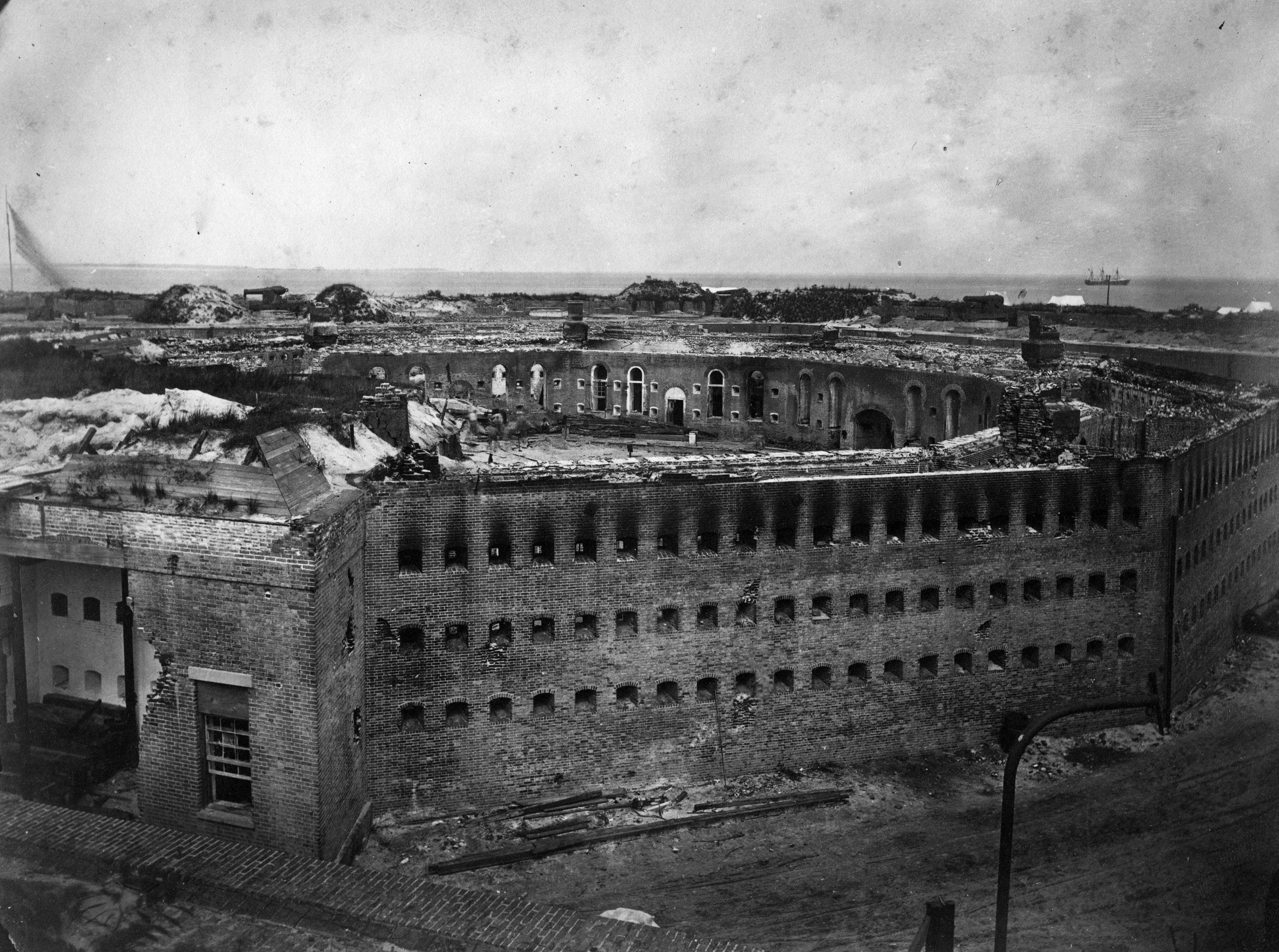
23 August 1864 - damage to the citadel.

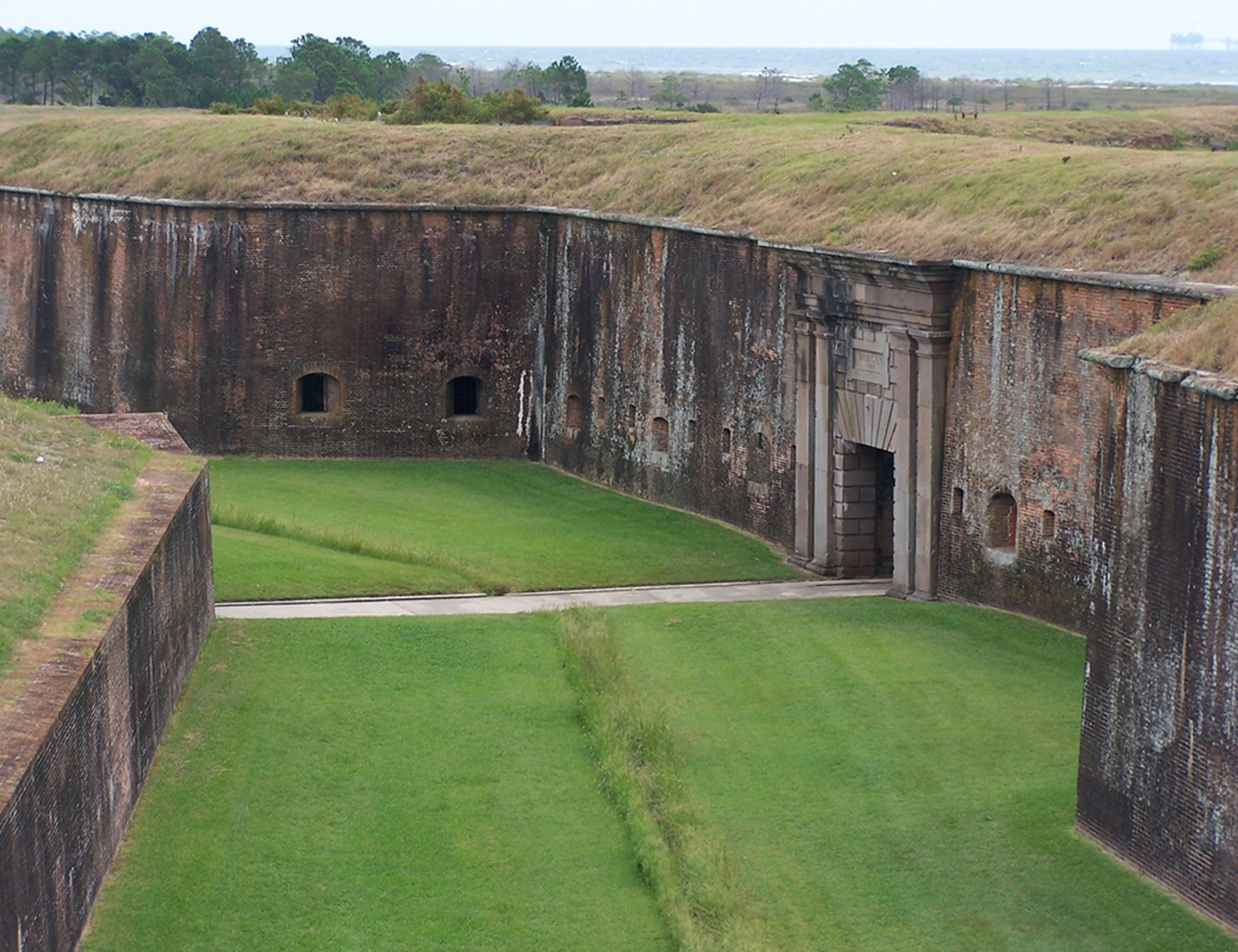
Fort Morgan in 2008.

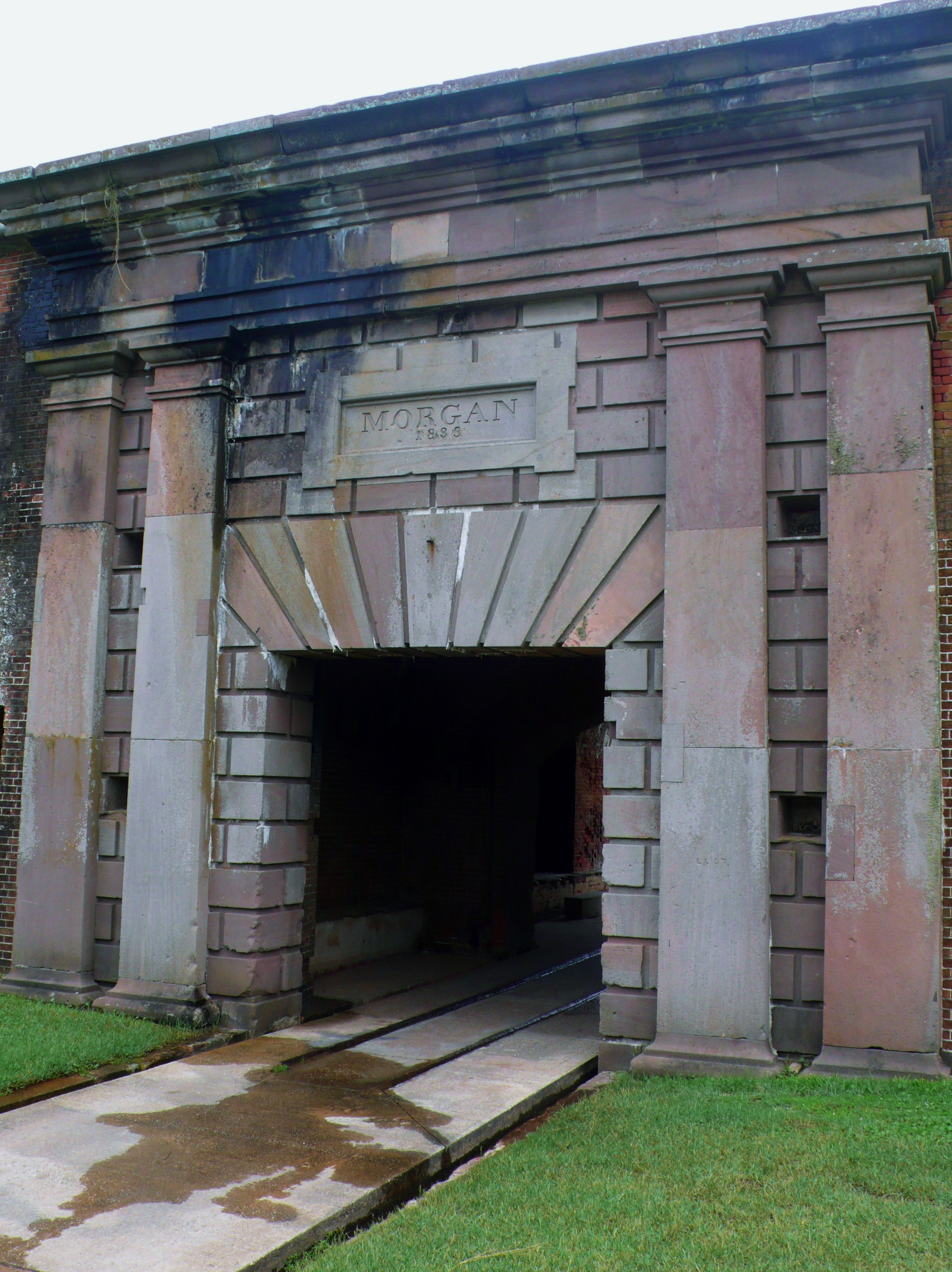
Entrance in 2008.

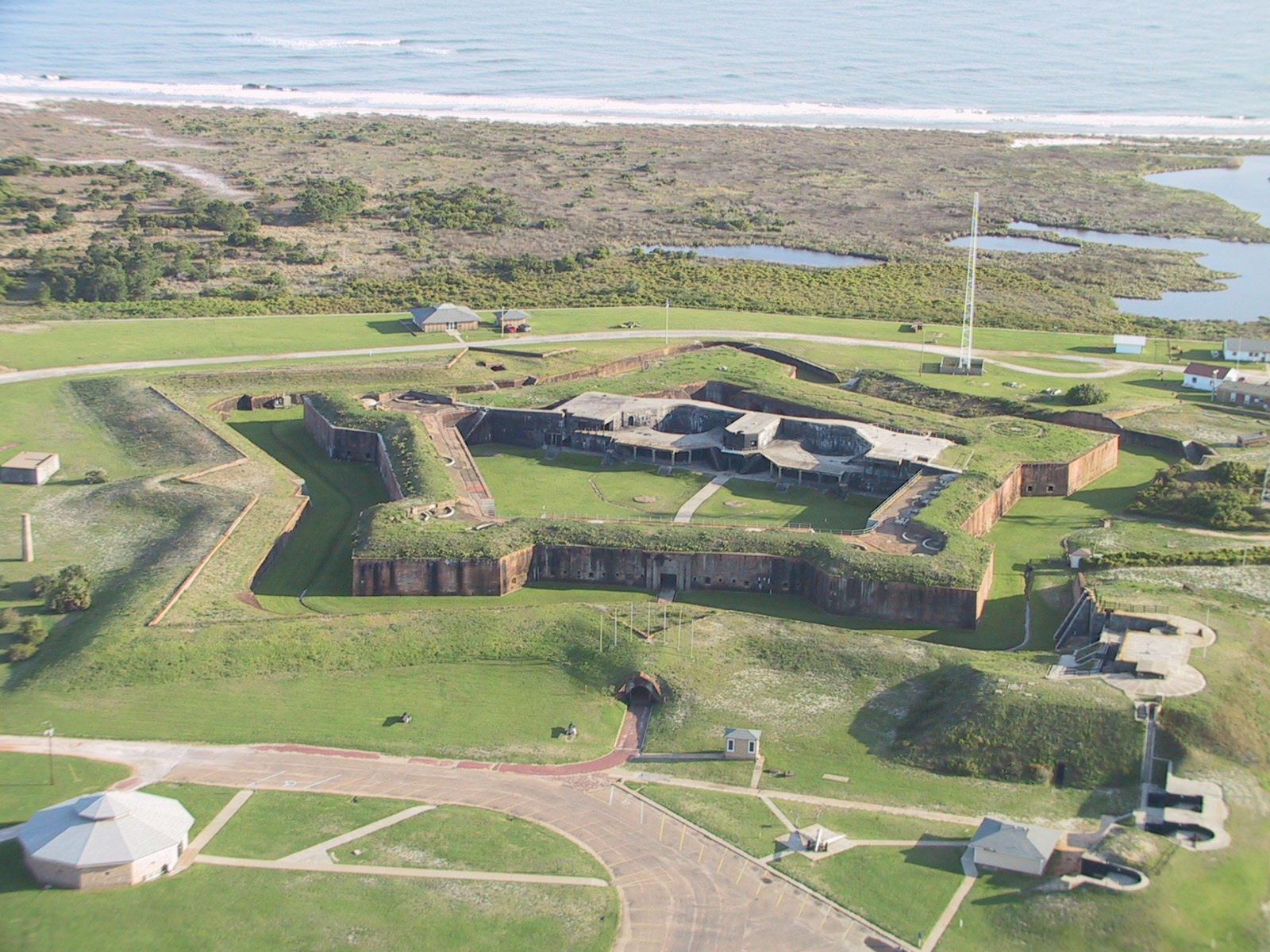
Fort Morgan, April 2002.

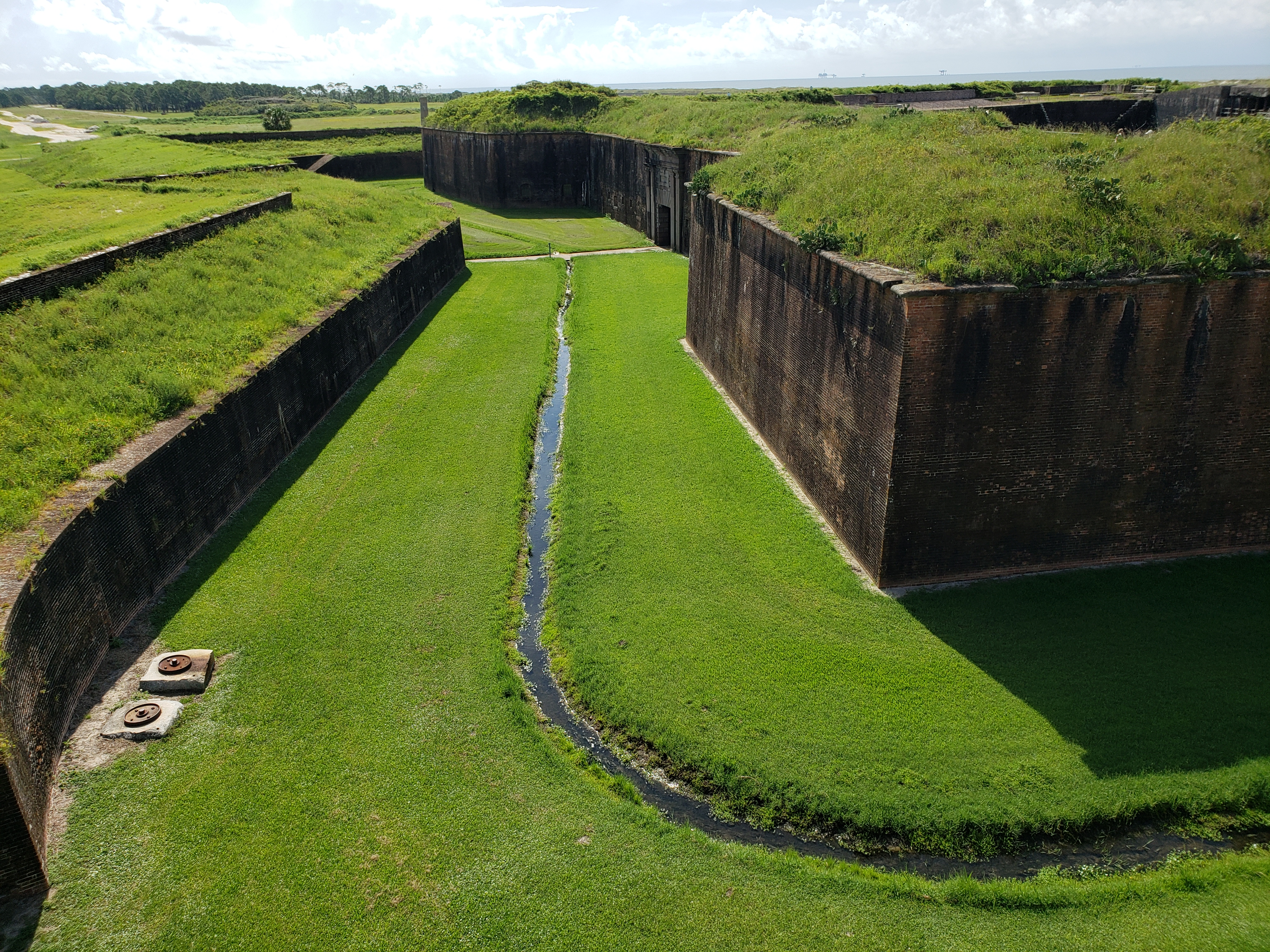
Fort Morgan, July 2024.

== See also ==
- List of National Historic Landmarks in Alabama
