= CSS Tennessee (1863) =

Ironclad warship built by the Confederate Navy

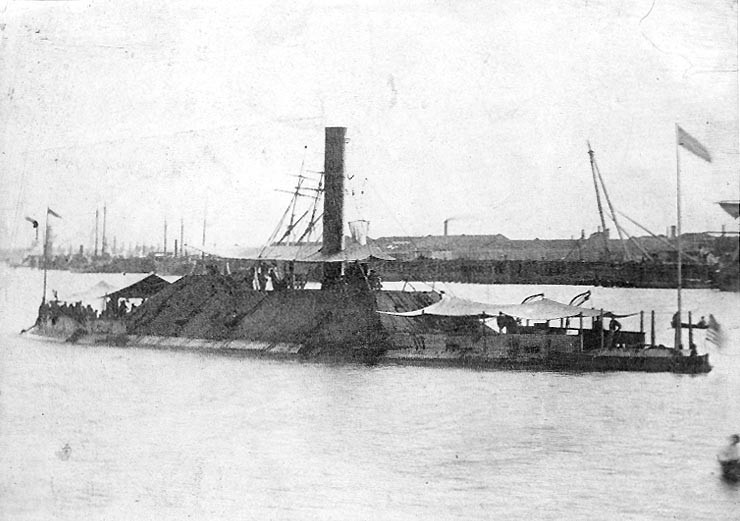
- USS Tennessee in 1865

History

Confederate States
- Name: Tennessee
- Namesake: State of Tennessee
- Builder: Henry D. Bassett
- Laid down: October 1862
- Launched: February 1863
- Commissioned: 16 February 1864
- Captured: At the Battle of Mobile Bay, 5 August 1864

United States
- Name: Tennessee
- Acquired: 5 August 1864
- Commissioned: 5 August 1864
- Decommissioned: 19 August 1865
- Fate: Sold for scrap, 27 November 1867

General characteristics
- Type: Casemate ironclad
- Displacement: 1,273 long tons (1,293 t)
- Length: 209 ft (63.7 m)
- Beam: 48 ft (14.6 m)
- Draft: 14 ft (4.3 m)
- Installed power: 4 boilers
- Propulsion: 2 Shafts; 2 Steam engines
- Speed: 5 knots (9.3 km/h; 5.8 mph)
- Complement: 133 officers and enlisted men
- Armament: 2 × 7 in (178 mm) Brooke rifles; 4 × 6.4 in (163 mm) Brooke rifles; ram
- Armor: Casemate: 5–6 in (127–152 mm); Deck: 2 in (51 mm)

Service record
- Commanders: Lieutenant James D. Johnston
- Operations: Battle of Mobile Bay; Siege of Fort Morgan

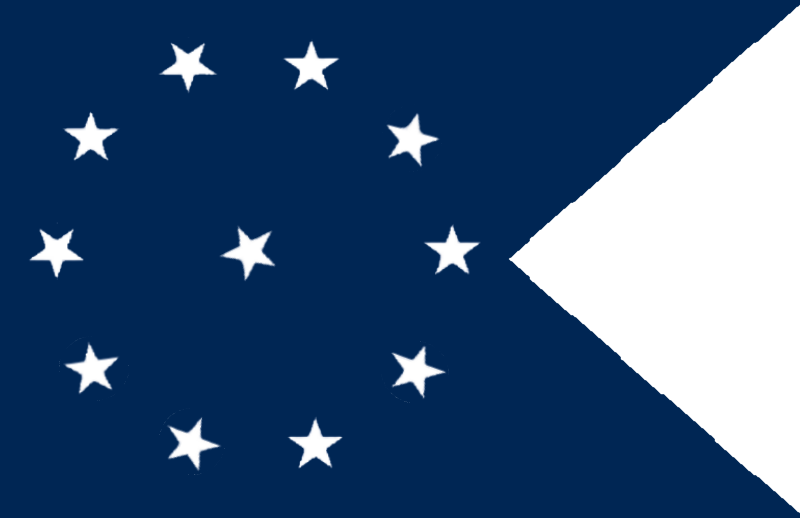
The Pennant of Admiral Franklin Buchanan, flown from the CSS Tennessee

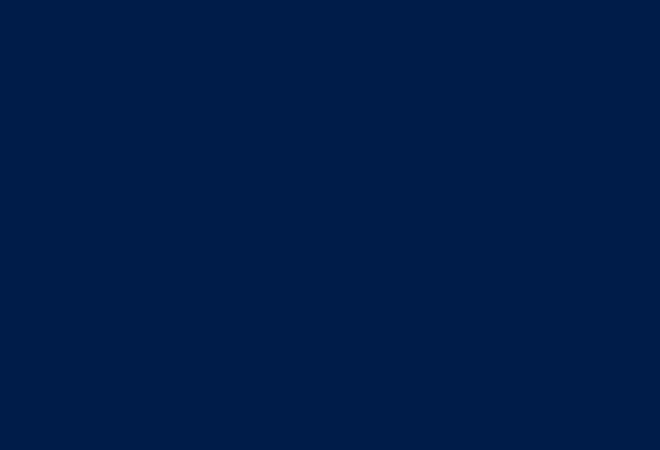
Admiral's Rank flag of Admiral Buchanan, similarly flown from the CSS Tennessee

CSS Tennessee was a casemate ironclad ram built for the Confederate Navy during the American Civil War. She served as the flagship of Admiral Franklin Buchanan (who would later be captured in the same ship), commander of the Mobile Squadron, after her commissioning. She was captured in 1864 by the Union Navy during the Battle of Mobile Bay and then participated in the Union's subsequent Siege of Fort Morgan. Tennessee was decommissioned after the war and sold in 1867 for scrap.

== Design, description and construction ==
Tennessee was built at Selma, Alabama, where she was commissioned on February 16, 1864. CSS Baltic towed her to Mobile, where she was fitted out.

Tennessee was laid down in October 1862, hull and other woodwork turned out by Henry D. Bassett, who launched her the following February, ready for towing to Mobile to be engined and armed. Her steam plant came from the steamer USS Alonzo Child. Her casemate design differed materially from CSS Columbia and CSS Texas, but the iron plate was the same 2 by 10 in (50 by 250 mm) as used on CSS Huntsville and CSS Tuscaloosa but triple thickness instead of double; her iron plate was made by the Shelby Iron Company in Shelby, Alabama. A fearsome detail of her defensive armament was a "hot water attachment to her boilers for repelling boarders, throwing one water stream from forward of the casemate and one aft."

The vicissitudes implicit in creating such an ironclad are graphically conveyed by Admiral Franklin Buchanan, writing September 20, 1863 to Confederate Navy Secretary Stephen Mallory:

The work on the Tennessee has progressed for some weeks past, under Mr. Pierce, as fast as the means in his power would permit. There is much delay for want of plate and bolt iron. It was impossible to iron both sponsons at the same time, as the vessel had to be careened several feet to enable them to put the iron on. Even then several of the workmen were waist deep in the water to accomplish it — to careen her, large beams 12 feet (3.7 m) square had to be run out of her posts and secured, on which several tons of iron had to be placed, and during the progress of putting on the sponson iron the shield iron could not be put on. The work has been carried on night and day when it could be done advantageously. I visited the Nashville and Tennessee frequently and, to secure and control the services of the mechanics, I have had them all conscripted and detailed to work under my orders. Previously, they were very independent and stopped working when they pleased.

(Joseph Pierce, referred to above, was Acting Naval Constructor in the Mobile area.)

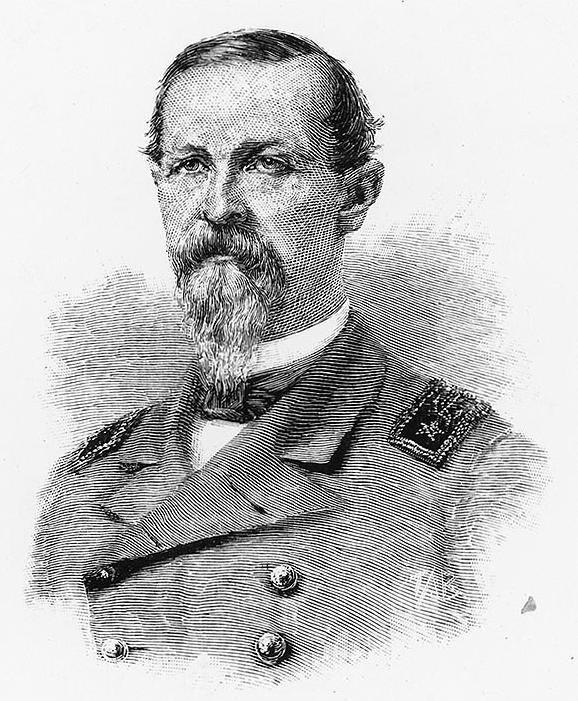
Lieutenant (later Commander) James D. Johnston, CSN, commander of CSS Tennessee

Tennessee became flagship of Admiral Buchanan, and served in action in the Battle of Mobile Bay on August 5, 1864. On that morning Tennessee and wooden gunboats CSS Gaines, CSS Morgan, and CSS Selma, steamed into combat against Admiral David G. Farragut's powerful fleet of four ironclad monitors and 14 wooden steamers. Unable to ram the Union ships because of their superior speed, Tennessee delivered a vigorous fire on the Federals at close range. The Confederate gunboats were sunk or dispersed. Farragut's fleet steamed up into the bay and anchored. Buchanan might have held Tennessee under the fort's protection but steamed after the Federal fleet and engaged despite overwhelming odds. The ram became the target for the entire Union fleet. Tennessee was rammed by several ships, and her vulnerable steering chains (which, oddly, lay in exposed trenches on the after deck) were carried away by the heavy gunfire. Unable to maneuver, Tennessee was battered repeatedly by heavy solid shot from her adversaries. With two of her men killed, Admiral Buchanan and eight others wounded, and increasingly severe damage being inflicted on her, Tennessee was forced to surrender.

== USS Tennessee ==
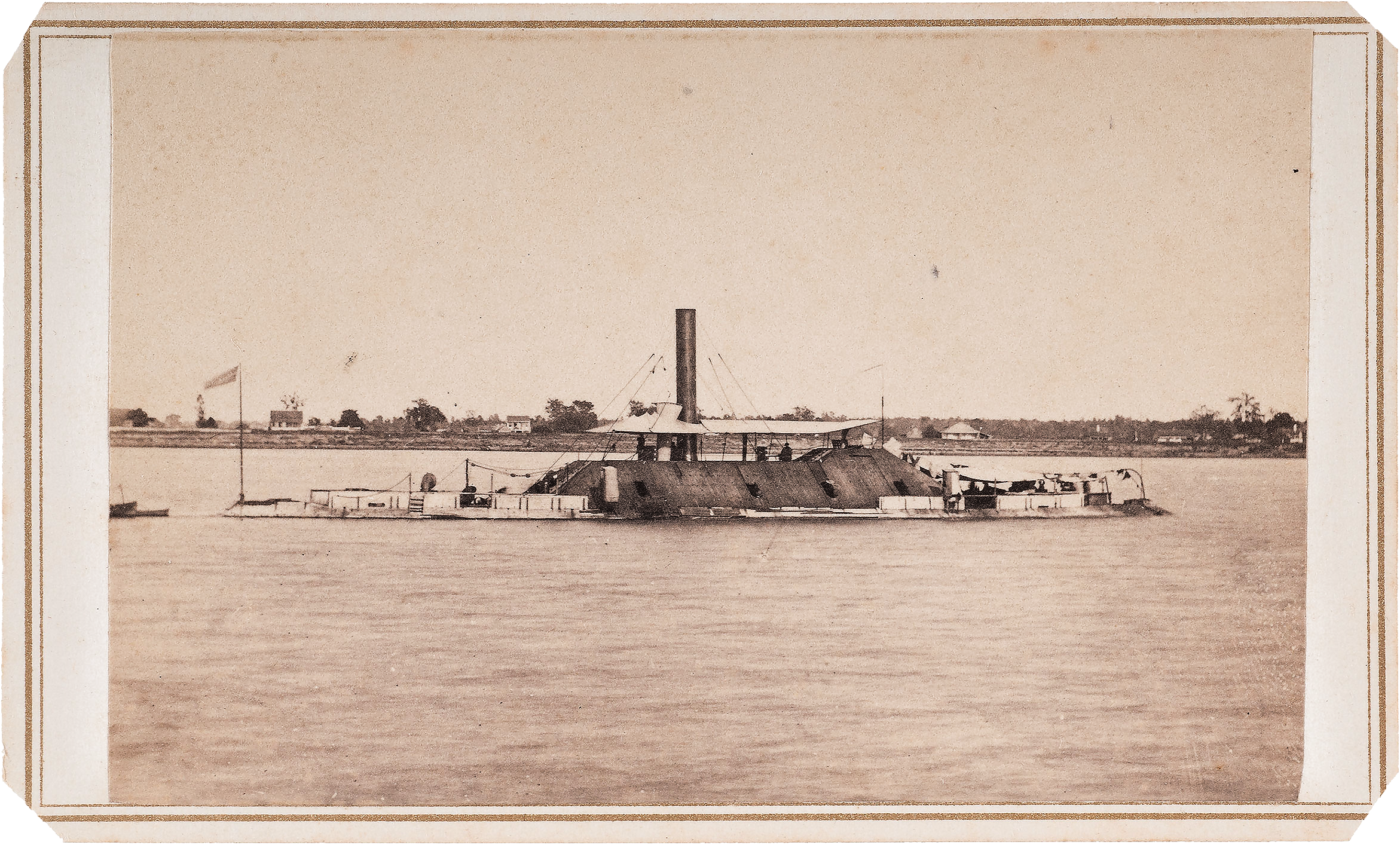
Carte de visite image of the ship

Immediately following her capture and repair, Tennessee was commissioned in the United States Navy, Acting Volunteer Lieutenant Pierre Giraud in command. The ironclad participated in the Federal assault on Fort Morgan on August 23 which resulted in the fort's capitulation that same day. That autumn, she moved from Mobile, Alabama, to New Orleans, Louisiana, for repairs before joining the Mississippi Squadron. She served on the Mississippi River through the end of the war in April 1865 and briefly thereafter. On August 19, 1865, Tennessee was placed out of commission and was laid up at New Orleans. There, she remained until November 27, 1867, when she was sold at auction to J. F. Armstrong for scrapping. Though the remainder of the vessel was scrapped, two 7-inch Brooke rifles and two 6.4-inch Brooke rifles were preserved and are still on display in the Old weapons exhibit in East Willard Park at the Washington Navy Yard, Washington, D.C. One of her 6.4-inch (160 mm) double-banded Brooke rifled cannon is on display at the headquarters of the Commander-in-Chief U. S. Atlantic Command at the Norfolk, Virginia, Naval base. One of her 7-inch Brooke rifles is on display at the city hall of Selma, Alabama, where it was cast.

== See also ==
- List of captured ships in the American Civil War
- Bibliography of American Civil War naval history

Media related to CSS Tennessee (ship, 1863) at Wikimedia Commons
