= List of foreign-born Medal of Honor recipients =

The Medal of Honor was created during the American Civil War and is the highest military decoration presented by the United States government to a member of its armed forces. The recipient must have distinguished themselves at the risk of their own life above and beyond the call of duty in action against an enemy of the United States. Due to the nature of this medal, it is commonly presented posthumously.

Although Medals of Honor can be awarded only to members of the U.S. armed forces, being a U.S. citizen is not a prerequisite for eligibility to receive the medal. Since the American Civil War, hundreds of people born outside the United States have received the medal, the most recent of these recipients being Pedro Cano and Jesus S. Duran who received their medals in March 2014 for actions performed during World War II and the Vietnam War respectively. The large number of foreign-born recipients during the 19th and early 20th centuries was mostly due to immigration waves from Europe.

== American Civil War (A-M) ==
This with the * indicates that the Medal of Honor was awarded posthumously

Image	Name	Country of birth	Rank	Branch	Place of action	Date of action	Notes/Reference
	Michael Aheam	Ireland	Paymaster's Steward	Navy	Cherbourg, France	June 19, 1864	
	Frederick Alber	Germany	Private	Army	Spotsylvania Courthouse, Virginia	May 12, 1864	
	James Allen	Ireland	Private	Army	South Mountain, Maryland	September 14, 1862	
	Robert Anderson	Ireland	Quartermaster	Navy	On board USS Crusader and USS Keokuk	1863	
	William J. Archinal	Germany	Corporal	Army	Vicksburg, Mississippi	May 22, 1863	
	Matthew Arther	Scotland, United Kingdom	Quartermaster	Navy	On board USS Carondelet	February 6–14, 1862	
	Charles Asten	Canada	Quarter Gunner	Navy	On board USS Signal	May 5, 1864	
	James Avery	Scotland, United Kingdom	Seaman	Navy	Mobile Bay, Alabama	August 5, 1864	
	Frederick Ballen	Germany	Private	Army	Vicksburg, Mississippi	May 3, 1863	
	Augustus Barry	Ireland	Sergeant Major	Army		1863–1865	
	David L. Bass	Ireland	Seaman	Navy	Fort Fisher, North Carolina	January 15, 1865	
	Philip Baybutt	England, United Kingdom	Private	Army	Luray, Virginia	September 24, 1864	
	Philip Bazaar	Chile	Ordinary Seaman	Navy	Fort Fisher, North Carolina	January 15, 1865	
	Jean J. Beaufort	France	Corporal	Army	Port Hudson, Louisiana	May 20, 1863	
	Richard Beddows	England, United Kingdom	Private	Army	Spotsylvania Courthouse, Virginia	May 18, 1864	
	John P. Beech	England, United Kingdom	Sergeant	Army	Spotsylvania Courthouse, Virginia	May 12, 1864	
	Terrence Begley	Ireland	Sergeant	Army	Cold Harbor, Virginia	June 3, 1864	
	George H. Bell	England, United Kingdom	Captain of the Afterguard	Navy	Galveston Bay	November 7, 1861	
	Charles Bieger	Germany	Private	Army	Ivy Farm, Mississippi	February 22, 1864	
	William R. D. Blackwood	Ireland	Surgeon	Army	Petersburg, Virginia	April 2, 1865	
	William Blagheen	England, United Kingdom	Ship's Cook	Navy	Mobile Bay, Alabama	August 5, 1864	
	Charles Blucher	Germany	Corporal	Army	Fort Harrison, Virginia	September 29, 1864	
	Frank Bois	Canada	Quartermaster	Navy	Vicksburg, Mississippi	May 27, 1863	
	Nicholas Boquet	Germany	Private	Army	Battle of Wilson's Creek, Missouri	August 10, 1861	
	Thomas Bourne	England, United Kingdom	Seaman	Navy	On board USS Varuna	April 24, 1862	
	Charles Bradley	Ireland	Boatswain's Mate	Navy	On board USS Louisville	January 10–11, 1863	
	Thomas W. Bradley	England, United Kingdom	Sergeant	Army	Chancellorsville, Virginia	May 3, 1863	
	Felix Brannigan	Ireland	Private	Army	Chancellorsville, Virginia	May 2, 1863	
	Christopher Brennan	Ireland	Seaman	Navy	On board USS Mississippi	April 24–25, 1862	
	Andrew Brinn	Scotland, United Kingdom	Seaman	Navy	Port Hudson, Louisiana	March 14, 1863	
	August F. Bronner	Germany	Private	Army	Battle of White Oak Swamp and Malvern Hill, Virginia	June 30–July 1, 1862	
	John Brosnan	Ireland	Sergeant	Army	Petersburg, Virginia	June 17, 1864	
	Edward Brown, Jr.	Ireland	Corporal	Army	Fredericksburg, Virginia	May 3–4, 1863	
	John Brown	Scotland, United Kingdom	Captain of the Forecastle	Navy	Mobile Bay, Alabama	August 5, 1864	Born as Thomas Hayes
	John Harties Brown	Canada	Captain	Army	Franklin, Tennessee	November 30, 1864	
	Robert Brown	Norway	Captain of the Top	Navy	Mobile Bay, Alabama	August 5, 1864	
	Denis Buckley*	Canada	Private	Army	Battle of Peachtree Creek, Georgia	July 20, 1864	
	James H. Burbank	Netherlands	Sergeant	Army	Blackwater River, Virginia	October 3, 1862	
	Joseph Burger	Austria	Private	Army	Nolensville, Tennessee	February 15, 1863	
	E. Michael Burk	England, United Kingdom	Private	Army	Spotsylvania Courthouse, Virginia	May 12, 1864	
	Thomas Burke	Ireland	Private	Army	Hanover Courthouse, Virginia	June 30, 1863	
	Albert Burton	England, United Kingdom	Seaman	Navy	Fort Fisher, North Carolina	January 15, 1865	
	James Byrnes	Ireland	Boatswain's Mate	Navy	On board USS Louisville	January 10–11, 1863	
	William Campbell	Ireland	Private	Army	Vicksburg, Mississippi	May 22, 1863	
	Hugh Carey	Ireland	Sergeant	Army	Gettysburg, Pennsylvania	July 2, 1863	
	John J. Carter	Ireland	Second Lieutenant	Army	Antietam, Maryland	September 17, 1862	
	Orlando E. Caruana	Malta	Private	Army	New Bern, North Carolina and South Mountain, Maryland	March 14 and September 14, 1862	
	David P. Casey	Ireland	Private	Army	Cold Harbor, Virginia	June 3, 1864	
	Michael Cassidy	Ireland	Landsman	Navy	Mobile Bay, Alabama	August 5, 1864	
	Ovila Cayer	Canada	Private	Army	Second Battle of the Weldon Railroad, Virginia	August 19, 1864	
	John Chapman	France	Private	Army	Battle of Sayler's Creek, Virginia	April 6, 1865	Born as Charles Felix Kauffman
	Louis G. Chaput	Canada	Landsman	Navy	Mobile Bay, Alabama	August 5, 1864	
	Robert J. Coffey	Canada	Sergeant	Army	Battle of Salem Church, Virginia	May 4, 1863	
	Abraham Cohn	Germany	Sergeant Major	Army	Wilderness, Virginia and Petersburg, Virginia	May 6 and July 30, 1864	
	Patrick Colbert	Ireland	Coxswain	Navy	Plymouth, North Carolina	October 31, 1864	
	Charles H. T. Collis	Ireland	Colonel	Army	Petersburg, Virginia	December 13, 1862	
	Sam Collyer	France	First Sergeant	Army	Petersburg, Virginia	July 30, 1864	Born as Walter Jamieson
	Martin Conboy	Ireland	Sergeant	Army	Williamsburg, Virginia	May 5, 1862	
	Thomas Connor	Ireland	Ordinary Seaman	Navy	Fort Fisher, North Carolina	January 15, 1865	
	James Connors	Ireland	Private	Army	Battle of Fisher's Hill, Virginia	September 22, 1864	
	John H. Cook	England, United Kingdom	Sergeant	Army	Pleasant Hill, Louisiana	April 9, 1864	
	John L. M. Cooper	Ireland	Coxswain	Navy	Mobile Bay, Alabama; Mobile, Alabama	August 5, 1864; April 26, 1865	Double MOH recipient
	Thomas E. Corcoran	Ireland	Landsman	Navy	Vicksburg, Mississippi	May 27, 1863	
	Richard H. Cosgriff	Ireland	Private	Army	Columbus, Georgia	April 16, 1865	
	Thomas Cosgrove	Ireland	Private	Army	Drewry's Bluff, Virginia	May 15, 1864	
	John Creed	Ireland	Private	Army	Battle of Fisher's Hill, Virginia	September 22, 1864	
	James E. Croft	England, United Kingdom	Private	Army	Allatoona, Georgia	October 5, 1864	
	Thomas Cullen	Ireland	Corporal	Army	Battle of Bristoe Station, Virginia	October 14, 1863	
	Richard J. Curran	Ireland	Assistant Surgeon	Army	Antietam, Maryland	September 17, 1862	
	Andrew Davidson	Scotland, United Kingdom	First Lieutenant	Army	Petersburg, Virginia	July 30, 1864	
	Joseph Davis	Wales, United Kingdom	Corporal	Army	Franklin, Tennessee	November 30, 1864	
	Thomas Davis	Wales, United Kingdom	Private	Army	Battle of Sayler's Creek, Virginia	April 6, 1865	
	John C. Delaney	England, United Kingdom	Sergeant	Army	Battle of Dabney's Mill, Virginia	February 6, 1865	
	John Dempster	Scotland, United Kingdom	Coxswain	Navy	Fort Fisher, North Carolina	December 24–25, 1864 and January 13–15, 1865	
	Luigi P. di Cesnola	Italy	Colonel	Army	Aldie, Virginia	June 17, 1863	
	David Dickie	Scotland, United Kingdom	Sergeant	Army	Vicksburg, Mississippi	May 22, 1863	
	Hubert Dilger	Germany	Captain	Army	Chancellorsville, Virginia	May 2, 1863	
	Robert F. Dodd	Canada	Private	Army	Petersburg, Virginia	July 30, 1864	
	Edward E. Dodds	Canada	Sergeant	Army	Ashby Gap, Virginia	July 19, 1864	
	John C. Donnelly	England, United Kingdom	Ordinary Seaman	Navy	Mobile Bay, Alabama	August 5, 1864	
	Timothy Donoghue	Ireland	Private	Army	Fredericksburg, Virginia	December 13, 1862	
	Patrick H. Doody	Ireland	Corporal	Army	Cold Harbor, Virginia	June 7, 1864	
	William Doolen	Ireland	Coal Heaver	Navy	Mobile Bay, Alabama	August 5, 1864	
	George H. Dore	England, United Kingdom	Sergeant	Army	Gettysburg, Pennsylvania	July 3, 1863	
	August Dorley	Germany	Private	Army	Mount Pleasant, Alabama	April 11, 1865	
	Allan H. Dougall	Scotland, United Kingdom	First Lieutenant	Army	Battle of Bentonville, North Carolina	March 19, 1865	
	Michael Dougherty	Ireland	Private	Army	Jefferson, Virginia	October 12, 1863	
	Patrick Dougherty	Ireland	Landsman	Navy	Mobile Bay, Alabama	August 5, 1864	
	Henry Dow	Scotland, United Kingdom	Boatswain's Mate	Navy	Vicksburg, Mississippi	May 27, 1863	
	William Downey	Ireland	Private	Army	Ashepoo River, South Carolina	May 24, 1864	
	James Drury	Ireland	Sergeant	Army	First Battle of the Weldon Railroad, Virginia	June 23, 1864	
	Richard D. Dunphy	Ireland	Coal Heaver	Navy	Mobile Bay, Alabama	August 5, 1864	
	David Edwards	Wales, United Kingdom	Private	Army	Battle of Five Forks, Virginia	April 1, 1865	
	William Ellis	England, United Kingdom	First Sergeant	Army	Dardanelle, Arkansas	January 14, 1865	
	Richard Enderlin	Germany	Musician	Army	Gettysburg, Pennsylvania	July 1–3, 1863	
	Edmund English	Ireland	First Sergeant	Army	Wilderness, Virginia	May 6, 1864	
	John P. Erickson	Sweden	Captain of the Forecastle	Navy	Fort Fisher, North Carolina	December 24, 1864 and January 22, 1865	
	Thomas Evans	Wales, United Kingdom	Private	Army	Piedmont, Virginia	June 5, 1864	
	Thomas T. Fallon	Ireland	Private	Army	Williamsburg, Virginia; Battle of Fair Oaks, Virginia; Big Shanty, Georgia	May 5, 1862; May 30–31, 1862; June 14–15, 1864	
	John M. Farquhar	Scotland, United Kingdom	Sergeant Major	Army	Battle of Stones River, Tennessee	December 31, 1862	
	Frank E. Fesq	Germany	Private	Army	Petersburg, Virginia	April 2, 1865	
	Thomas Fitzpatrick	Canada	Coxswain	Navy	Mobile Bay, Alabama	August 5, 1864	
	Thomas Flood	Ireland	Cabin boy	Navy	On board USS Pensacola	April 24–25, 1862	
	Christopher Flynn	Ireland	Sergeant	Army	Gettysburg, Pennsylvania	July 3, 1863	
	George W. Ford	Ireland	First Lieutenant	Army	Battle of Sayler's Creek, Virginia	April 6, 1865	
	Frederick W. Fout	Germany	Second Lieutenant	Army	Harpers Ferry, West Virginia	September 15, 1862	
	Henry Fox	Germany	Sergeant	Army	Jackson, Tennessee	December 23, 1862	
	Joseph Frantz	France	Private	Army	Vicksburg, Mississippi	May 22, 1863	
	William W. Fraser	Scotland, United Kingdom	Private	Army	Vicksburg, Mississippi	May 22, 1863	
	Martin Freeman	Scotland, United Kingdom	Civilian Pilot	Navy	Mobile Bay, Alabama	August 5, 1864	
	Franz Frey	Switzerland	Corporal	Army	Vicksburg, Mississippi	May 22, 1863	
	Frederick Füger	Germany	Sergeant	Army	Gettysburg, Pennsylvania	July 3, 1863	
	Richard Gasson*	Ireland	Sergeant	Army	Battle of Chaffin's Farm, Virginia	September 29, 1864	
	William Gardner	Ireland	Seaman	Navy	Mobile Bay, Alabama	August 5, 1864	
	William Garrett	Isle of Man	Sergeant	Army	Nashville, Tennessee	December 16, 1864	
	William Garvin	Canada	Captain of the Forecastle	Navy	Fort Fisher, North Carolina	December 23, 1864	
	Nicholas Geschwind	France	Captain	Army	Vicksburg, Mississippi	May 22, 1863	
	John C. Gilmore	Canada	Major	Army	Fredericksburg, Virginia	May 3, 1863	
	Patrick Ginley	Ireland	Private	Army	Second Battle of Ream's Station, Virginia	August 25, 1864	
	Joseph Gion	France	Private	Army	Chancellorsville, Virginia	May 2, 1863	
	George Green	England, United Kingdom	Corporal	Army	Missionary Ridge, Tennessee	November 25, 1863	
	Ignatz Gresser	Germany	Corporal	Army	Antietam, Maryland	September 17, 1862	
	James H. Gribben	Ireland	First Lieutenant	Army	Battle of Sayler's Creek, Virginia	April 6, 1865	
	John Griffiths	Wales, United Kingdom	Captain of the Forecastle	Navy	Fort Fisher, North Carolina	January 15, 1865	
	George Grueb	Germany	Private	Army	Battle of Chaffin's Farm, Virginia	September 29, 1864	
	Asel Hagerty	Canada	Private	Army	Battle of Sayler's Creek, Virginia	April 6, 1865	
	Henry A. Hammel	Germany	Sergeant	Army	Battle of Grand Gulf, Mississippi	April 28–29, 1863	
	John H. Harbourne	England, United Kingdom	Private	Army	Petersburg, Virginia	June 17, 1864	
	John Harris	Scotland, United Kingdom	Captain of the Forecastle	Navy	Mobile Bay, Alabama	August 5, 1864	
	John H. Havron	Ireland	Sergeant	Army	Petersburg, Virginia	April 2, 1865	
	Joseph C. Hibson	England, United Kingdom	Private	Army	Fort Wagner, South Carolina	July 13–18, 1863	
	Thomas J. Higgins	Canada	Sergeant	Army	Vicksburg, Mississippi	May 22, 1863	
	Patrick Highland	Ireland	Corporal	Army	Petersburg, Virginia	April 2, 1865	
	James Hill	England, United Kingdom	First Lieutenant	Army	Battle of Champion Hill, Mississippi	May 16, 1863	
	Heinrich Hoffman	Germany	Corporal	Army	Battle of Sayler's Creek, Virginia	April 6, 1865	
	Michael C. Horgan	Ireland	Landsman	Navy	Plymouth, North Carolina	October 31, 1864	
	Samuel B. Horne	Ireland	Captain	Army	Fort Harrison, Virginia	September 29, 1864	
	George L. Houghton	Canada	Private	Army	Elk River (Tennessee), Tennessee	July 2, 1863	
	Peter Howard	France	Boatswain's Mate	Navy	On board USS Mississippi	March 14, 1863	
	Michael Hudson	Ireland	Sergeant	Marine Corps	Mobile Bay, Alabama	August 5, 1864	
	Thomas W. Hyde	Italy	Major	Army	Antietam, Maryland	September 17, 1862	Born to American parents
	Joseph Irlam	England, United Kingdom	Seaman	Navy	Mobile Bay, Alabama	August 5, 1864	
	Francis Irsch	Germany	Captain	Army	Gettysburg, Pennsylvania	July 1, 1863	
	Thomas Irving	England, United Kingdom	Coxswain	Navy	Charleston Harbor, South Carolina	November 16, 1863	
	Nicholas Irwin	Denmark	Seaman	Navy	Mobile Bay, Alabama	August 5, 1864	
	James Jardine	Scotland, United Kingdom	Sergeant	Army	Vicksburg, Mississippi	May 22, 1863	
	Thomas Jenkins	Australia	Seaman	Navy	Vicksburg, Mississippi	May 27, 1863	
	James T. Jennings	England, United Kingdom	Private	Army	Second Battle of the Weldon Railroad, Virginia	August 20, 1864	
	William F. John	Germany	Private	Army	Vicksburg, Mississippi	May 22, 1863	
	Henry Johnson	Norway	Seaman	Navy	Mobile Bay, Alabama	August 5, 1864	
	John Johnson	Norway	Private	Army	Fredericksburg, Virginia	December 13, 1862	
	Andrew Jones	Ireland	Chief Boatswain's Mate	Navy	Mobile Bay, Alabama	August 5, 1864	
	Luther Kaltenbach	Germany	Corporal	Army	Nashville, Tennessee	December 16, 1864	
	Peter Kappesser	Germany	Private	Army	Lookout Mountain, Tennessee	November 24, 1863	
	John Kane	Ireland	Corporal	Army	Petersburg, Virginia	April 2, 1865	
	Leopold Karpeles	Czech Republic	Sergeant	Army	Wilderness, Virginia	May 6, 1864	
	August Kauss	Germany	Corporal	Army	Battle of Five Forks, Virginia	April 1, 1865	
	Joseph Keele	Ireland	Sergeant Major	Army	Battle of North Anna, Virginia	May 23, 1864	
	Joseph Keene	England, United Kingdom	Private	Army	Fredericksburg, Virginia	December 13, 1862	
	Barnett Kenna	England, United Kingdom	Quartermaster	Navy	Mobile Bay, Alabama	August 5, 1864	
	John Kennedy	Ireland	Private	Army	Battle of Trevilian Station, Virginia	June 11, 1864	
	Thomas R. Kerr	Ireland	Captain	Army	Moorefield, West Virginia	August 7, 1864	
	Henry Klein	Germany	Private	Army	Battle of Sayler's Creek, Virginia	April 6, 1865	
	Joseph S. Labill	France	Private	Army	Vicksburg, Mississippi	May 22, 1863	
	Bartlett Laffey	Ireland	Seaman	Navy	Yazoo City, Mississippi	March 5, 1864	
	Julius Langbein	Germany	Musician	Army	Vicksburg, Mississippi	April 19, 1862	
	Pierre Leon	France	Captain of the Forecastle	Navy	Yazoo River, Mississippi	December 23–27, 1862	
	Frank Leslie	England, United Kingdom	Private	Army	Front Royal, Virginia	August 15, 1864	
	Adolphe Libaire	France	Captain	Army	Antietam, Maryland	September 17, 1862	
	Benjamin Lloyd	England, United Kingdom	Coal Heaver	Navy	On board USS Wyalusing	May 25, 1864	
	Hugh Logan	Scotland, United Kingdom	Captain of the Forecastle	Navy	On board USS Rhode Island	December 30, 1862	
	John Lonergan	Ireland	Captain	Army	Gettysburg, Pennsylvania	July 2, 1863	
	William Lord	England, United Kingdom	Musician	Army	Drewry's Bluff, Virginia	May 16, 1864	
	William Ludgate	England, United Kingdom	Captain	Army	Farmville, Virginia	April 7, 1865	
	Carl Ludwig	Germany	Private	Army	Petersburg, Virginia	June 18, 1864	His MOH citation lists his country of birth as France
	James Machon	England, United Kingdom	Cabin boy	Navy	Mobile Bay, Alabama	August 5, 1864	
	Alexander Mack	Netherlands	Captain of the Top	Navy	Mobile Bay, Alabama	August 5, 1864	
	Michael Madden	Ireland	Private	Army	Mason's Island, Maryland	September 3, 1861	
	William Madden	England, United Kingdom	Coal Heaver	Navy	Mobile Bay, Alabama	August 5, 1864	
	Harry J. Mandy	England, United Kingdom	First Sergeant	Army	Front Royal, Virginia	August 15, 1864	
	Richard C. Mangam	Ireland	Private	Army	Battle of Hatcher's Run, Virginia	April 2, 1865	
	Edward S. Martin	Ireland	Quartermaster	Navy	Mobile Bay, Alabama	August 5, 1864	
	James Martin II	Ireland	Sergeant	Marine Corps	Mobile Bay, Alabama	August 5, 1864	
	William Martin	Germany	Boatswain's Mate	Navy	Yazoo River, Mississippi	December 27, 1862	
	William Martin	Ireland	Seaman	Navy	On board USS Varuna	April 24, 1862	
	Charles McAnally	Ireland	Second Lieutenant	Army	Spotsylvania Courthouse, Virginia	May 12, 1864	
	Patrick H. McEnroe	Ireland	Sergeant	Army	Winchester, Virginia	September 19, 1864	
	Owen McGough	Ireland	Corporal	Army	First Battle of Bull Run, Virginia	July 21, 1861	
	John McGowan	Ireland	Quartermaster	Navy	On board USS Varuna	April 24, 1862	
	James McIntosh	Canada	Captain of the Top	Navy	Mobile Bay, Alabama	August 5, 1864	
	Geogre McKee	Ireland	Color Sergeant	Army	Petersburg, Virginia	April 2, 1865	
	James McLeod	Scotland, United Kingdom	Captain of the Foretop	Navy	On board USS Pensacola	April 24–25, 1862	
	Martin T. McMahon	Canada	Captain	Army	Battle of White Oak Swamp, Virginia	June 30, 1862	
	John P. McVeane*	Canada	Corporal	Army	Fredericksburg, Virginia	May 4, 1863	
	Thomas Meagher	Scotland, United Kingdom	First Sergeant	Army	Battle of Chaffin's Farm, Virginia	September 29, 1864	
	Andrew Miller	Germany	Sergeant	Marine Corps	Mobile Bay, Alabama	August 5, 1864	
	Henry A. Miller	Germany	Captain	Army	Fort Blakeley, Alabama	April 9, 1865	
	James Miller	Denmark	Quartermaster	Navy	Johns Island, South Carolina	December 25, 1863	
	John Miller	Germany	Private	Army	Waynesboro, Virginia	March 2, 1865	Born as Henry Fey
	George W. Mindil	Germany	Captain	Army	Williamsburg, Virginia	May 5, 1862	
	Hugh Molloy	Ireland	Ordinary Seaman	Navy	Harrisonburg, Louisiana	March 2, 1864	
	John G. Morrison	Ireland	Coxswain	Navy	On board USS Carondelet	July 15, 1862	
	Charles E. Morse	France	Sergeant	Army	Wilderness, Virginia	May 5, 1864	
	St. Clair A. Mulholland	Ireland	Major	Army	Chancellorsville, Virginia	May 4–5, 1863	
	Patrick Mullen	Ireland	Boatswain's Mate	Navy	On board USS Wyandank; On board USS Don	March 17, 1865; May 1, 1865	Double MOH recipient
	Charles J. Murphy	England, United Kingdom	First Lieutenant	Army	First Battle of Bull Run, Virginia	July 21, 1861	
	Dennis Murphy	Ireland	Sergeant	Army	Corinth, Mississippi	October 3, 1862	
	Michael C. Murphy	Ireland	Lieutenant Colonel	Army	Battle of North Anna, Virginia	May 24, 1864	
	Patrick Murphy	Ireland	Boatswain's Mate	Navy	Mobile Bay, Alabama	August 5, 1864	

== American Civil War (N-Z) ==
This with the * indicates that the Medal of Honor was awarded posthumously

Image	Name	Country of birth	Rank	Branch	Place of action	Date of action	Notes/Reference
	Christopher Nugent	Ireland	Sergeant	Marine Corps	On board USS Fort Henry	June 15, 1863	
	James R. O'Beirne	Ireland	Captain	Army	Battle of Seven Pines, Virginia	May 31 – June 1, 1862	
	Peter O'Brien	Ireland	Private	Army	Waynesboro, Virginia	March 2, 1865	
	Thomas O'Connell	Ireland	Coal Heaver	Navy	Mobile Bay, Alabama	August 5, 1864	
	Albert O'Connor	Canada	Sergeant	Army	Battle of Hatcher's Run, Virginia	March 31 – April 1, 1865	
	John O'Dea	Ireland	Private	Army	Vicksburg, Mississippi	May 22, 1863	
	Menomen O'Donnell	Ireland	First Lieutenant	Army	Vicksburg, Mississippi and Fort DeRussy, Louisiana	May 22, 1863 and March 14, 1864	
	Paul A. Oliver	At sea (English Channel)	Captain	Army	Resaca, Georgia	May 15, 1864	
	David Orbansky	Poland	Private	Army	Shiloh, Tennessee and Vicksburg, Mississippi	April 1862 and 1863	
	John Ortega	Spain	Seaman	Navy	On board USS Saratoga	1864	
	Albert Oss	Belgium	Private	Army	Chancellorsville, Virginia	May 3, 1863	
	Joachim Pease	Canada	Seaman	Navy	On board USS Kearsarge	June 19, 1864	
	William R. Pelham	Canada	Landsman	Navy	Mobile Bay, Alabama	August 5, 1864	
	William Phinney	Norway	Boatswain's Mate	Navy	Mobile Bay, Alabama	August 5, 1864	
	Frederick Phisterer	Germany	First Lieutenant	Army	Battle of Stones River, Tennessee	December 31, 1862	
	George C. Platt	Ireland	Private	Army	Fairfield, Pennsylvania	July 3, 1863	
	George H. Plowman	England, United Kingdom	Sergeant Major	Army	Petersburg, Virginia	June 17, 1864	
	Thomas Plunkett	Ireland	Sergeant	Army	Fredericksburg, Virginia	December 11, 1862	
	William H. Powell	Wales, United Kingdom	Major	Army	Sinking Ceek Valley, Virginia	November 26, 1862	
	George Prance	France	Captain of the Main Top	Navy	Fort Fisher, North Carolina	December 24–25, 1864 and January 13–15, 1865	
	John Preston	Ireland	Landsman	Navy	Mobile Bay, Alabama	August 5, 1864	
	George Pyne	England, United Kingdom	Seaman	Navy	St. Marks, Florida	March 5–6, 1865	
	James Quinlan	Ireland	Major	Army	Savage's Station, Virginia	June 29, 1862	
	John Rannahan	Ireland	Corporal	Marine Corps	Fort Fisher, North Carolina	January 15, 1865	
	Charles A. Read	Sweden	Coxswain	Navy	On board USS Kearsarge	June 19, 1864	
	George Reynolds	Ireland	Private	Army	Winchester, Virginia	September 19, 1864	
	Carlos H. Rich	Canada	First Sergeant	Army	Wilderness, Virginia	May 5, 1864	
	James S. Roantree	Ireland	Sergeant	Marine Corps	Mobile Bay, Alabama	August 5, 1864	
	Charles Robinson	Scotland, United Kingdom	Boatswain's Mate	Navy	Yazoo River, Mississippi	December 23–27, 1862	
	Peter J. Ryan	Ireland	Private	Army	Winchester, Virginia	September 19, 1864	
	Martin E. Scheibner	Russia	Private	Army	Battle of Mine Run, Virginia	November 27, 1863	
	John Schiller	Germany	Private	Army	Battle of Chaffin's Farm, Virginia	September 29, 1864	Born as John Schilling
	Conrad Schmidt	Germany	First Sergeant	Army	Winchester, Virginia	September 19, 1864	
	George Schutt	Ireland	Coxswain	Navy	St. Marks, Florida	March 5–6, 1865	
	Theodore Schwan	Germany	First Lieutenant	Army	Battle of Peebles' Farm, Virginia	October 1, 1864	
	Alexander Scott	Canada	Corporal	Army	Battle of Monocacy, Maryland	July 9, 1864	
	William J. Sewell	Ireland	Colonel	Army	Chancellorsville, Virginia	May 3, 1863	
	Charles Shambaugh	Germany	Corporal	Army	Battle of Glendale, Virginia	June 30, 1862	
	Hendrick Sharp	Spain	Seaman	Navy	Mobile Bay, Alabama	August 5, 1864	
	John Shilling	England, United Kingdom	First Sergeant	Army	Second Battle of the Weldon Railroad, Virginia	August 21, 1864	
	John Shivers	Canada	Private	Marine Corps	Fort Fisher, North Carolina	January 15, 1865	
	Charles J. Simons	India	Sergeant	Army	Petersburg, Virginia	July 30, 1864	
	Oloff Smith	Sweden	Coxswain	Navy	Mobile Bay, Alabama	August 5, 1864	
	Thomas Smith	England, United Kingdom	Seaman	Navy	St. Marks, Florida	March 5–6, 1865	
	William Smith	Ireland	Quartermaster	Navy	On board USS Kearsarge	January 15, 1865	
	Robert Sommers	Germany	Chief Quartermaster	Navy	On board USS Ticonderoga	January 15, 1865	
	Julius Stahel	Hungary	Major General	Army	Piedmont, Virginia	June 5, 1864	
	George H. Stockman	Germany	First Lieutenant	Army	Vicksburg, Mississippi	May 22, 1863	
	James Stoddard	Canada	Seaman	Navy	Yazoo City, Mississippi	March 5, 1864	
	Timothy Sullivan	Ireland	Coxswain	Navy	On board USS Louisville	1863	
	John Swanson	Sweden	Seaman	Navy	Fort Fisher, North Carolina	January 15, 1865	Born as Jacob Johnson
	James Sweeney	England, United Kingdom	Private	Army	Battle of Cedar Creek, Virginia	October 19, 1864	
	James Tallentine*	England, United Kingdom	Quarter Gunner	Navy	Plymouth, North Carolina	October 31, 1864	
	Joseph Taylor	England, United Kingdom	Private	Army	Second Battle of the Weldon Railroad, Virginia	August 18, 1864	
	Henry A. Thompson	England, United Kingdom	Private	Marine Corps	Fort Fisher, North Carolina	January 15, 1865	Born as Roderick P. Connelly
	J. Harry Thompson	England, United Kingdom	Surgeon	Army	New Bern, North Carolina	March 14, 1862	
	John M. Tobin	Ireland	First Lieutenant	Army	Malvern Hill, Virginia	July 1, 1862	
	William Toomer	Ireland	Sergeant	Army	Vicksburg, Mississippi	May 22, 1863	
	Ernst Torgler	Germany	Sergeant	Army	Battle of Ezra Church, Georgia	July 28, 1864	
	George Uhrl	Germany	Sergeant	Army	Battle of White Oak Swamp, Virginia	June 30, 1862	
	John Vale	England, United Kingdom	Private	Army	Nolensville, Tennessee	February 15, 1863	
	Victor Vifquain	Belgium	Lieutenant Colonel	Army	Fort Blakeley, Alabama	April 9, 1865	
	Ernest von Vegesack	Sweden	Major	Army	Battle of Gaines's Mill, Virginia	June 27, 1862	
	Maurice Wagg	England, United Kingdom	Coxswain	Navy	On board USS Rhode Island	December 30, 1862	
	John Walsh	Ireland	Corporal	Army	Battle of Cedar Creek, Virginia	October 19, 1864	
	Martin Wambsgan	Germany	Private	Army	Battle of Cedar Creek, Virginia	October 19, 1864	
	Thomas M. Wells	Ireland	Chief Bugler	Army	Battle of Cedar Creek, Virginia	October 19, 1864	
	William Wells	Germany	Quartermaster	Navy	Mobile Bay, Alabama	August 5, 1864	
	Edward Welsh	Ireland	Private	Army	Vicksburg, Mississippi	May 22, 1863	
	William Westerhold	Germany	Sergeant	Army	Spotsylvania Courthouse, Virginia	May 12, 1864	
	Patrick H. White	Ireland	Captain	Army	Vicksburg, Mississippi	May 22, 1863	
	Augustus Williams	Norway	Seaman	Navy	Fort Fisher, North Carolina	January 15, 1865	
	Peter Williams	Norway	Seaman	Navy	Hampton Roads, Virginia	March 9, 1862	
	William Williams	Ireland	Landsman	Navy	Charleston Harbor, South Carolina	November 16, 1863	
	Richard Willis	England, United Kingdom	Coxswain	Navy	Fort Fisher, North Carolina	December 24–25, 1864 and January 13–15, 1865	
	Mark Wood	England, United Kingdom	Private	Army	Great Locomotive Chase, Georgia	April 1862	
	John Woon	England, United Kingdom	Boatswain's Mate	Navy	Mississippi River, Mississippi	April 29, 1863	
	John L. Younker	Germany	Private	Army	Cedar Mountain, Virginia	August 9, 1862	

== Indian Wars ==
This with the * indicates that the Medal of Honor was awarded posthumously

Image	Name	Country of birth	Rank	Branch	Place of action	Date of action	Notes/Reference
	James Anderson	Canada	Private	Army	Near Wichita River, Texas	October 5, 1870	Born as James Anderson Smythe
	Richard Barrett	Ireland	First Sergeant	Army	Sycamore Canyon, Arizona	May 23, 1872	
	James J. Bell	Ireland	Private	Army	Big Horn, Montana	July 9, 1876	
	Frederick Bergendahl	Sweden	Private	Army	Staked Plains, Texas	December 8, 1874	
	Frank Bratling*	Germany	Corporal	Army	Fort Selden, New Mexico	July 8, 1873 – July 11, 1873	
	James Brogan	Ireland	Sergeant	Army	Simon Valley, Arizona	December 14, 1877	
	Oscar Burkard	Germany	Private	Army	Near Leech Lake, Minnesota	October 5, 1898	
	Edmond Butler	Ireland	Captain	Army	Wolf Mountains, Montana	January 8, 1877	
	Denis Byrne	Ireland	Sergeant	Army	Cedar Creek, Montana	October 1876 – January 1877	
	Thomas J. Callan	Ireland	Private	Army	Little Bighorn, Montana	June 25, 1876 – June 26, 1876	
	John Connor	Ireland	Corporal	Army	Near Wichita River, Texas	July 12, 1870	
	William Evans	Ireland	Private	Army	Big Horn, Montana	July 9, 1876	
	Henry Falcott	France	Sergeant	Army	Arizona Territory	August – October 1868	
	Daniel Farren	Ireland	Private	Army	Arizona Territory	August – October 1868	
	James Fegan	Ireland	Sergeant	Army	Plum Creek, Kansas	March 1868	
	Hermann Fichter	Germany	Private	Army	Whetstone Mountains, Arizona	May 5, 1871	
	John H. Foley	Ireland	Sergeant	Army	Near Platte River, Nebraska	April 26, 1872	
	Nicholas Foran	Ireland	Private	Army	Arizona Territory	August – October 1868	
	William Foster	England, United Kingdom	Sergeant	Army	Near Red River, Texas	September 29, 1872	
	Christopher Freemeyer	Germany	Private	Army	Cedar Creek, Montana	October 21, 1876 – January 8, 1877	
	Charles Gardner	Germany	Private	Army	Arizona Territory	August – October 1868	Born as Simon Suhler
	Thomas H. Gay	Canada	Private	Army	Arizona Territory	August – October 1868	
	Frederick W. Gerber	Germany	Sergeant Major	Army		1839–1871	Awarded the Medal of Honor for his entire career, rather than a single action
	Albert Glawinski	Germany	Private	Army	Near Powder River, Montana	March 17, 1876	
	Patrick Golden	Ireland	Sergeant	Army	Arizona Territory	August – October 1868	
	John Green	Germany	Major	Army	Lava Beds, California	January 17, 1873	
	Mathew H. Hamilton	Scotland, United Kingdom	Private	Army	Wounded Knee Creek, South Dakota	December 29, 1890	
	Mosher A. Harding	Canada	Blacksmith	Army	Chiricahua Mountains, Arizona	October 20, 1869	
	George Hobday	England, United Kingdom	Private	Army	Wounded Knee Creek, South Dakota	December 29, 1890	Born as Stephen John Hobday
	Henry Hogan	Ireland	First Sergeant	Army	Cedar Creek, Montana; Bear Paw Mountains, Montana	October 1876 – January 8, 1877; September 30, 1877	Double MOH recipient
	Bernard J. D. Irwin	Ireland	Assistant Surgeon	Army	Apache Pass, Arizona	February 13, 1861 – February 14, 1861	
	John James	England, United Kingdom	Corporal	Army	Near Washita River, Texas	September 9, 1874 – September 11, 1874	
	Bernhard Jetter	Germany	Sergeant	Army	South Dakota	December 1890	
	John Keenan	Ireland	Private	Army	Arizona Territory	August – October 1868	
	John Kilmartin	Canada	Private	Army	Whetstone Mountains, Arizona	May 5, 1871	
	Albert Knaak	Switzerland	Private	Army	Arizona Territory	August – October 1868	File:Albert Knaak and Medal of Honor recipient "Indian Wars" in section 2, grave 101. at Fort Meade National Cemetery, Old Stone Road, Sturgis, Meade County, South Dakota (cropped).tif
	Wendelin Kreher*	Germany	First Sergeant	Army	Cedar Creek, Montana	October 21, 1876 – January 8, 1877	
	Patrick J. Leonard	Ireland	Sergeant	Army	Little Blue, Nebraska	May 15, 1870	
	Patrick T. Leonard	Ireland	Corporal	Army	Near Fort Hartsuff, Nebraska	April 26, 1876	
	Thomas Little	Barbados	Bugler	Army	Arizona Territory	August – October 1868	
	Herbert Mahers	Canada	Private	Army	Seneca Mountain, Arizona	August 25, 1869	
	Gregory Mahoney	Wales, United Kingdom	Private	Army	Near Red River, Texas	September 26, 1874 – September 28, 1874	
	John May	Germany	Sergeant	Army	Near Washita River, Texas	July 12, 1870	
	Bernard McCann*	Ireland	Private	Army	Cedar Creek, Montana	October 21, 1876 – January 8, 1877	
	Michael M. McCarthy	Canada	First Sergeant	Army	White Bird Canyon, Idaho	June 1876 – January 1877	
	George H. Morgan	Canada	Second Lieutenant	Army	Big Dry Fork, Arizona	July 17, 1882	Born to an American mother
	Jeremiah J. Murphy	Ireland	Private	Army	Near Powder River, Montana	March 17, 1876	
	Adam Neder	Germany	Private	Army	South Dakota	December 1890	
	Henry Newman	Germany	First Sergeant	Army	Whetstone Mountains, Arizona	July 13, 1872	
	John Nihill	Ireland	Private	Army	Whetstone Mountains, Arizona	July 13, 1872	
	Richard J. Nolan	Ireland	Farrier	Army	Near White Clay Creek, South Dakota	December 30, 1890	
	Moses Orr	Ireland	Private	Army	Arizona Territory	Winter of 1872/1873	
	John F. O'Sullivan	Ireland	Private	Army	Staked Plains, Texas	December 8, 1874	
	William R. Parnell	Ireland	First Lieutenant	Army	White Bird Canyon, Idaho	June 17, 1877	
	Isaac Payne	Mexico	Trumpeter	Army	Near Pecos River, Texas	April 25, 1875	Born to Black Seminoles
	James Pym	England, United Kingdom	Private	Army	Little Bighorn, Montana	June 25, 1876	
	Theodore Ragnar	Sweden	First Sergeant	Army	Near White Clay Creek, South Dakota	December 30, 1890	
	Henry Rodenburg	Germany	Private	Army	Cedar Creek, Montana	October 21, 1876 – January 8, 1877	
	Patrick Rogan	Ireland	Sergeant	Army	Big Hole, Montana	August 9, 1877	
	Stanislaus Roy	France	Sergeant	Army	Little Bighorn, Montana	June 25, 1876	
	John Schnitzer	Germany	Wagoner	Army	Horseshoe Canyon, New Mexico	April 22, 1882	
	Julius Schou	Denmark	Corporal	Army		1876	
	Rudolph Stauffer	Switzerland	First Sergeant	Army	Near Camp Hualpai, Arizona	May – November 1872	
	Christian Steiner	Germany	Private	Army	Chiricahua Mountains, Arizona	October 20, 1869	
	Julius H. Stickoffer	Switzerland	Saddler	Army	Cienega Springs, Utah	November 11, 1868	
	James Sumner	England, United Kingdom	Private	Army	Chiricahua Mountains, Arizona	October 20, 1869	
	John Thompson	Scotland, United Kingdom	Sergeant	Army	Chiricahua Mountains, Arizona	October 20, 1869	
	Peter Thompson	Scotland, United Kingdom	Private	Army	Little Bighorn, Montana	June 25, 1876	
	John Tracy	Ireland	Private	Army	Chiricahua Mountains, Arizona	October 20, 1869	Born as Henry G. Nabers
	Jacob Trautman	Germany	First Sergeant	Army	Wounded Knee Creek, South Dakota	December 29, 1890	
	Ernest Veuve	Switzerland	Sergeant	Army	Staked Plains, Texas	November 3, 1874	
	Otto Voit	Germany	Saddler	Army	Little Bighorn, Montana	June 25, 1876	
	Rudolph von Medem	Germany	Sergeant	Army	Arizona Territory	1872–1873	
	Paul H. Weinert	Germany	Corporal	Army	Wounded Knee Creek, South Dakota	December 29, 1890	
	Jacob Widmer	Germany	First Sergeant	Army	Near Milk River, Colorado	September 29, 1879	
	Henry Wilkens	Germany	First Sergeant	Army	Little Muddy Creek, Montana and Camas Meadows, Idaho	May 7, 1877 and August 20, 1877	
	Charles Windolph	Germany	Private	Army	Little Bighorn, Montana	June 25, 1876 – June 26, 1876	
	George G. Wortman	Canada	Sergeant	Army	Arizona Territory	August – October 1868	
	Hermann Ziegner	Germany	Private	Army	South Dakota	December 29, 1890 – December 30, 1890	

== Korean Expedition ==
Image	Name	Country of birth	Rank	Branch	Place of action	Date of action	Notes/Reference
	John Coleman	Ireland	Private	Marine Corps	On board USS Colorado	June 11, 1871	
	James Dougherty	Ireland	Private	Marine Corps	On board USS Benicia	June 11, 1871	
	Patrick H. Grace	Ireland	Chief Quartermaster	Navy	On board USS Benicia	June 10, 1871 – June 11, 1871	
	William F. Lukes	Bohemia	Landman	Navy	Ganghwa Island, Korea	June 9, 1871 – June 10, 1871	
	Alexander McKenzie	Scotland, United Kingdom	Boatswain's Mate	Navy	On board USS Colorado	June 11, 1871	
	Michael McNamara	Ireland	Private	Marine Corps	On board USS Benicia	June 11, 1871	
	James F. Merton	England, United Kingdom	Landman	Navy	Ganghwa Island, Korea	June 9, 1871 – June 10, 1871	
	Samuel F. Rogers	Canada	Quartermaster	Navy	On board USS Colorado	June 11, 1871	

== Spanish–American War ==
Image	Name	Country of birth	Rank	Branch	Place of action	Date of action	Notes/Reference
	Albert Beyer	Germany	Coxswain	Navy	Cienfuegos, Cuba	May 11, 1898	
	George F. Brady	Ireland	Chief Gunner's Mate	Navy	Cardenas, Cuba	May 11, 1898	
	Daniel J. Campbell	Canada	Private	Marine Corps	Cienfuegos, Cuba	May 11, 1898	
	Joseph E. Carter	England, United Kingdom	Blacksmith	Navy	Cienfuegos, Cuba	May 11, 1898	
	Thomas Cavanaugh	Ireland	Fireman First Class	Navy	Bahamas	November 14, 1898	
	Claus K. R. Clausen	Denmark	Coxswain	Navy	Santiago de Cuba	June 2, 1898	
	Thomas C. Cooney	Ireland	Chief Machinist	Navy	Cardenas, Cuba	May 11, 1898	
	John Davis	Germany	Gunner's Mate Third Class	Navy	Cienfuegos, Cuba	May 11, 1898	
	Thomas M. Doherty	Ireland	Corporal	Army	Santiago de Cuba	July 1, 1898	
	John Eglit	Finland	Seaman	Navy	Cienfuegos, Cuba	May 11, 1898	
	Nick Erickson	Finland	Coxswain	Navy	Cienfuegos, Cuba	May 11, 1898	
	John Fitzgerald	Ireland	Private	Marine Corps	Cuzco, Cuba	June 14, 1898	
	Philip Gaughan	Ireland	Sergeant	Marine Corps	Cienfuegos, Cuba	May 11, 1898	
	Michael Gibbons	Ireland	Oiler	Navy	Cienfuegos, Cuba	May 11, 1898	
	Henry Hendrickson	Germany	Seaman	Navy	Cienfuegos, Cuba	May 11, 1898	
	Franz A. Itrich	Germany	Chief Carpenter's Mate	Navy	Luzon, Philippines	May 1, 1898	
	Alexander Jardine	Scotland, United Kingdom	Fireman First Class	Navy	Bahamas	November 14, 1898	
	John P. Johanson	Sweden	Seaman	Navy	Cienfuegos, Cuba	May 11, 1898	
	Johan J. Johansson	Sweden	Ordinary Seaman	Navy	Cienfuegos, Cuba	May 11, 1898	
	Hans Johnsen	Norway	Chief Machinist	Navy	Cardenas, Cuba	May 11, 1898	
	Peter Johnson	England, United Kingdom	Fireman First Class	Navy	On board USS Vixen	May 28, 1898	
	Michael Kearney	Ireland	Private	Marine Corps	Cienfuegos, Cuba	May 11, 1898	
	Thomas Kelly	Ireland	Private	Army	Santiago de Cuba	July 1, 1898	
	Franz Kramer	Germany	Seaman	Navy	Cienfuegos, Cuba	May 11, 1898	
	Ernest Krause	Germany	Coxswain	Navy	Cienfuegos, Cuba	May 11, 1898	
	Hermann W. Kuchneister	Germany	Private	Marine Corps	Cienfuegos, Cuba	May 11, 1898	
	John Maxwell	Ireland	Fireman Second Class	Navy	Cienfuegos, Cuba	May 11, 1898	
	William Meyer	Germany	Carpenter's Mate Third Class	Navy	Cienfuegos, Cuba	May 11, 1898	
	Harry H. Miller	Canada	Seaman	Navy	Cienfuegos, Cuba	May 11, 1898	Brother of Willard Miller
	Willard Miller	Canada	Seaman	Navy	Cienfuegos, Cuba	May 11, 1898	Brother of Harry H. Miller
	Daniel Montague	Ireland	Chief Master-at-arms	Navy	Santiago de Cuba	June 2, 1898	
	William H. Morin	England, United Kingdom	Boatswain's Mate Second Class	Navy	Caimanera, Cuba	July 26, 1898 – July 27, 1898	
	Frederick Muller	Denmark	Boatswain's Mate Second Class	Navy	Manzanillo, Cuba	June 30, 1898	
	John E. Murphy	Ireland	Coxswain	Navy	Santiago de Cuba	June 2, 1898	
	Lauritz Nelson	Norway	Sailmaker's Mate	Navy	Cienfuegos, Cuba	May 11, 1898	
	William Oakley	England, United Kingdom	Gunner's Mate Second Class	Navy	Cienfuegos, Cuba	May 11, 1898	
	Anton Olsen	Norway	Ordinary Seaman	Navy	Cienfuegos, Cuba	May 11, 1898	
	George F. Phillips	Canada	Machinist First Class	Navy	Santiago de Cuba	June 2, 1898	
	Henry P. Russell	Canada	Landman	Navy	Cienfuegos, Cuba	May 11, 1898	
	William Spicer	England, United Kingdom	Gunner's Mate First Class	Navy	Caimanera, Cuba	July 26, 1898 – July 27, 1898	
	Edward Sullivan	Ireland	Corporal	Marine Corps	Cienfuegos, Cuba	May 11, 1898	
	Axel Sundquist	Finland	Chief Carpenter's Mate	Navy	Caimanera, Cuba	July 26, 1898 – July 27, 1898	
	Gustav A. Sundquist	Sweden	Ordinary Seaman	Navy	Cienfuegos, Cuba	May 11, 1898	
	Albert Vadas	Hungary	Seaman	Navy	Cienfuegos, Cuba	May 11, 1898	
	Bruno Wende	Germany	Private	Army	El Caney, Cuba	July 1, 1898	
	Julius A. R. Wilke	Germany	Boatswain's Mate First Class	Navy	Cienfuegos, Cuba	May 11, 1898	
	Frank Williams	Germany	Seaman	Navy	Cienfuegos, Cuba	May 11, 1898	

== Samoan Civil War ==
Image	Name	Country of birth	Rank	Branch	Place of action	Date of action	Notes/Reference
	Frederick T. Fisher	England, United Kingdom	Gunner's Mate First Class	Navy	Samoa	April 1, 1899	
	Bruno A. Forsterer	Germany	Sergeant	Marine Corps	Samoa	April 1, 1899	
	Henry L. Hulbert	England, United Kingdom	Private	Marine Corps	Samoa	April 1, 1899	

== Philippine–American War ==
This with the * indicates that the Medal of Honor was awarded posthumously

Image	Name	Country of birth	Rank	Branch	Place of action	Date of action	Notes/Reference
	Otto Boehler	Germany	Private	Army	Luzon, Philippines	May 16, 1899	
	Joseph Fitz	Austria	Ordinary Seaman	Navy	Sulu, Philippines	March 8, 1906	
	Gotfred Jensen	Denmark	Private	Army	Luzon, Philippines	May 13, 1899	
	Cornelius J. Leahy*	Ireland	Private	Army	Luzon, Philippines	September 3, 1899	
	José B. Nísperos	Philippines	Private	Army	Basilan, Philippines	September 24, 1911	
	Thomas Francis Prendergast	Ireland	Corporal	Marine Corps	Luzon, Philippines	March 25, 1899 – March 29, 1899 and April 5, 1899	
	Patrick Shanahan	Ireland	Chief Boatswain's Mate	Navy	Philippines	May 28, 1899	
	Thomas Sletteland	Norway	Private	Army	Luzon, Philippines	April 12, 1899	
	George E. Stewart	Australia	Second Lieutenant	Army	Panay, Philippines	November 26, 1899	
	Andrew V. Stoltenberg	Norway	Gunner's Mate Second Class	Navy	Samar, Philippines	July 16, 1900	
	Paul F. Straub	Germany	Surgeon	Army	Luzon, Philippines	December 21, 1899	
	William G. Thordsen	Germany	Coxswain	Navy	Leyte, Philippines	May 6, 1900	

== Boxer Rebellion ==
This with the * indicates that the Medal of Honor was awarded posthumously

Image	Name	Country of birth	Rank	Branch	Place of action	Date of action	Notes/Reference
	Edward G. Allen	Netherlands	Boatswain's Mate First Class	Navy	China	June 13, 1900 – June 22, 1900	
	James Cooney	Ireland	Private	Marine Corps	Tientsin, China	July 13, 1900	
	John O. Dahlgren	Sweden	Corporal	Marine Corps	Beijing, China	June 20, 1900 – July 16, 1900	
	Hans A. Hansen	Germany	Seaman	Navy	China	June 13, 1900 – June 22, 1900	
	Henry W. Heisch	Germany	Private	Marine Corps	Tientsin, China	June 20, 1900	
	Martin Hunt	Ireland	Private	Marine Corps	Beijing, China	June 20, 1900 – July 16, 1900	
	Joseph Killackey	Ireland	Landman	Navy	China	June 13, 1900 – June 22, 1900	
	Carl E. Petersen	Germany	Chief Machinist	Navy	Beijing, China	June 28, 1900 – August 17, 1900	
	William Seach	England, United Kingdom	Ordinary Seaman	Navy	China	June 13, 1900 – June 22, 1900	
	Peter Stewart	Scotland, United Kingdom	Gunnery Sergeant	Marine Corps	China	June 13, 1900 – June 22, 1900	
	Karl Thomas*	Germany	Coxswain	Navy	China	June 13, 1900 – June 22, 1900	
	Martin T. Torgerson	Norway	Gunner's Mate Third Class	Navy	China	June 13, 1900 – June 22, 1900	
	Robert H. Von Schlick	Germany	Private	Army	Tientsin, China	July 13, 1900	
	Edward A. Walker	Scotland, United Kingdom	Sergeant	Marine Corps	Beijing, China	June 20, 1900 – July 16, 1900	
	Axel Westermark	Finland	Seaman	Navy	Beijing, China	June 28, 1900 – August 17, 1900	

== Occupation of Veracruz ==
Image	Name	Country of birth	Rank	Branch	Place of action	Date of action	Notes/Reference
	Niels Drustrup	Denmark	Lieutenant	Navy	Veracruz, Mexico	April 21, 1914	
	John Grady	Canada	Lieutenant	Navy	Veracruz, Mexico	April 22, 1914	

== World War I ==
This with the * indicates that the Medal of Honor was awarded posthumously

Image	Name	Country of birth	Rank	Branch	Place of action	Date of action	Notes/Reference
Head and shoulders of a man in a neatly pressed military uniform with four medals hanging from ribbons on his chest and a garrison cap.	Jake Allex	Serbia	Corporal	Army	Chipilly, France	August 9, 1918	Born as Aleksa Mandušić
	Johannes S. Anderson	Finland	First Sergeant	Army	Consenvoye, France	October 8, 1918	
Head and torso of a man with neatly combed hair and a toothbrush mustache. He is wearing a dressy military uniform with an array of medals on his chest, a medal tightly around his neck, and shoulder cords.	Louis Cukela	Croatia	Sergeant	Marine Corps	Villers-Cotterêts, France	July 18, 1918	Born as Vjekoslav Lujo Cukela; double MOH recipient
	George Dilboy*	Ottoman Empire	Private First Class	Army	Belleau, France	July 18, 1918	
	George Price Hays	China	First Lieutenant	Army	Greves Farm, France	July 14, 1918 – July 15, 1918	Born to American parents
Head of a young man with thick, dark, hair parted at the side. He is wearing a military jacket with a high collar and bright buttons down the center.	Matej Kocak*	Slovakia	Sergeant	Marine Corps	Soissons, France	July 18, 1918	Double MOH recipient
published headshot	John C. Latham	England, United Kingdom	Sergeant	Army	Le Catelet, France	September 29, 1918	
	Berger Loman	Norway	Private	Army	Consenvoye, France	October 9, 1918	
	James I. Mestrovitch*	Montenegro	Sergeant	Army	Fismette, France	August 10, 1918	Born as Joko Meštrović
	John O. Siegel	Germany	Boatswain's Mate Second Class	Navy	Chesapeake Bay	November 1, 1918	
Head and shoulders of a middle-aged man, with receding hairline, in a dark turtleneck sweater.	Joseph H. Thompson	Ireland	Major	Army	Apremont, France	October 1, 1918	
	Michael Valente	Italy	Private	Army	Ronssoy, France	September 29, 1918	
Three-quarters frontal picture of a man in uniform wearing a metal helmet with 2nd Infantry Division insignia. The Medal of Honor, French Croix de guerre with two bronze palms and one silver star and Montenegrin Medal for Military Bravery are pinned to his uniform coat.	Ludovicus M. M. Van Iersel	Netherlands	Sergeant	Army	Mouzon, France	November 9, 1918	
	Reidar Waaler	Norway	Sergeant	Army	Ronssoy, France	September 27, 1918	

== World War II ==
This with the * indicates that the Medal of Honor was awarded posthumously

Image	Name	Country of birth	Rank	Branch	Place of action	Date of action	Notes/Reference
	Jose Calugas	Philippines	Sergeant	Army	Bataan, Philippines	January 16, 1942	Despite his birth in a US territory, he was classified as an immigrant due to the Tydings–McDuffie Act
	Pedro Cano*	Mexico	Private	Army	Schevenhütte, Germany	December 2, 1944 – December 3, 1944	
Man with army uniform looking at camera with tilted hat.	Robert Craig*	Scotland, United Kingdom	Second Lieutenant	Army	Sicily, Italy	July 11, 1943	Immigrated to United States with his family in 1923 at age 4
	Marcario Garcia	Mexico	Staff Sergeant	Army	Grosshau, Germany	November 27, 1944	
	Eric G. Gibson*	Sweden	Technician Fifth Grade	Army	Isola Bella, Italy	January 28, 1944	
	Robert M. Hanson*	India	First Lieutenant	Marine Corps	Bougainville Island and New Britain	November 1, 1943 and January 24, 1944	Born to American parents
	Silvestre S. Herrera	Mexico	Private First Class	Army	Mertzwiller, France	March 15, 1945	
	James H. Howard	China	Major	Army Air Forces	Germany	January 11, 1944	Born to American parents
	Isadore S. Jachman*	Germany	Staff Sergeant	Army	Flamierge, Belgium	January 4, 1945	
	Charles A. MacGillivary	Canada	Sergeant	Army	Woelfling, France	January 1, 1945	
	Archibald Mathies*	Scotland, United Kingdom	Sergeant	Army Air Forces	Germany	February 20, 1944	
	Nicholas Minue*	Poland	Private	Army	Medjezel Bab, Tunisia	April 28, 1943	
	Douglas A. Munro*	Canada	Signalman First Class	Coast Guard	Guadalcanal	September 27, 1942	Born to an American father; only Coast Guard MOH recipient
	Peter Tomich*	Bosnia and Herzegovina	Chief Petty Officer Watertender	Navy	Pearl Harbor, Hawaii	December 7, 1941	Born as Petar Herceg

== Korean War ==
This with the * indicates that the Medal of Honor was awarded posthumously

Image	Name	Country of birth	Rank	Branch	Place of action	Date of action	Notes/Reference
	John K. Koelsch*	England, United Kingdom	Lieutenant Junior Grade	Navy	North Korea	July 3, 1951	Born to American parents
	Tibor Rubin	Hungary	Corporal	Army	South Korea; North Korea	July 23, 1950 – April 20, 1953	

== Vietnam War ==
This with the * indicates that the Medal of Honor was awarded posthumously

Image	Name	Country of birth	Rank	Branch	Place of action	Date of action	Notes/Reference
	Lewis Albanese*	Italy	Private First Class	Army	Republic of Vietnam	December 1, 1966	
Head and shoulders of a man with gray hair, a full gray beard, and tinted glasses in a tuxedo. A medal, hanging from a blue ribbon around his neck, sits just below his bow tie.	Jon R. Cavaiani	Ireland	Staff Sergeant	Army	Hill 950, Republic of Vietnam	December 4, 1971 – December 5, 1971	
	Jesus S. Duran*	Mexico	Specialist Fourth Class	Army	Republic of Vietnam	April 10, 1969	
A black and white headshot of Jiminez wearing his military dress blue uniform with hat. He is looking slightly to the right.	Jose F. Jimenez*	Mexico	Lance Corporal	Marine Corps	Quảng Nam Province, Republic of Vietnam	August 28, 1969	
	Peter C. Lemon	Canada	Specialist Fourth Class	Army	Tây Ninh Province, Republic of Vietnam	April 1, 1970	
Head and shoulders of a white man wearing a T-shirt and a military jacket, unbuttoned at the collar, with the word "Rabel" on his right breast and "U.S. Army" on his left. He has on a beret and is holding a rifle over his shoulder by its barrel.	Laszlo Rabel*	Hungary	Staff Sergeant	Army	Bình Định Province, Republic of Vietnam	May 20, 1967	
A color image showing Rascon from the waist up in his military dress uniform with ribbons. His Medal of Honor is visible around his neck and an American flag is visible in the background.	Alfred V. Rascon	Mexico	Specialist Fourth Class	Army	Long Khánh Province, Republic of Vietnam	March 16, 1966	
A color showing Sabo from the waist up in his military uniform with hat.	Leslie H. Sabo, Jr.*	Austria	Sergeant	Army	Se San, Cambodia	May 10, 1970	His parents were Hungarian refugees

== Afghanistan War ==
Image	Name	Country of birth	Rank.	Branch	Place of action	Date of action	Notes/Reference
Young man in military uniform.	Florent Groberg	France	Captain	Army	Afghanistan	August 8, 2012	

== Peacetime ==
Image	Name	Country of birth	Rank	Branch	Place of action	Date of action	Notes/Reference
	William Ahern	Ireland	Watertender	Navy	On board USS Puritan	July 1, 1897	
	William Anderson	Sweden	Coxswain	Navy	On board USS Powhatan	June 28, 1878	
	Richard Bates	Wales, United Kingdom	Seaman	Navy	Eastport, Maine	May 10, 1866	
	Heinrich Behnke	Germany	Seaman	Navy	On board USS Iowa	January 25, 1905	
	William H. Belpitt	Australia	Captain of the Afterguard	Navy	Fuzhou, China	October 7, 1884	
	James Benson	Denmark	Seaman	Navy	On board USS Ossipee	June 20, 1872	Joined the Navy from Japan
	Ernest H. Bjorkman	Sweden	Ordinary Seaman	Navy	Block Island, Rhode Island	January 21, 1903	
	John Brown	Denmark	Captain of the Afterguard	Navy	Eastport, Maine	May 10, 1866	
	Thomas Burke	Ireland	Seaman	Navy	Eastport, Maine	May 10, 1866	
	Thomas Cahey	Ireland	Seaman	Navy	Manila Bay, Philippines	March 31, 1901	
	August Chandron	France	Seaman Apprentice	Navy	Alexandria, Egypt	November 21, 1885	
	Demetri Corahorgi	Italy	Fireman First Class	Navy	On board USS Iowa	January 25, 1905	
	Thomas Cramen	Ireland	Boatswain's Mate	Navy	On board USS Portsmouth	February 7, 1882	
	John Davis	Jamaica	Ordinary Seaman	Navy	Toulon, France	February 1881	
	John Dempsey	Ireland	Seaman	Navy	Shanghai, China	January 23, 1875	
	Austin Denham	England, United Kingdom	Seaman	Navy	Greytown, Nicaragua	April 12, 1872	
	Thomas Eadie	Scotland, United Kingdom	Chief Gunner's Mate	Navy	Cape Cod, Massachusetts	December 18, 1927	
	Walter Elmore	England, United Kingdom	Landman	Navy	Mediterranean	October 1, 1878	Joined the Navy from France
	John Everetts	Canada	Gunner's Mate Third Class	Navy	On board USS Cushing	February 11, 1898	
	Isaac L. Fasseur	Netherlands	Ordinary Seaman	Navy	Callao, Peru	June 13, 1884	Joined the Navy from Chile
	John Flannagan	Ireland	Boatswain's Mate	Navy	Le Havre, France	October 26, 1878	
	Edward Floyd	Ireland	Boilermaker	Navy	On board USS Iowa	January 25, 1905	
	Alphonse Girandy	Guadeloupe	Seaman	Navy	Manila Bay, Philippines	March 31, 1901	
	Rade Grbitch	Austria-Hungary, now Serbia	Seaman	Navy	San Diego, California	July 21, 1905	
	William Halford	England, United Kingdom	Coxswain	Navy	Pacific Ocean	November 18, 1870 – December 19, 1870	
	Luovi Halling	Sweden	Boatswain's Mate First Class	Navy	Martha's Vineyard, Massachusetts	September 15, 1904	
	George Hill	England, United Kingdom	Chief Quarter Gunner	Navy	Greytown, Nicaragua	April 12, 1872	
	Johannes J. Johannessen	Norway	Chief Watertender	Navy	On board USS Iowa	January 25, 1905	Joined the Navy from Japan
	William Johnson	Saint Vincent	Cooper	Navy	Mare Island, California	November 14, 1879	
	Thomas Kersey	Canada	Ordinary Seaman	Navy	On board USS Plymouth	July 26, 1876	
	Hugh King	Ireland	Ordinary Seaman	Navy	Delaware River	September 7, 1871	
	John King	Ireland	Watertender	Navy	On board USS Vicksburg; On board USS Salem	May 29, 1901; September 13, 1909	Double MOH recipient
	Robert Klein	Germany	Chief Carpenter's Mate	Navy	On board USS Raleigh	January 25, 1904	Joined the Navy from France
	Patrick J. Kyle	Ireland	Landman	Navy	Port Mahon, Menorca	March 13, 1879	
	Emile Lejeune	France	Seaman	Navy	On board USS Plymouth	June 6, 1876	
	George Low	Canada	Seaman	Navy	New Orleans, Louisiana	February 15, 1881	Born as George Low Evatt
	Edward Maddin	Canada	Ordinary Seaman	Navy	Lisbon, Portugal	January 9, 1876	
	Joseph Matthews	Malta	Captain of the Top	Navy	On board USS Constitution	February 13, 1879	
	James H. McDonald	Scotland, United Kingdom	Chief Metalsmith	Navy	Isles of Shoals, New Hampshire	May 23, 1939	
	Mons Monssen	Norway	Chief Gunner's Mate	Navy	On board USS Missouri	April 13, 1904	
	Philip Moore	Canada	Seaman	Navy	Genoa, Italy	September 21, 1880	
	William Morse	Germany	Seaman	Navy	Rio de Janeiro, Brazil	September 19, 1880	
	Joseph B. Noil	Canada	Seaman	Navy	On board USS Powhatan	December 26, 1872	
	Isadore Nordstrom	Sweden	Chief Boatswain's Mate	Navy	On board USS Kearsarge	April 13, 1906	
	August Ohmsen	Germany	Master-at-Arms	Navy	On board USS Tallapoosa	August 21, 1884	
	Ludwig A. Olsen	Norway	Captain of the Hold	Navy	Honolulu, Hawaii; Callao, Peru	March 16, 1883; June 13, 1884	Double MOH recipient
	John O'Neal	Ireland	Boatswain's Mate	Navy	Greytown, Nicaragua	April 12, 1872	
	Christian Osepins	Netherlands	Master-at-Arms	Navy	Hampton Roads, Virginia	May 7, 1882	
	Alexander Peters	Russia	Boatswain's Mate First Class	Navy	Martha's Vineyard, Massachusetts	September 15, 1904	
	Richard Pile	Barbados	Ordinary Seaman	Navy	Greytown, Nicaragua	April 12, 1872	
	Patrick Regan	Ireland	Ordinary Seaman	Navy	Coquimbo, Chile	July 30, 1873	
	Patrick Reid	Ireland	Chief Watertender	Navy	On board USS North Dakota	September 8, 1910	
	John Robinson	Cuba	Captain of the Hold	Navy	Pensacola Bay, Florida	January 19, 1867	
	Thomas Robinson	Norway	Captain of the Afterguard	Navy	New Orleans, Louisiana	July 15, 1866	
	Henry L. Simpson	England, United Kingdom	Fireman First Class	Navy	Monrovia, Liberia	October 31, 1877	
	James Smith	Kingdom of Hawaii	Seaman	Navy	Greytown, Nicaragua	April 12, 1872	
	John Smith	Bermuda	Seaman	Navy	Rio de Janeiro, Brazil	September 19, 1880	
	Thomas Smith	Ireland	Seaman	Navy	Pará, Brazil	October 1, 1878	
	Wilhelm Smith	Germany	Gunner's Mate First Class	Navy	On board USS New York	January 24, 1916	
	Thomas Stanton	Ireland	Chief Machinist's Mate	Navy	On board USS North Dakota	September 8, 1910	
	Robert A. Sweeney	Montserrat	Ordinary Seaman	Navy	Hampton Roads, Virginia; On board USS Jamestown	October 26, 1881; December 20, 1883	Double MOH recipient
	August P. Teytand	West Indies	Quartermaster Third Class	Navy	Block Island, Rhode Island	January 21, 1903	
	James Thayer	Ireland	Ship's Corporal	Navy	On board USS Constitution	November 16, 1879	
	Michael Thornton	Ireland	Seaman	Navy	On board USS Leyden	August 26, 1881	
	Paul Tobin	France	Landman	Navy	Hamburg, Germany	July 3, 1871	
	Telesforo Trinidad	Philippines	Fireman Second Class	Navy	On board USS San Diego	January 21, 1915	
	Alexander H. Turvelin	Russia	Seaman	Navy	Toulon, France	February 1881	
	Adam Weissel	Germany	Cook	Navy	On board USS Minnesota	August 26, 1881	
	Karl Westa	Norway	Chief Machinist's Mate	Navy	On board USS North Dakota	September 8, 1910	
	Antonio Williams	Malta	Seaman	Navy	On board USS Huron	November 24, 1877	
	Henry Williams	Canada	Carpenter's Mate	Navy	On board USS Constitution	February 13, 1879	
	August Wilson	Germany	Boilermaker	Navy	On board USS Puritan	July 1, 1897	

== Unknown Soldiers ==
In addition to the named recipients, the United States Congress has on a few occasions passed special legislation to award the Medal of Honor to Unknown Soldiers of allied foreign nations.

Image	Name	Date of Award	Tomb Location	Notes/Reference
	Unknown Soldier of Belgium		Congress Column	
	Unknown Soldier of France	March 4, 1921	Arc de Triomphe	Act of Congress approved 4 March 1921
	Unknown Soldier of Great Britain	March 4, 1921	Westminster Abbey	Act of Congress approved 4 March 1921
	Unknown Soldier of Italy	October 12, 1921	Victor Emmanuel II Monument	Act of Congress approved 12 October 1921
	Unknown Soldier of Romania	June 6, 1923	Carol Park	
