= Thomas Cullen =

Thomas Cullen may refer to:

== People ==
- Thomas H. Cullen (1868–1944), US Representative from New York
- Thomas P. Cullen (c. 1907–1968), New York assemblyman
- Thomas Stephen Cullen (1868–1953), Canadian gynecologist associated with Johns Hopkins Hospital
- Thomas R. Cullen (1904–1984), Canadian politician from Prince Edward Island
- Thomas T. Cullen (born 1977), American federal judge from Virginia
- Thomas Cullen (Medal of Honor) (1839–1913), Irish soldier who fought in the American Civil War
- Gordon Cullen (Thomas Gordon Cullen, 1914–1994), British architect and urban designer
- Tom Cullen (born 1985), British actor
- Tomás Cullen, interim governor of Santa Fe, Argentina, in the 19th century
- Tom Cullen (cricketer) (born 1992), English cricketer
- Tom Cullen (Irish republican) (died 1926)
- Tom Cullen (rugby union), Irish international rugby union player

== Characters ==
- Tom Cullen, a character from The Stand
- Tom Cullen, a character from All Mine to Give

== See also ==
- Cullen (disambiguation)
