= Libaire =

Libaire is a surname. Notable people with the surname include:

- Jardine Libaire, American writer
- Adolphe Libaire (1840–1920), Captain in the Union Army
