= Tom Cosgrove =

Tom Cosgrove may refer to:

- Thomas Cosgrove (1829–1912), Irish soldier
- Tom Cosgrove (American football) (1930–2017), American football center
- Tom Cosgrove (baseball), (born 1996), American baseball pitcher
