= William Oakley (Medal of Honor) =

Historical US soldier

- Born: August 31, 1857; Aberdeen, Scotland
- Died: November 22, 1918 (aged 61); Wivenhoe, Essex, England
- Burial place: Wivenhoe, Essex, England
- Military career
- Allegiance: United States of America
- Branch: United States Navy
- Rank: Gunner's Mate First Class
- Unit: U.S.S. Marblehead
- Conflicts: Spanish–American War
- Awards: Medal of Honor
- Other work: Medal of Honor

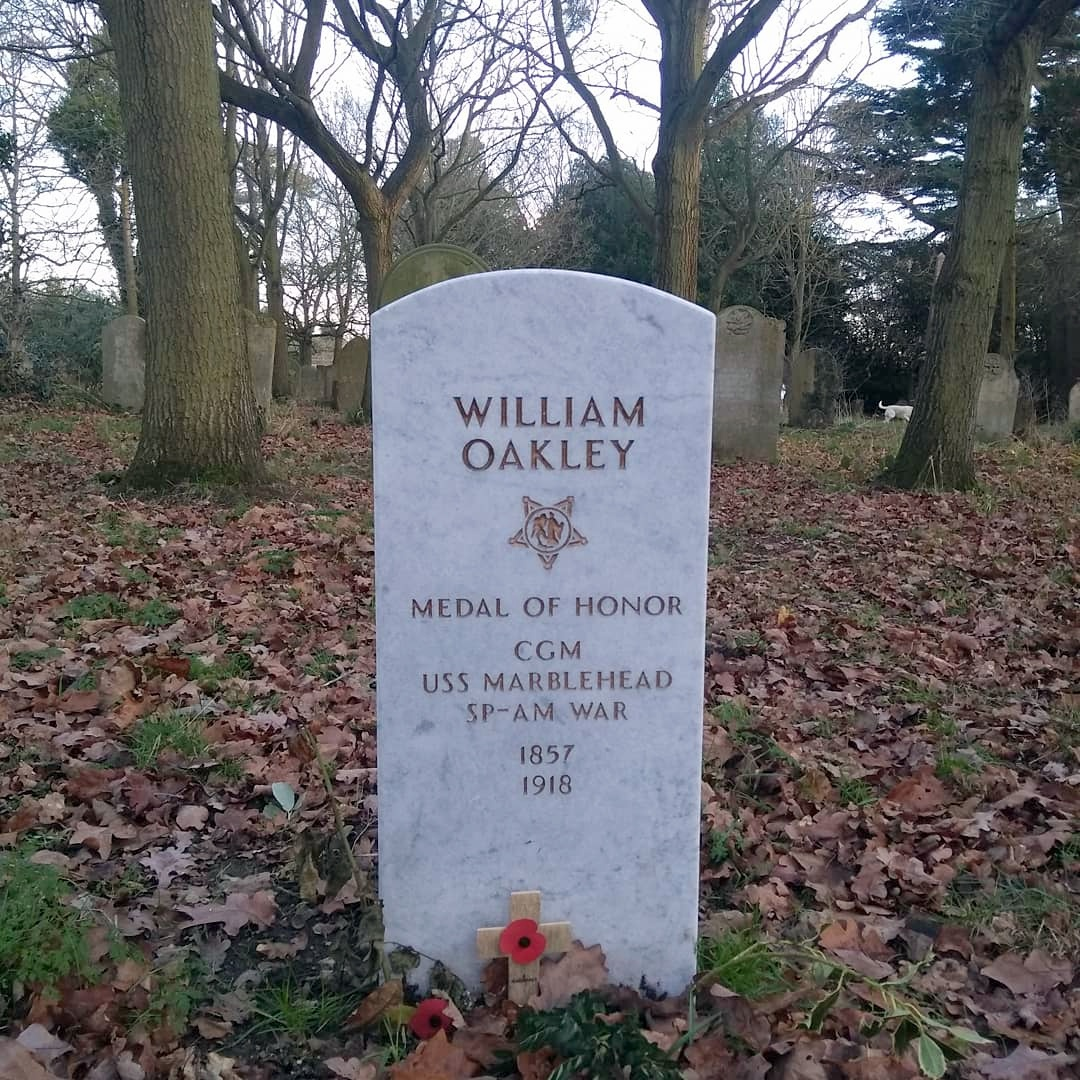
William Oakley's headstone erected in 2018

William Oakley (31 August 1857 – 22 November 1918) was a gunner's mate second class serving in the United States Navy during the Spanish–American War who received the Medal of Honor for bravery.

== Biography ==
Oakley was born on 31 August 1857 at 5 Hanover Street, Aberdeen, Scotland, and emigrated to the United States in April 1880. He enlisted in the Navy at Boston in November 1880 and was sent to fight in the Spanish–American War aboard the U.S.S. Marblehead as a gunner's mate second class. He was later promoted to gunner's mate first class.

He returned to England after 1911 as a US Navy pensioner and died 22 November 1918 in Wivenhoe, Essex, England. He was buried in the Old Cemetery (grave reference: section B-2-65).

In 2018 the US government erected a headstone at his grave which had previously been unmarked.

== Medal of Honor citation ==
The President of the United States of America, in the name of Congress, takes pleasure in presenting the Medal of Honor to Gunner's Mate Second Class William Oakley, United States Navy, for extraordinary heroism in action on board the U.S.S. Marblehead during the operation of cutting the cable leading from Cienfuegos, Cuba, 11 May 1898. Facing the heavy fire of the enemy, Gunner's Mate Second Class Oakley displayed extraordinary bravery and coolness throughout this period.

== See also ==
- List of Medal of Honor recipients for the Spanish–American War
- List of foreign-born Medal of Honor recipients
