= William Meyer (Medal of Honor) =

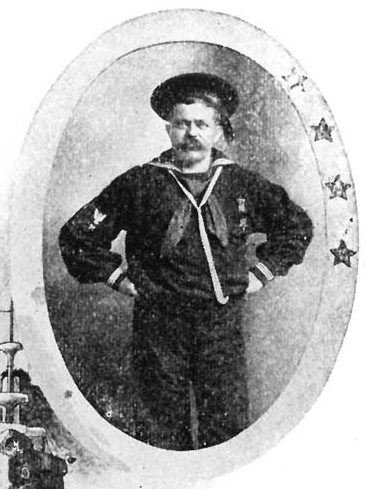
- Carpenter's Mate Third Class William Meyer
- Born: June 22, 1863; Germany
- Died: September 6, 1926 (aged 63); Chicago, Illinois, US
- Burial place: Forest Home Cemetery, Chicago
- Military career
- Allegiance: United States
- Branch: United States Navy
- Rank: Carpenter's Mate Third Class
- Unit: USS Nashville (PG-7)
- Conflicts: Spanish–American War; *Battle of Cienfuegos
- Awards: Medal of Honor

William Meyer (June 22, 1863 – September 6, 1926) was a United States Navy sailor and a recipient of America's highest military decoration—the Medal of Honor—for his actions in the Battle of Cienfuegos during the Spanish–American War.

William Meyer died at the age of 63 and was buried in Forest Home Cemetery, Chicago.

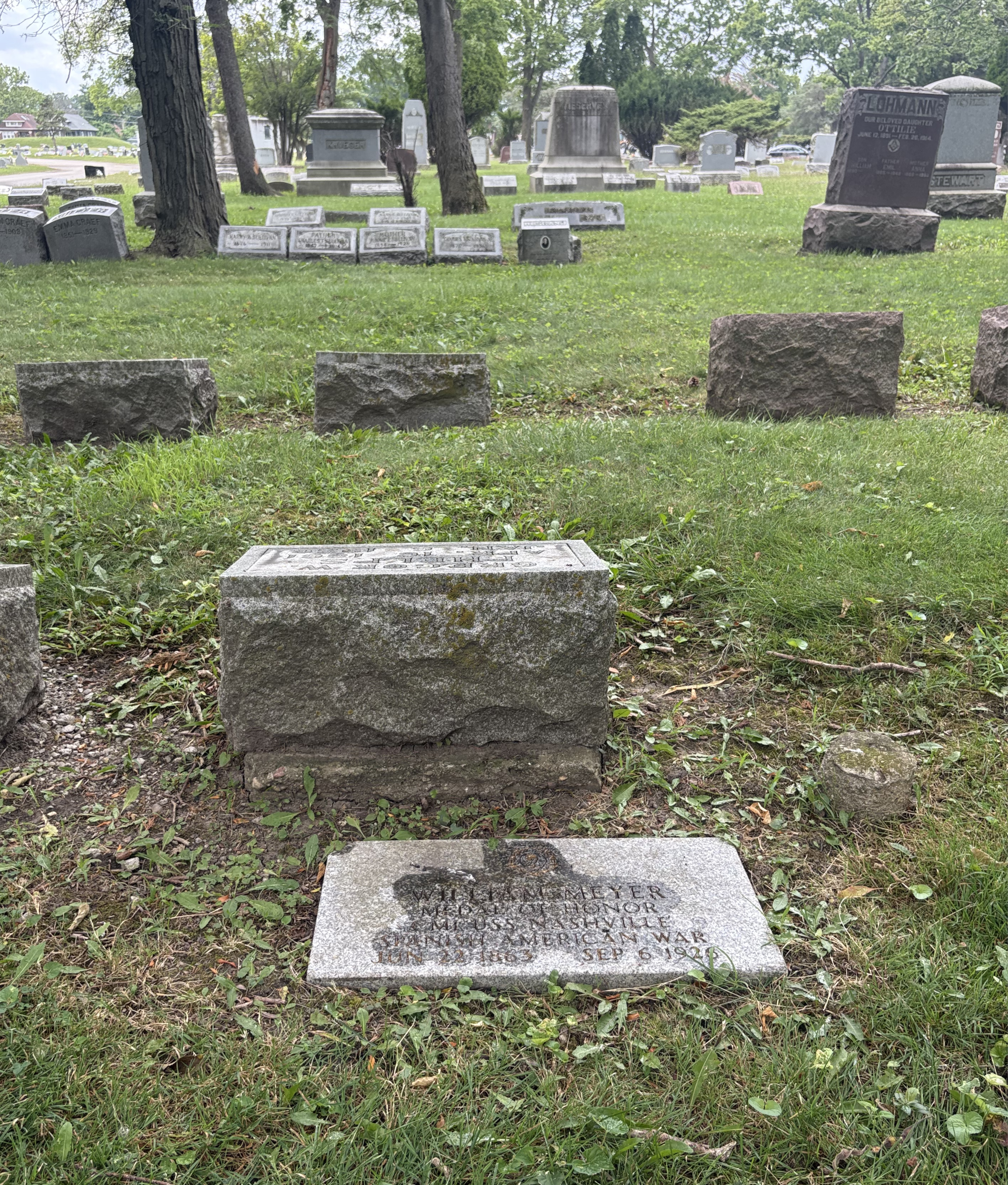
Meyer's grave at Forest Home Cemetery

== Medal of Honor citation ==
Carpenter's Mate Third Class Meyer's official Medal of Honor citation reads:

On board the U.S.S. Nashville during the operation of cutting the cable leading from Cienfuegos, Cuba, 11 May 1898. Facing the heavy fire of the enemy, Meyer displayed extraordinary bravery and coolness throughout this action.

== See also ==
- List of Medal of Honor recipients for the Spanish–American War
