= Franz Anton Itrich =

- Born: November 26, 1853; Gross Katz/Wielki Kack Germany
- Died: June 11, 1933 (aged 79)
- Military career
- Allegiance: United States
- Branch: United States Navy
- Rank: Chief Carpenter's Mate
- Unit: USS Petrel
- Conflicts: Spanish–American War
- Awards: Medal of Honor

Franz Anton Itrich (November 26, 1853 – June 11, 1933) was a chief carpenter's mate serving in the United States Navy during the Spanish–American War who received the Medal of Honor for bravery.

== Biography ==
Itrich was born November 26, 1853, in Gross Katz, Germany in Polish family and enlisted the United States Navy in June 1884. He served as a chief carpenter's mate during the Spanish–American War aboard the gunboat USS Petrel. He was awarded the Medal of Honor for heroism on board USS Petrel during the Battle of Manila Bay on May 1, 1898.

Itrich was promoted to the warrant officer rank of carpenter on September 29, 1898. He was promoted to chief carpenter on September 29, 1904. He retired from the Navy on August 14, 1909, after 25 years of service.

He died June 11, 1933.

== Medal of Honor citation ==
Rank and organization: Chief Carpenter's Mate, U.S. Navy. Born: 26 November 1853, Gross Katz, Germany. Accredited to: California. G.O. No.: 13, 5 December 1900.

Citation:

On board the U.S.S. Petrel, Manila, Philippine Islands, 1 May 1898. Serving in the presence of the enemy, Itrich displayed heroism during the action.

== See also ==
- List of Medal of Honor recipients for the Spanish–American War
