= Robert Klein (Medal of Honor) =

- Born: November 11, 1848; Gerdonen, Germany
- Died: November 29, 1931 (aged 83); Shanghai, China
- Military career
- Allegiance: United States
- Branch: United States Navy
- Rank: Chief Carpenter's Mate
- Unit: USS Raleigh (C-8)
- Conflicts: Spanish–American War
- Awards: Medal of Honor

Robert Klein (November 11, 1848 – November 29, 1931) was a United States Navy sailor and a recipient of the United States military's highest decoration, the Medal of Honor.

== Biography ==
Klein was born November 11, 1848, in Gerdonen, Germany, and joined the U.S. Navy from Marseille, France. He served in the Spanish–American War of 1898. By January 25, 1904, he was a chief carpenter's mate on the USS Raleigh (C-8). On that day, he rescued several shipmates who had been overcome by turpentine fumes in a double bottom compartment. For this action, he was awarded the Medal of Honor nine months later, on October 6, 1904.

Klein's official Medal of Honor citation reads:

Serving on board the U.S.S. Raleigh, for heroism in rescuing shipmates overcome in double bottoms by fumes of turpentine, 25 January 1904.

After his military service, Klein lived for several decades in Shanghai, China; he died there at age 83 on November 29, 1931.

== See also ==
- List of Medal of Honor recipients
