= Jacob Trautman =

- Born: 1840; Germany
- Died: November 7, 1898 (aged 58); Pittsburgh, Pennsylvania, United States
- Burial place: South Side Cemetery
- Military career
- Allegiance: United States
- Branch: United States Army
- Service years: 1861–1865; 1871?–1891
- Rank: First sergeant
- Units: 5th Pennsylvania Cavalry; 7th U.S. Cavalry
- Conflicts: Civil War; Indian Wars Battle of Wounded Knee
- Awards: Medal of Honor

First Sergeant Jacob Trautman (1840 – November 7, 1898) was a German-born soldier in the U.S. Army. His service included an enlistment with a Pennsylvania cavalry regiment during the Civil War and with the 7th Cavalry Regiment during the Indian Wars. He was one of twenty men who received the Medal of Honor for his actions at the Battle of Wounded Knee, now called the Wounded Knee Massacre, and afterward.

== Biography ==
Jacob Trautman was born in Germany, in 1840 to Jacob and Margaret Trautman. He emigrated to the United States.

Trautman made a claim for a pension to the pensions office of the War Department based on service with Company E and Company L, Pennsylvania Cavalry and with Troop I, 7th Cavalry Regiment Trautman enlisted in the 5th Pennsylvania Cavalry as a private and was discharged as a sergeant. Trautman mustered into Company L, 5th Cavalry, Pennsylvania Volunteers on August 9, 1861; he was promoted to corporal and later to sergeant; and was transferred to Company E on June 5, 1865. In Company E, Trautman served as a sergeant and mustered out with the company on August 7, 1865; his individual record is annotated "Vet."

Trautman enlisted with I Troop, 7th Cavalry Regiment on January 4, 1876, in Pittsburgh, Pennsylvania. This enlistment was his second but there is no identification of the nature of his first term (Civil War or some service between 1865 and 1876). He was discharged on January 3, 1881, at Fort Totten, Dakota Territory as a first sergeant. Trautman re-enlisted immediately on January 4, 1881, at Fort Totten and served until January 3, 1886, when he was discharged at Fort Meade, Dakota Territory as a first sergeant.

Trautman next re-enlisted at Fort Totten on January 4, 1886.

=== Wounded Knee Massacre ===
He was part of a force sent to arrest the Sioux chieftain Big Foot and disarm his 350 followers; he was among the cavalry troopers who, on the morning of December 29, 1890, surrounded his camp on the banks of Wounded Knee Creek. Trautman distinguished himself by killing an armed Sioux warrior "at close quarters", and was among the nineteen cavalrymen who received the Medal of Honor. His term of service expired on January 3, 1891, at the Pine Ridge Agency, South Dakota. Although he was entitled to retire with pension, Troutman re-enlisted for the last time on January 4, 1891, while at the Pine Ridge Agency; he retired on August 3, 1891.

== Later life and death ==
Trautman returned to Pittsburgh where he died at his home at 21 Carson Street on November 7, 1898, from a cerebral hemorrhage at the age of 58. He was buried at South Side Cemetery.

== Medal of Honor citation ==
Killed a hostile Indian at close quarters, and, although entitled to retirement from service, remained to the close of the campaign.

== Controversy ==
Mass Grave for the Dead Lakota After the Engagement at Wounded Knee

There have been several attempts by various parties to rescind the Medals of Honor awarded in connection with the Wounded Knee Massacre. Proponents claim that the engagement was in-fact a massacre and not a battle, due to the high number of killed and wounded Lakota women and children and the very one-sided casualty counts. Estimates of the Lakota losses indicate 150–300 killed, of which up to 200 were women and children. Additionally, as many as 51 were wounded. In contrast, the 7th Cavalry suffered 25 killed and 39 wounded, many being the result of friendly fire.

Calvin Spotted Elk, direct descendant of Chief Spotted Elk killed at Wounded Knee, launched a petition to rescind medals from the soldiers who participated in the battle.

The Army has also been criticized more generally for the seemingly disproportionate number of Medals of Honor awarded in connection with the battle. For comparison, 19 Medals were awarded at Wounded Knee, 21 at the Battle of Cedar Creek, and 20 at the Battle of Antietam. Respectively, Cedar Creek and Antietam involved 52,712 and 113,000 troops, suffering 8,674 and 22,717 casualties. Wounded Knee, however, involved 610 combatants and resulted in as many as 705 casualties (including non-combatants).

== See also ==
- List of Medal of Honor recipients for the Indian Wars
