= Francis Irsch =

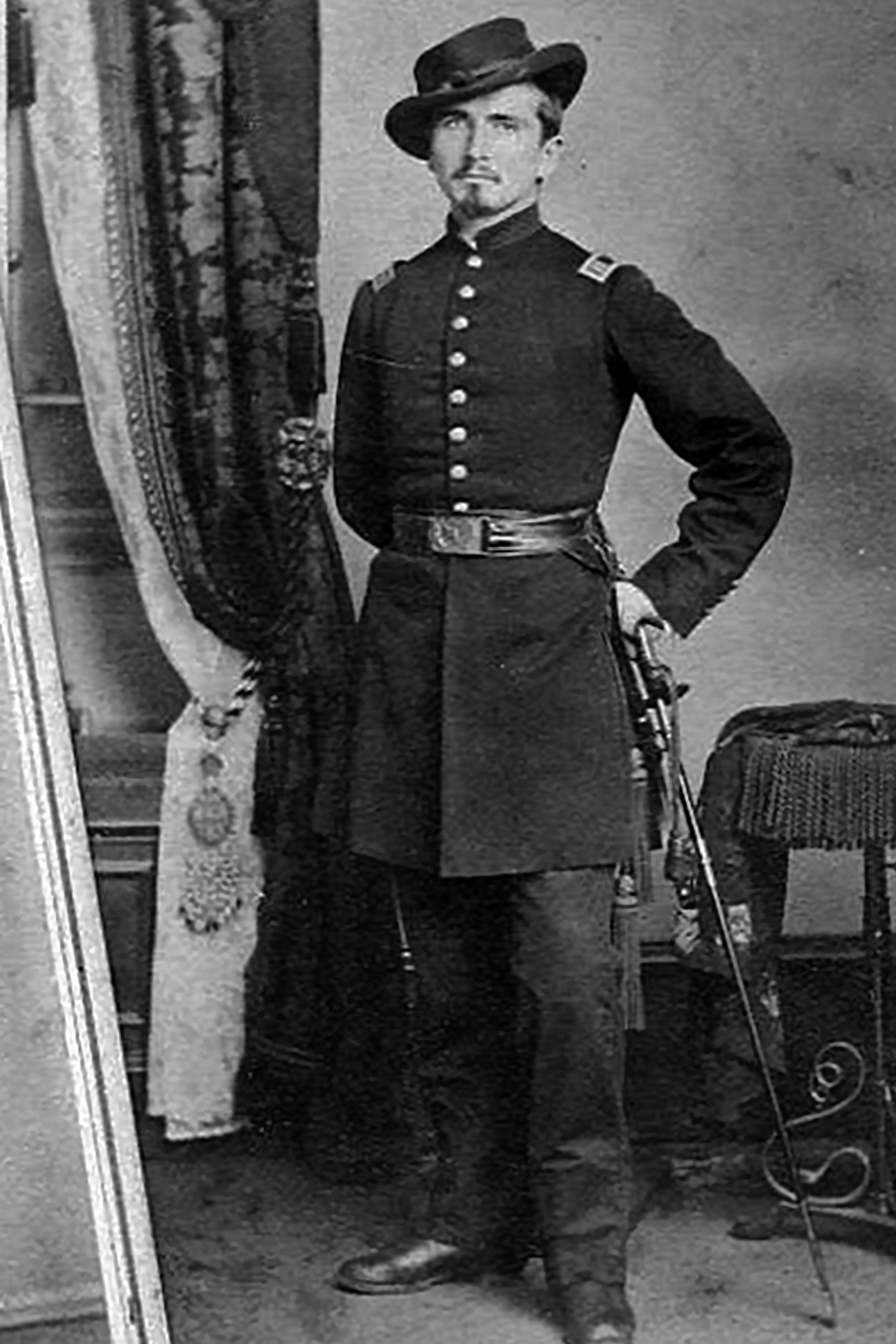
- Born: December 4, 1840; Landkreis Trier-Saarburg, Kingdom of Prussia
- Died: August 19, 1906 (aged 65); Tampa, Florida, USA
- Burial place: Woodlawn Cemetery, Tampa, Florida, USA
- Military career
- Allegiance: United States of America
- Service years: 1861–1865
- Rank: Captain
- Unit: 45th New York Volunteer Infantry Regiment
- Awards: Medal of Honor

Francis Irsch (December 4, 1840 in Landkreis Trier-Saarburg, Kingdom of Prussia – August 19, 1906 in Tampa, Florida, USA) was an American soldier who fought in the American Civil War. He was held prisoner of war by the Confederate States Army until his release on March 1, 1865.

In May 1892, Irsch received the Medal of Honor for his actions at the Battle of Gettysburg on July 1, 1863, including "gallantry in flanking the enemy and capturing a number of prisoners and in holding a part of the town against heavy odds while the Army was rallying on Cemetery Hill".

== See also ==
- List of Medal of Honor recipients for the Gettysburg Campaign
- List of foreign-born Medal of Honor recipients
