= John L. Younker =

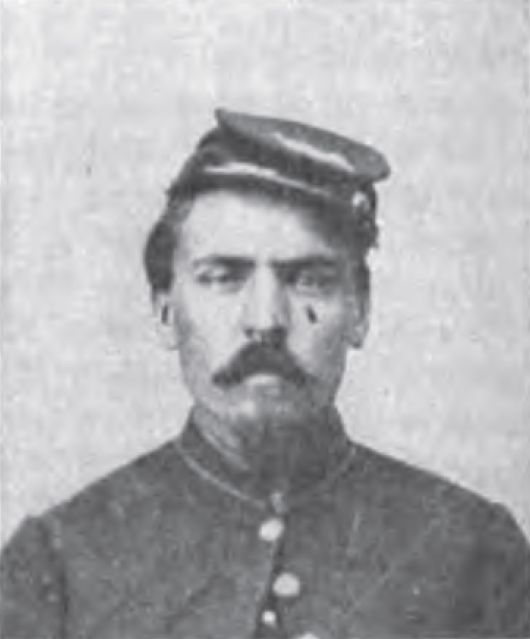
- Born: November 16, 1836; Württemberg
- Died: May 18, 1911 (aged 74); Ohio
- Burial place: Logan, Ohio
- Military career
- Allegiance: United States of America
- Branch: United States Army
- Service years: 1862–1865
- Rank: Private
- Units: (United States) Company A, 12th U.S. Infantry
- Conflicts: Battle of Cedar Mountain; American Civil War
- Awards: Medal of Honor

John L. Younker (November 16, 1836 – May 18, 1911) was an American soldier who fought in the American Civil War. Younker received his country's highest award for bravery during combat, the Medal of Honor. Younker's medal was won for his heroism at the Battle of Cedar Mountain in Virginia on August 9, 1862. He was honored with the award on November 1, 1893.

Younker was born in Württemberg, Germany. He joined the Army from Lancaster, Ohio in March 1862, and was discharged in March 1865. He is buried in Logan, Ohio.

== Medal of Honor citation ==
The President of the United States of America, in the name of Congress, takes pleasure in presenting the Medal of Honor to Private John L. Younker, United States Army, for extraordinary heroism on 9 August 1862, while serving with Company A, 12th U.S. Infantry, in action at Cedar Mountain, Virginia. Private Younker voluntarily carried an order, at great risk of life in the face of a fire of grape and canister; in doing this he was wounded.

== See also ==
- List of American Civil War Medal of Honor recipients: T–Z
