= William Garvin (Medal of Honor) =

American Civil War Medal of Honor recipient (born 1985)

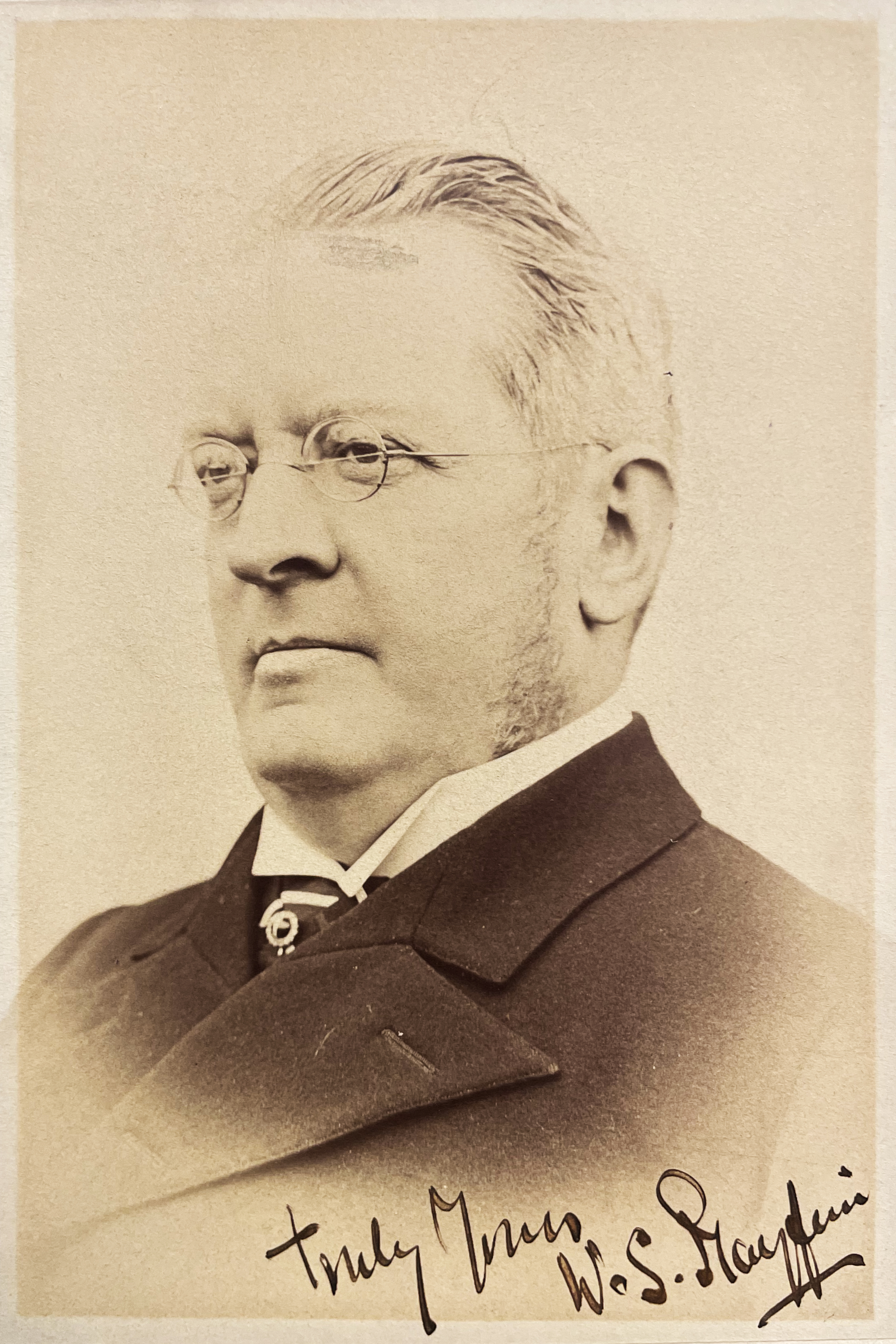
- Born: 1835; Canada
- Military career
- Allegiance: United States
- Branch: United States Army
- Rank: Captain of the Forecastle
- Unit: United States Navy USS Agawam
- Conflicts: First Battle of Fort Fisher; American Civil War
- Awards: Medal of Honor

William Garvin (born 1835) was an American sailor who fought in the American Civil War. Garvin received his country's highest award for bravery during combat, the Medal of Honor. Garvin's medal was won for his actions during the First Battle of Fort Fisher on board the U.S.S. Agawam. He was posthumously honored with the award on December 31, 1864.

Garvin was from British North America and entered the American military in Plymouth, Connecticut. Garvin was one of 30 Canadians to win the Medal of Honor.

== Medal of Honor citation ==
The President of the United States of America, in the name of Congress, takes pleasure in presenting the Medal of Honor to Captain of the Forecastle William Garvin, United States Navy, for extraordinary heroism in action while serving onboard the U.S.S. Agawam, as one of a volunteer crew of a powder boat which was exploded near Fort Fisher, North Carolina, 23 December 1864. The powder boat, towed in by the Wilderness to prevent detection by the enemy, cast off and slowly steamed to within 300 yards of the beach. After fuses and fires had been lit and a second anchor with short scope let go to assure the boat's tailing inshore, the crew again boarded the Wilderness and proceeded a distance of 12 miles from shore. Less than two hours later the explosion took place, and the following day fires were observed still burning at the fort.

== See also ==
- List of American Civil War Medal of Honor recipients: G–L
