= Chancellorsville, Virginia =

- Unincorporated community
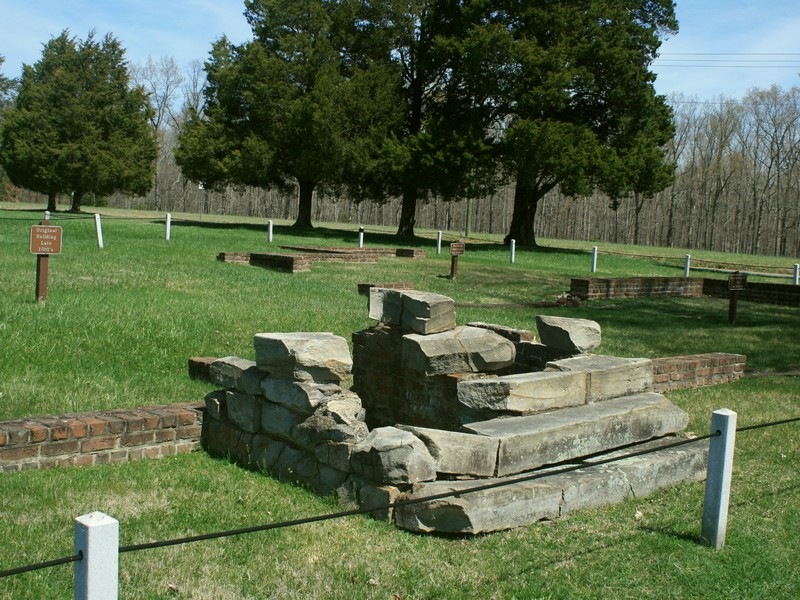
- Ruins of George Chancellor's house at Chancellorsville battlefield

- Location within the Commonwealth of Virginia Chancellorsville, Virginia (Virginia) Chancellorsville, Virginia (the United States)
- Coordinates: 38°18′30″N 77°38′4″W
- Country: United States
- State: Virginia
- County: Spotsylvania
- Time zone: UTC−5 (Eastern (EST))
  - Summer (DST): UTC−4 (EDT)
- GNIS feature ID: 1492743

Chancellorsville is a historic site and unincorporated community in Spotsylvania County, Virginia, United States, about ten miles west of Fredericksburg. The name of the locale derives from the mid-19th century inn operated by the family of George Chancellor at the intersection of the Orange Turnpike and Orange Plank Road. The Battle of Chancellorsville occurred there during the American Civil War in May 1863, and the Battle of the Wilderness was fought nearby in May 1864. During the 1863 battle, Lt. Gen. Thomas J. "Stonewall" Jackson was wounded by friendly fire, dying eight days later on May 10, 1863, from pneumonia.

Portions of both the Chancellorsville and Wilderness battlefields are protected within Fredericksburg and Spotsylvania National Military Park, although both battlefields have come under threat from development in recent years. The site of the Chancellorsville Inn, where Union Gen. Joseph Hooker had his headquarters during the 1863 battle, is preserved in the national military park, as is the site of Jackson's wounding. The site of Jackson's death is located at Guinea Station in Caroline County, south of Fredericksburg, and is also preserved as part of the park.

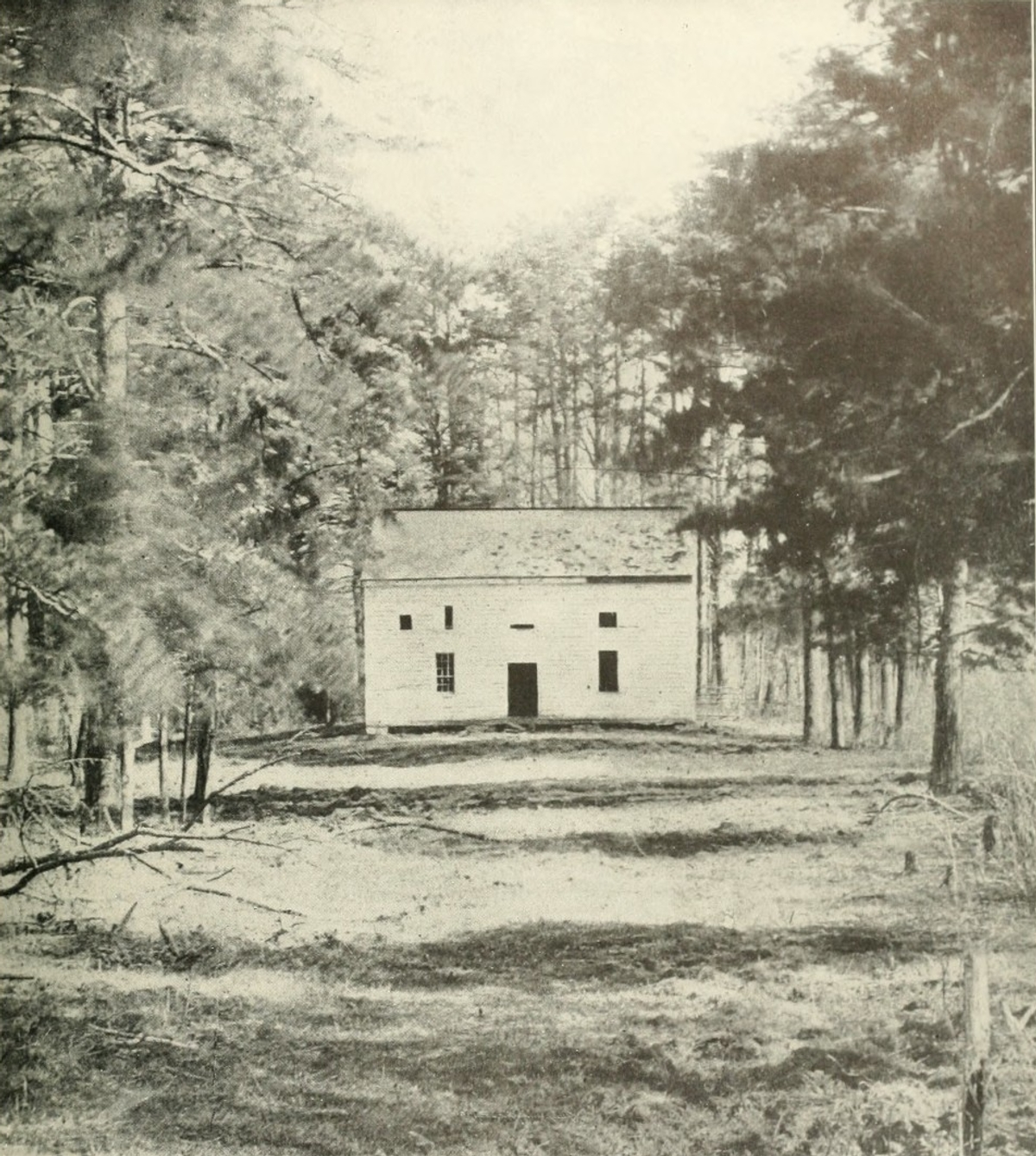
Wilderness Church at Chancellorsville was the center of a stand made by Union general Schurz's division during Stonewall Jackson's surprise flank attack.

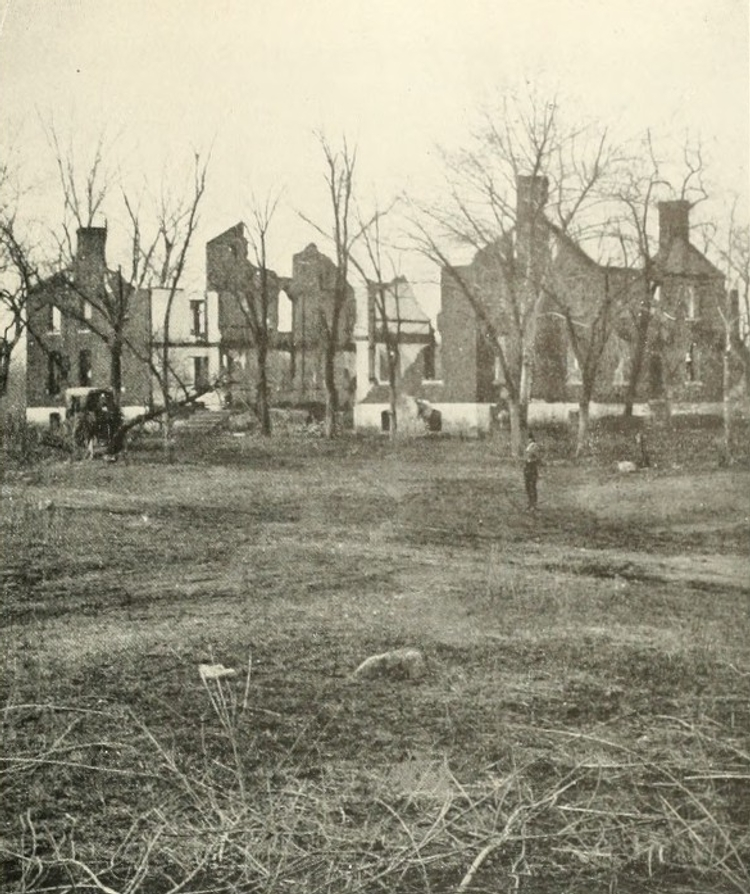
Ruins of the Chancellor House which was the headquarters of Federal General Joseph Hooker of the Army of the Potomac during the battle, later burned, May 1863

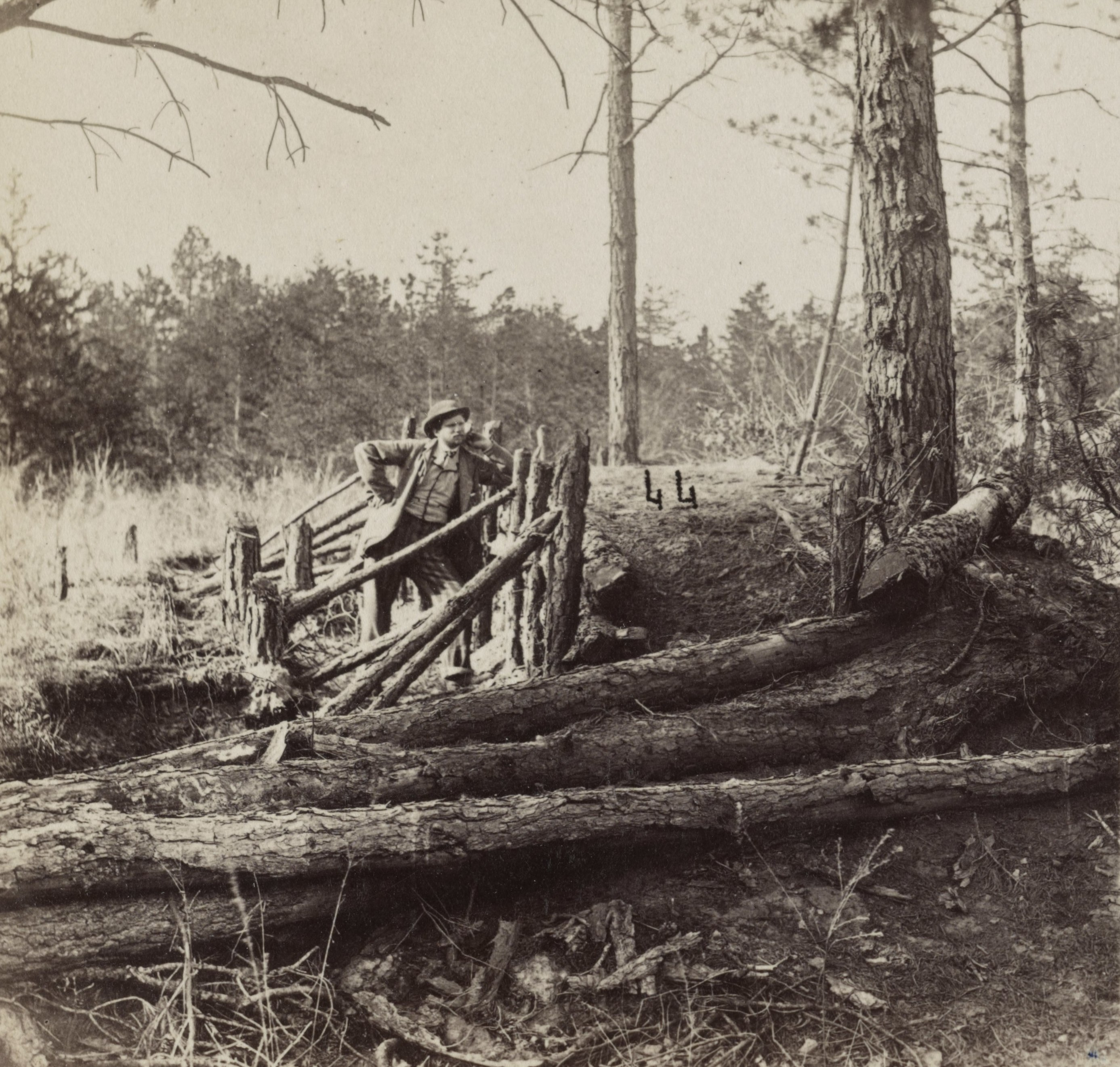
Half stereo detail of Lt George Chancellor Co E 9th Virginia Cavalry on the Wilderness Battlefield, standing at some Confederate breastworks near Palmer's field on the Orange Turnpike – George Oscar Brown, 1866
