= William Martin (American sailor, USS Benton) =

- Born: September 22, 1835; New York City, US
- Died: April 3, 1914 (aged 78); Alto Pass, Illinois, US
- Burial place: Alto Pass Cemetery, Alto Pass, Illinois, US
- Military career
- Allegiance: United States
- Branch: Union Navy
- Rank: Boatswain's mate
- Unit: USS Benton
- Conflicts: American Civil War: Battle of Island Number Ten; Battle of Plum Point Bend; First Battle of Memphis; Siege of Vicksburg; Battle of Grand Gulf; Red River Campaign; Battle of Fort DeRussy
- Awards: Medal of Honor

William Martin (1835–1914) was a Union Navy sailor in the American Civil War and a recipient of the U.S. military's highest decoration, the Medal of Honor, for his actions during the attack on Haines Bluff, Yazoo River, 27 December 1862.

== Biography ==
Born in 1835 in New York, Martin joined the U.S. Navy. He served during the Civil War as a Boatswain's Mate and Master's Mate on the ironclad USS Benton. He served on the Benton throughout its service in the Western Theater during the war. On 27 December 1862, in an attack on Haines Bluff, Yazoo River, Mississippi, Martin was noticed for his bravery throughout the 90-minute fight. For this action, he was awarded the Medal of Honor a year later, on April 3, 1863.

He served through to the end of the war and was discharged in 1865. On January 13, 1887, at 51 years, he married a 49-year-old widowed mother of four, Mary A. Spann Standard in Alto Pass. They remained married until his death, twenty-seven years later in 1914.

Martin's official Medal of Honor citation reads:

The President of the United States of America, in the name of Congress, takes pleasure in presenting the Medal of Honor to Boatswain's Mate William Martin, United States Navy, for extraordinary heroism in action while serving as Boatswain's Mate on board the U.S.S. Benton during the attack on Haines Bluff, Yazoo River, Mississippi, 27 December 1862. Taking part in the hour-and-a-half engagement with the enemy, who had the dead range of the vessel and was punishing her with heavy fire, Boatswain's Mate Martin served courageously throughout the battle until the Benton was ordered to withdraw.

== See also ==
- List of American Civil War Medal of Honor recipients
- USS Benton
- Siege of Vicksburg

== Bibliography ==
- "William Martin". Congressional Medal of Honor Society. Congressional Medal of Honor Society. February 22, 2022.
- "William Martin". The Wall of Valor Project. Wall of Valor: The Military Medals Database. August 8, 2020.
- "William Martin". Medal of Honor Recipients. The Comprehensive Guide to the Victoria & George Cross. December 15, 2015.
