= Rudolph Stauffer =

Swiss-born American soldier in the U.S. Army

- Born: November 27, 1836; Bern, Switzerland
- Died: June 9, 1918 (aged 81); Washington, D.C., United States
- Burial place: United States Soldiers' and Airmen's Home National Cemetery
- Military career
- Allegiance: United States of America
- Branch: United States Army
- Service years: 1855–1878
- Rank: First Sergeant
- Unit: 5th U.S. Cavalry
- Conflicts: Indian Wars; Apache Wars
- Awards: Medal of Honor

First Sergeant Rudolph Stauffer (November 27, 1836 – June 9, 1918) was a Swiss-born American soldier in the U.S. Army who served with the 5th U.S. Cavalry in the Apache Wars. He was one of twelve soldiers, along with ten Apache Scouts, awarded the Medal of Honor during Lieutenant Colonel George Crook's "winter campaign" of 1872–73, being cited for gallantry in battle against renegade Apaches near Camp Hualpai. Charles King, while serving with the 5th U.S. Cavalry in his youth, wrote of him in his memoirs as "grim old Stauffer, the first sergeant".

== Biography ==
Rudolph Stauffer was born in Bern, Switzerland, on November 27, 1836. He later emigrated to the United States and settled in Cincinnati, Ohio.

On June 24, 1855, he enlisted in the United States Army and was eventually assigned to Company K of the 2nd U.S. Cavalry Regiment (which later became 5th U.S. Cavalry Regiment). By the early 1870s, a "typical hard-bitten noncommissioned officer of the old cavalry", he had risen to the rank of first sergeant.

Stauffer was posted at Camp Hualpai in the Arizona Territory during the Apache Wars. On May 19, 1872, he led a small cavalry force, along with Ed Clark and Dan O'Leary, after an Apache raiding party which had stolen cattle from a ranch in Williamson Valley. Stauffer and the cavalry troopers pursued the raiders eastward over a distance of 110 miles when, according to Lieutenant Colonel George Crook, a "terrible fight occurred". Two soldiers were wounded, four renegades were killed, and one head of cattle was recovered. A month later, he was involved in another engagement with the Apaches when, on June 30, he and several other soldiers held off the hostile Indians from a butte near Camp Verde; the location was later named "Stauffer's Butte" in his honor. Stauffer was also presented with the Medal of Honor for his leadership during the battle.

In November of that year, Stauffer was part of Lieutenant Colonel George Crook's so-called "winter campaign" against renegades still active after the surrender of Cochise in late-1872. He was one of 12 cavalrymen, along with 10 Apache scouts, who guided Crook's columns in the mountainous area of the Tonto Basin where Western Apache and Yavapai bands used as a base for raiding parties and had successfully eluded the U.S. Army for a number of years. Stauffer was among the scouts cited for "gallant conduct during the campaigns and engagements with Apaches", many of whom would also be awarded the Medal of Honor, which he received on July 30, 1875.

After leaving the army on December 11, 1878, Stauffer retired to the Soldiers' Home in Washington, D.C. where he lived until his death on June 9, 1918, at the age of 81. A lifelong bachelor, he has no known descendants. He is one of 22 Medal of Honor recipients, along with three other veterans of the Apache Wars, interred at the United States Soldiers' and Airmen's Home National Cemetery.

== Medal of Honor citation ==
Rank and organization: First Sergeant, Company K, 5th U.S. Cavalry. Place and date: Near Camp Hualpai, Ariz., 1872. Entered service at: --. Birth: Switzerland. Date of issue: 30 July 1875.

Citation:

Gallantry on scouts after Indians.

== See also ==
- List of Medal of Honor recipients for the Indian Wars
