= Thomas Bourne =

- Born: c. 1834; England
- Died: March 22, 1888 (aged 53–54)
- Burial place: Poe Cemetery, Cass County, Michigan
- Military career
- Allegiance: United States of America; Union
- Branch: United States Navy; Union Navy
- Service years: 1861–1864
- Rank: Chief Quartermaster
- Unit: USS Varuna
- Conflicts: American Civil War • Battle of Forts Jackson and St. Philip
- Awards: Medal of Honor

Thomas Bourne (c. 1834 – March 22, 1888) was a Union Navy sailor in the American Civil War and a recipient of the United States military's highest decoration, the Medal of Honor, for his actions at the Battle of Forts Jackson and St. Philip.

== Biography ==
A native of England, Bourne began his career as a sailor at age 14, serving as a cabin boy on ships in the Atlantic Ocean. He eventually found his way to the U.S. state of New York, and enlisted in the U.S. Navy from there in 1861. By April 1862, he had reached the rank of seaman and was a gun captain aboard the USS Varuna. On April 24, the Varuna participated in a Union attack on Fort Jackson and Fort St. Philip near New Orleans, Louisiana. During this action, the ship was rammed twice by the Confederate steamer CSS Governor Moore (formerly known as the Charles Morgan) and eventually sunk. Bourne continued to operate his gun throughout the close-range fight, despite intense Confederate fire. He survived the battle and the sinking without injury. For these actions, he was awarded the Medal of Honor a year later, on April 3, 1863.

In 1864, Bourne was injured while shifting a gun. He was discharged later that year, in November, at the rank of chief quartermaster.

After his military service, Bourne became a farmer in the village of Jones in Cass County, Michigan. He married Hannah Fowler and the couple moved to Schoolcraft, Michigan. About six months later, his wife died and Bourne returned to Jones; he eventually remarried. Bourne died of heart disease at about age 53 and was buried at Poe Cemetery near Jones. His grave was marked by a simple veteran's headstone until 2009, when it was discovered that he was a Medal of Honor recipient. A new headstone which made note of his Medal of Honor was dedicated on October 10, 2009.

Bourne's Medal of Honor was passed down through his family until reaching his great-great-granddaughter, who donated the medal to Michigan's Own Military & Space Museum in Frankenmuth.

== Medal of Honor citation ==
Bourne's official Medal of Honor citation reads:

Served as captain of a gun on board the U.S.S. Varuna during an attack on Forts Jackson and St. Philip and while under fire and ramming by the rebel ship Morgan, 24 April 1862. During this action at extremely close range while his ship was under furious fire and was twice rammed by the rebel ship Morgan, Bourne remained steadfast at his gun and was instrumental in inflicting damage on the enemy until the Varuna, badly damaged and forced to beach, was finally sunk.

== See also ==
- List of Medal of Honor recipients
