= William Ellis (Medal of Honor) =

- Born: c. 1834; England
- Died: February 1, 1875 (aged 40–41); San Bernardino County, California, US
- Military career
- Allegiance: United States; Union
- Branch: United States Navy; Union Army
- Service years: 1861–1865
- Rank: First Sergeant; Second Lieutenant
- Units: Company K, 3rd Wisconsin Volunteer Cavalry Regiment
- Conflicts: American Civil War
- Awards: Medal of Honor

William Ellis (c. 1834 – February 1, 1875) served in the Union Army during the American Civil War. He received the Medal of Honor.

Ellis was born in England in about 1834. His official residence when he received his Medal of Honor was listed as Watertown, Wisconsin. His name was misspelled as "William Elise" on his Medal of Honor citation.

He died February 1, 1875, in San Bernardino County, California.

== Medal of Honor citation ==
His award citation reads:

The President of the United States of America, in the name of Congress, takes pleasure in presenting the Medal of Honor to First Sergeant William Ellis, United States Army, for extraordinary heroism on 14 January 1865, while serving with Company K, 3d Wisconsin Cavalry, in action at Dardanelles, Arkansas. First Sergeant William Ellis remained at his post after receiving three wounds, and only retired, by his commanding officer's orders, after being wounded the fourth time.

== See also ==
- List of American Civil War Medal of Honor recipients
