= Joseph Keele =

Irish-American soldier (1840–1906)

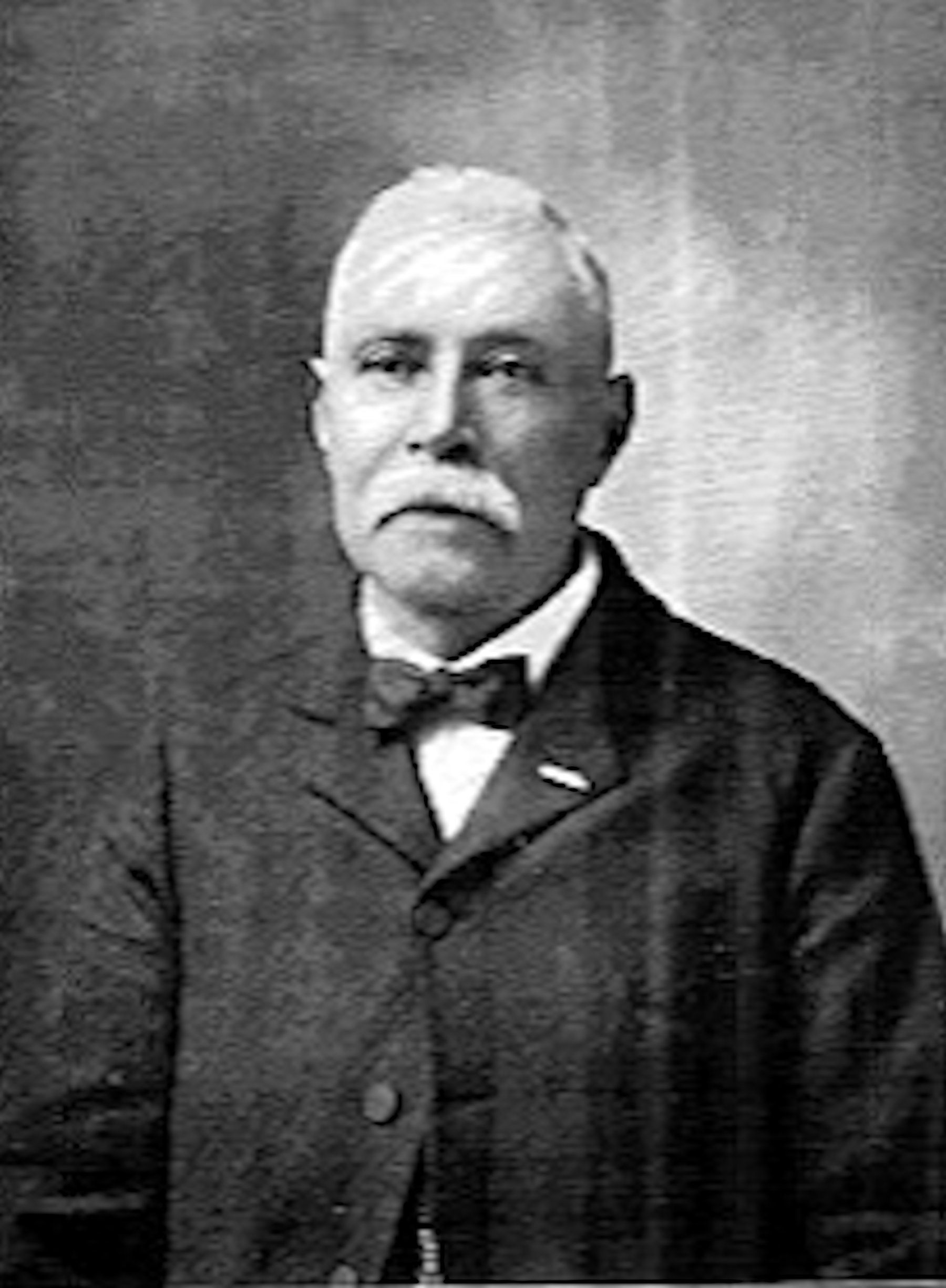
Joseph Keele, c1895

Joseph Keele (August 1, 1840 - October 16, 1906) was an Irish born soldier and recipient of the Medal of Honor for actions during the American Civil War.

== Biography ==
Keele was born in Ireland on August 1, 1840. He moved to America sometime between his birth and the start of the American Civil War. He served as a sergeant major in the 182nd New York Volunteer Infantry. He earned his medal in action at Battle of North Anna, Virginia on May 23, 1864. By the end of the war, Keele had obtained the rank of captain. His medal was issued on October 25, 1867. Keele died in Jersey City, New Jersey on October 16, 1906. He is buried in Bayview Cemetery in Jersey City, New Jersey.

== Medal of Honor citation ==
For extraordinary heroism on 23 May 1864, in action at North Anna River, Virginia. Voluntarily and at the risk of his life carried orders to the brigade commander, which resulted in saving the works his regiment was defending.
