= James Pym =

British soldier in the U.S. Army (1852–1893)

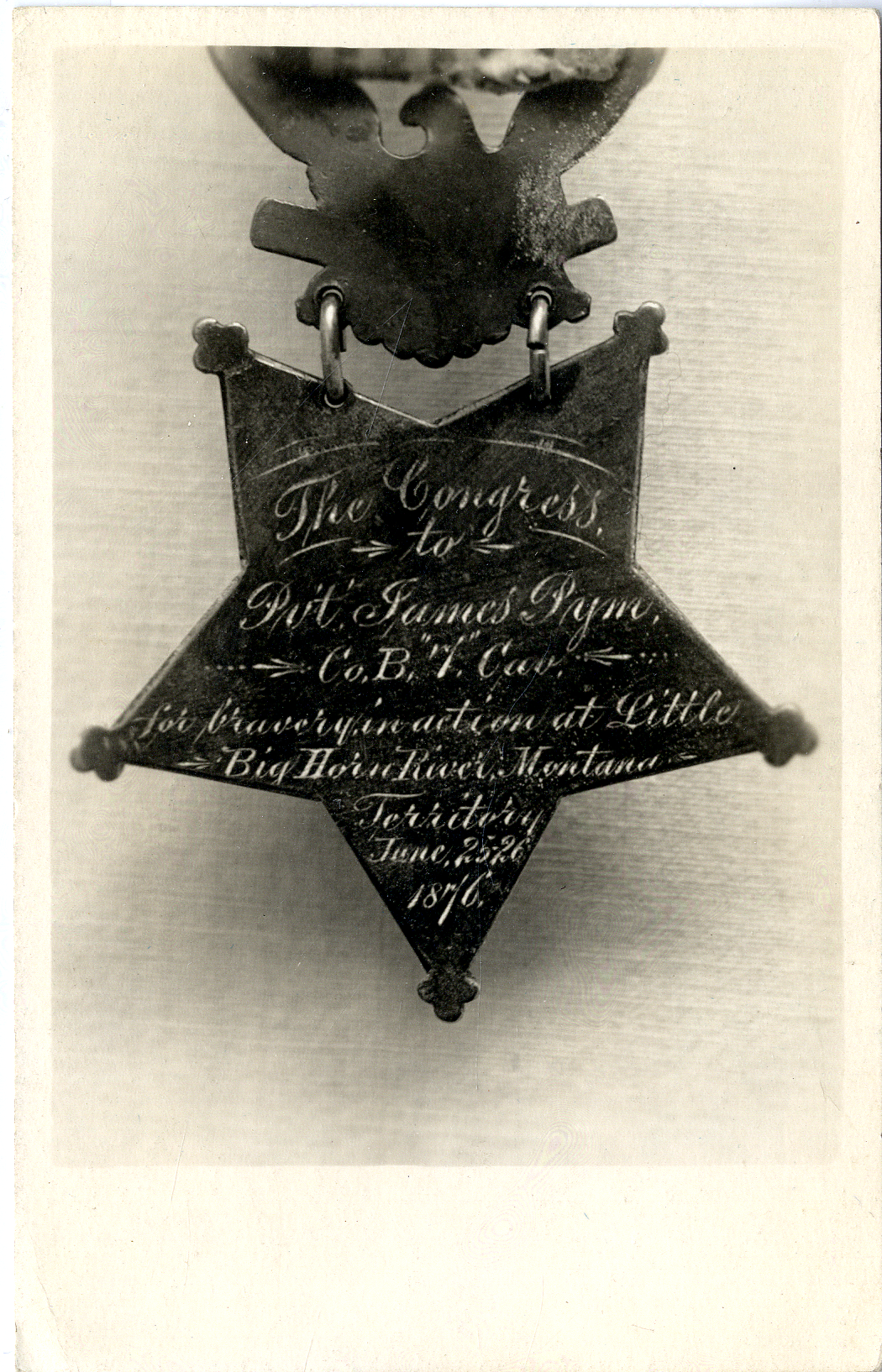
- Pym's Medal of Honor
- Born: 1847; Oxfordshire, England, United Kingdom
- Died: November 29, 1893 (aged 41); Miles City, Montana, United States
- Burial place: Custer National Cemetery
- Military career
- Allegiance: United States of America
- Branch: United States Army
- Service years: 1874–1879
- Rank: Private
- Unit: 7th U.S. Cavalry
- Conflicts: Indian Wars; Great Sioux War of 1876-77
- Awards: Medal of Honor

Private James Pym (1852 – November 29, 1893) was a British-born soldier in the U.S. Army who served with the 7th U.S. Cavalry during the Great Sioux War of 1876-77. He was one of twenty-four men who received the Medal of Honor for gallantry, Pym being among those who volunteered to carry water from the Little Bighorn River to wounded soldiers on Reno Hill, at the Battle of the Little Bighorn on June 25, 1876.

== Biography ==
James Pym was born in Garsington, Oxfordshire on November 7, 1847. According to historian Peter G. Russell, he may have served in the British Army and changed the date of his birth after leaving the country. Emigrating to the United States, he enlisted as a private in the U.S. Army in Boston, Massachusetts on December 11, 1874. Pym saw action with the 7th U.S. Cavalry Regiment during the Great Sioux War of 1876-77 and, at the Battle of the Little Bighorn on June 26, 1876, was one of fifteen soldiers who volunteered to carry water to wounded soldiers at the Reno-Benteen site. Five sharpshooters put themselves in an exposed position to cover Pym and the other men as they spent four hours carrying water in cast iron canteens and cookware 80 yards from the Little Bighorn River to Reno Hill under heavy fire. The men were ambushed by Sioux warriors, concealed in bushes along the river, and Pym was wounded in the right ankle. He and the rest of the Little Bighorn water carriers were among the twenty-four members who received the Medal of Honor for gallantry on October 5, 1878.

After leaving the army in late 1879, Pym lived in Minnesota for a time and married. He and his bride then moved to Livingston and eventually settled in Miles City, Montana where the couple rented a cabin. The former cavalryman soon established a reputation as "being someone not to mess with". According to one story, Pym disarmed a man who had pulled a gun on him and ran him out of town. Pym and his wife attempted to open a restaurant in Miles City, but after this failed, she left and Pym began drinking heavily. On November 29, 1893, he was killed by Alvah Tilton after Pym confronted the man in the home of his wife's sister. It was discovered that he was an MOH recipient when the coroner discovered the medal pinned to Pym's body upon examination. He is one of two MOH recipients, along with double recipient Henry Hogan, who are buried at Custer County Cemetery. A biography of his life was written by historian Peter G. Russell and later published by The Custer Association of Great Britain for its biannual journal The Crow's Nest.

In the fall of 2009, Eastern Montana Veterans Cemetery staff asked Ed Saunders, a retired Army officer living in Montana who specializes in researching and preparing cases for medals for military veterans, to investigate the grave sites of Pym and First Sergeant Henry Hogan, a dual Medal of Honor recipient also buried in Custer County Cemetery, to see if both their weathered and barely legible Medal of Honor headstones could be replaced. Neither Pym nor Hogan had any known relatives to petition the government to replace them, so Saunders prepared cases for both men and wrote to the U.S. Veterans' Administration himself. After seven months, officials granted Saunders' request and the new headstones arrived in time for Memorial Day, 2010. Saunders and Kurt Holmlund, superintendent of Eastern Montana State Veterans Cemetery, both replaced the newer headstones with assistance from the local community.

== Medal of Honor citation ==
Rank and organization: Private, Company B, 7th U.S. Cavalry. Place and date: At Little Big Horn River, Mont., 25–26 June 1876. Entered service at: Boston, Mass. Birth: Oxfordshire, England. Date of issue: 5 October 1878.

Citation:

Voluntarily went for water and secured the same under heavy fire.

== See also ==
- List of Medal of Honor recipients for the Indian Wars
