= Julius Stickoffer =

Swiss-born American soldier in the U.S. Army

Julius H. Stickoffer
- Born: c. 1845; Switzerland
- Died: September 23, 1925 (aged 80); Yountville, California, United States
- Burial place: Veterans Memorial Grove Cemetery
- Military career
- Allegiance: United States of America
- Branch: United States Army
- Service years: 1866–1871, 1872
- Rank: Saddler
- Unit: 8th U.S. Cavalry
- Conflicts: Indian Wars; Black Hawk War
- Awards: Medal of Honor

Julius Henry Stickoffer (c. 1845 – September 3, 1925) was a Swiss-born American soldier in the U.S. Army who served as a saddler with the 8th U.S. Cavalry during the Black Hawk War. Stickoffer was cited for gallantry in action against hostile Indians at Cienaga Springs in the Utah Territory on November 11, 1868, for which he received the Medal of Honor two years later. He was the only member of the United States armed forces to win the award during the seven-year conflict.

== Biography ==
Stickoffer was born in Switzerland circa 1845, and later emigrated to the United States where he settled in Cincinnati, Ohio. He joined the United States Army from that city in November 1866 and was assigned to Company L of the 8th U.S. Cavalry Regiment as a saddler. Sent to the Utah Territory for frontier duty, he took part in campaigns against the Ute, Paiute and Navajo tribes under led the Ute chieftain Antonga Black Hawk. On November 11, 1868, he and members of the 8th U.S. Cavalry battled the Indians at Cienaga Springs. Stickoffer won distinction during the fight and was awarded the Medal of Honor for "gallantry in action" on March 3, 1870. He was the only one to receive the award during the U.S. Army's entire Indian campaign in Utah. He was discharged in November 1871. He re-enlisted in February 1872, but deserted in September of that year, eventually moved to Yountville, California where he lived until his death on September 3, 1925. He is one of three MOH winners, along with Sergeants Joseph Leonard and John Moriarity, buried at Veterans Memorial Grove Cemetery.

== Medal of Honor citation ==
Rank and organization: Saddler, Company L, 8th U.S. Cavalry. Place and date: At Cienaga Springs, Utah, 11 November 1868. Entered service at:--. Birth: Switzerland. Date of issue: 3 March 1870.

Gallantry in action.

== See also ==
- List of Medal of Honor recipients for the Indian Wars
