= Wounded Knee Creek =

Stream in South Dakota, United States

Coordinates: 43.4364°N 102.5453°W

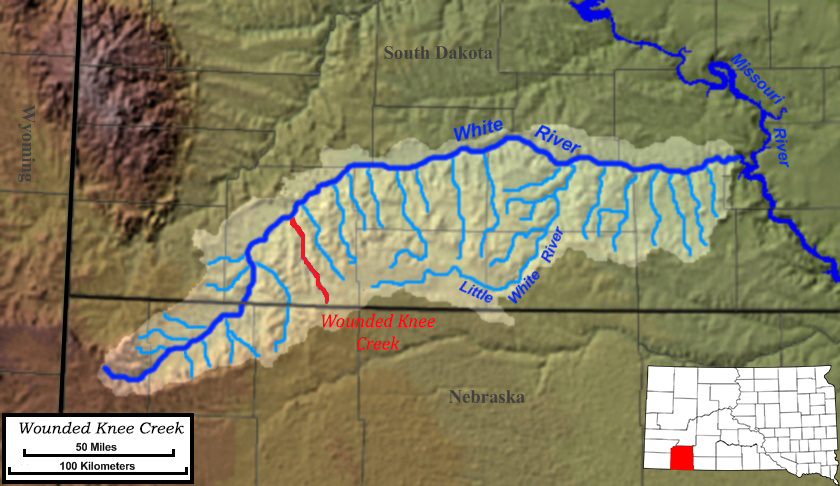
The Wounded Knee Creek is shown highlighted in red.

Wounded Knee Creek is a tributary of the White River, approximately 100 miles (160 km) long, in Oglala Lakota County, South Dakota in the United States. Its Lakota name is Čhaŋkpé Ópi Wakpála.

The creek's name recalls an incident when a Native American sustained an injury to his knee during a fight.

The creek rises in the southwestern corner of the Pine Ridge Indian Reservation, along the state line with Nebraska, and flows northwest. It borders the site of the 1890 Wounded Knee Massacre, in which United States Army troops from the 7th Cavalry Regiment massacred approximately 300 Lakota people, most of whom were unarmed women and children. Towns in this region include Wounded Knee and Manderson. The Wounded Knee Creek flows NNW across the reservation and joins the White south of Badlands National Park.

== See also ==
- List of rivers of South Dakota
- Wounded Knee incident
