= Adolphe Libaire =

- Born: May 2, 1840; Baccarat, France
- Died: September 5, 1920 (aged 80)
- Burial place: Green-Wood Cemetery, Brooklyn, New York, US
- Military career
- Allegiance: United States of America; Union
- Branch: United States Army; Union Army
- Service years: 1861–1863
- Rank: Captain
- Units: (New York (state)) Company E, 9th New York Volunteer Infantry Regiment
- Conflicts: American Civil War
- Awards: Medal of Honor

Adolphe Libaire (May 2, 1840 – September 5, 1920) was a captain in the Union Army and a Medal of Honor recipient for his actions in the American Civil War.

Libaire was commissioned into the 9th New York Infantry in July 1861 and mustered out with his regiment in May 1863.

== Medal of Honor citation ==
Rank and organization: Captain, Company E, 9th New York Infantry. Place and date: At Antietam, Md., September 17, 1862. Entered service at: New York, N.Y. Birth:------. Date of issue: April 2, 1898.

Citation:

In the advance on the enemy and after his color bearer and the entire color guard of 8 men had been shot down, this officer seized the regimental flag and with conspicuous gallantry carried it to the extreme front, urging the line forward.

== See also ==
- List of American Civil War Medal of Honor recipients: G–L
