= Thomas Cosgrove =

Irish soldier, Medal of Honor recipient

- Born: June 12, 1829; County Galway, Ireland
- Died: March 27, 1912 (aged 83); Lexington, Massachusetts
- Military career
- Allegiance: United States of America
- Branch: United States Army; Union Army
- Service years: 1862 - 1865
- Rank: Private
- Unit: 40th Massachusetts Volunteer Infantry Regiment
- Awards: Medal of Honor

Thomas Cosgrove (June 12, 1829 – March 27, 1912) was an Irish soldier who received the Medal of Honor for valor during the American Civil War.

== Biography ==
Cosgrove joined the Army from Stoughton, Massachusetts in August 1862, and mustered out with his regiment in June 1865. He received the Medal of Honor on November 7, 1896, for his actions at Drury's Bluff, Virginia on May 15, 1864.

== Medal of Honor citation ==
Citation:

Individually demanded and received the surrender of 7 armed Confederates concealed in a cellar, disarming and marching them in as prisoners of war.

== See also ==
- List of American Civil War Medal of Honor recipients: A-F
