= Thomas Cullen (Medal of Honor) =

US Medal of Honor winner 26 Feb 1839- 17 Aug 1913

- Born: February 26, 1839; Ireland
- Died: August 17, 1913 (aged 74); Coudersport, Pennsylvania
- Burial place: Saint Mary's Cemetery
- Military career
- Allegiance: United States of America
- Branch: United States Army
- Service years: 1861–1865
- Rank: Corporal
- Unit: (New York (state)) 82nd New York Volunteer Infantry Regiment
- Conflicts: Battle of Bristoe Station
- Awards: Medal of Honor

Corporal Thomas Cullen (February 26, 1839 – August 17, 1913) was an Irish soldier who fought in the American Civil War. Cullen received the United States' highest award for bravery during combat, the Medal of Honor, for his action at Bristoe Station in Virginia on October 14, 1863. He was honored with the award on December 1, 1864.

== Biography ==
Cullen was born in Ireland on February 26, 1839. He joined the 82nd New York Volunteer Infantry Regiment in May 1861. He was wounded in the Battle of Gettysburg, and captured in the Battle of Jerusalem Plank Road. After his parole in July 1864, he was transferred to the 59th New York Volunteer Infantry Regiment, and mustered out in June 1865. Cullen died in Coudersport, Pennsylvania, on August 17, 1913, and his remains are interred at the Saint Mary's Cemetery in Pennsylvania.

== See also ==
- List of American Civil War Medal of Honor recipients: A–F
