= Ship's carpenter =

Ship crewman responsible for maintaining wooden structures

Ship's carpenter is a post aboard ships, both naval and commercial, responsible for the maintenance and repair of the ship's wooden parts, as well as its water stocks.

In the late 19th century, typical activities for a ship's carpenter included caulking the ship's boats, repairing masts and other wooden pieces of the ship, maintaining paddles, and other miscellaneous tasks of carpentry as may be required.

The most important task for a carpenter was maintenance of the ship's hull from attack from barnacles and ship worm. Whalers employed carpenters to carry out emergency repairs.

== Merchant vessels ==
In the late 19th century, almost all merchant vessels of a large size or on a long voyage carried a carpenter. The carpenter may or may not have been a seaman, thus either requiring or excusing him from ship's duties. While not an officer, the carpenter maintained a degree of privilege on the ship and was answerable only to the ship's master in terms of his carpentry duties.

== Royal Navy ==
The ship's carpenter on the Mary Rose had his own cabin, in which tools such as his adze and his brace and bit were discovered.

Carpenters were warrant officers until the end of the Second World War.

Carpenters were unusual in that many of them passed part of their careers as civilian employees of the Navy Board in the dockyards, and part as officers in the Navy. Although it was possible to serve an apprenticeship afloat as Carpenter's Crew and Carpenter's Mate, the majority qualified as shipwrights in the dockyards before going to sea, and some of the Master Shipwrights and their Assistants were former Carpenters who had returned to the yards.

In the 20th century, with the adoption of metal as the general material for ship construction, carpenters no longer dealt with wood on board ships. In 1918 they were renamed Warrant Shipwrights.

Titles per rank
Rank	Title
Petty Officer	Carpenter's Mate
Warrant Rank	Carpenter
Sub-Lieutenant	Chief Carpenter (1865)
Lieutenant	Carpenter Lieutenant (1903)
Lieutenant-Commander	Carpenter Lieutenant (1903)
Commander	Shipwright Commander (1918)

== United States ==
Carpenter's mate
- Issued by: United States Navy
- Type: Enlisted rating
- Abbreviation: CM
- Specialty: Hull

Carpenter's mate (CM) was a United States Navy rating throughout the 19th century and the first half of the 20th century.

The rating was established in 1797, and separate pay grades were implemented in 1893. The sleeve insignia for the rating depicted two crossed axes. Responsibilities of carpenter's mates included maintaining ship ventilation, watertight control, painting, and drainage. During the era of wooden ships, carpenter's mates were charged with maintaining the integrity of the ship's hull. In times of battle, carpenter's mates would fight fires and use plugs to patch holes in the hull. In 1948, the rating was changed to damage controlman.
