= Volz =

Volz is a surname, and people with the surname include:

- Albert Volz (1871-1971), American businessman and politician
- Chris Volz (born 1973), American songwriter and lead vocalist of Flaw
- David Volz (born 1962), American pole vaulter
- Eric Volz (born 1979)
- Ferdinand E. Volz (1823–1876), mayor of Pittsburgh, Pennsylvania
- Greg X. Volz (born 1950), Christian rock singer
- Helmut Volz (1911–1978), German experimental nuclear physicist
- Jacob Volz (1889–1965), Philippine–American War Medal of Honor recipient
- John Volz (1935–2011), American attorney from Louisiana
- Lenore Volz (1913–2009), German theologian
- Moritz Volz (born 1983), German footballer
- Nedra Volz (1908–2003), American actress
- Robert Volz (1875–?), American Medal of Honor recipient
- Wilbur Volz (1924–2015), American football player
- Wolfgang Völz (1930-2018), German actor

== See also ==
- Voltz (disambiguation)
