= W. S. West =

W. S. West may refer to:

- Walter Scott West (1872–1943), US Marine Corps private, recipient of the Medal of Honor for actions during the Spanish–American War
- William Stanley West (1849–1914), United States Senator for Georgia
