= Alexander Jardine =

Alexander Jardine may refer to:

- Alexander William Jardine (1843–1920), Australian engineer and geographer
- Alexander Jardine (British Army officer) (died 1799), Scottish army officer and author
- Alexander Jardine (Medal of Honor) (1874–1949), US Navy fireman and Medal of Honor recipient
- Alexander Jardine of the Jardine baronets
