= Vadas =

Vadas is a surname. Notable people with the surname include:

- Albert Vadas (1876–1946), United States Navy sailor
- Kenny Vadas (born 1981), Canadian actor
- József Vadas (1911–2006), Hungarian former sprinter
- Miklós Vadas (1906–1981), Hungarian footballer and coach

== See also ==
- Vada (disambiguation)
