= George Bright =

George Bright may refer to:

- George Washington Bright (1874–1949), American sailor and Medal of Honor recipient
- George Adams Bright (1837–1905), United States Navy officer and surgeon
- George Bright (priest) (died 1696), Dean of St Asaph
- George M. Bright, suspect in the 1958 Hebrew Benevolent Congregation Temple bombing
- George Bright (actor), English stage actor of the 17th century
