= David Barrow =

David Barrow may refer to:

- David Crenshaw Barrow Jr. (1852–1929), American educator, chancellor of the University of Georgia
- David D. Barrow (1876–1948), American sailor and Medal of Honor recipient
- David Francis Barrow (1888–1970), American mathematician
- Dave Barrow (1947–2022), Canadian politician, mayor of Richmond Hill, Ontario, Canada
