= William Spicer (Medal of Honor) =

- Born: May 28, 1864; Liverpool, England
- Died: December 14, 1949 (aged 85)
- Military career
- Allegiance: United States of America
- Branch: United States Navy
- Rank: Gunner's Mate First Class
- Unit: USS Marblehead (C-11)
- Conflicts: Spanish–American War
- Awards: Medal of Honor

William Spicer (May 28, 1864 – December 14, 1949) was a gunner's mate first class serving in the United States Navy during the Spanish–American War who received the Medal of Honor for bravery. He was the great-grandfather of former White House Press Secretary Sean Spicer.

== Biography ==
Spicer was born May 28, 1864, in Liverpool, England, and was living in New York City when he enlisted in the U.S. Navy on November 27, 1890. He served in the Spanish–American War aboard the USS Marblehead (C-11) as a gunner's mate first class.

== Medal of Honor citation ==
Rank and organization: Gunner's Mate First Class, U.S. Navy. Born: 28 May 1864, England. Accredited to. New York. G.O. No.: 500, 14 December 1898.

Citation:

On board the U.S.S. Marblehead at the approaches to Caimanera, Guantanamo Bay, Cuba, 26 and 27 July 1898. Displaying heroism, Spicer took part in the perilous work of sweeping for and disabling 27 contact mines during this period.

== See also ==
- List of Medal of Honor recipients for the Spanish–American War
