= Michael Kearney (Medal of Honor) =

- Born: October 4, 1874; Newmarket, Ireland
- Died: October 21, 1937 (aged 63)
- Burial place: Holy Cross Cemetery, Brooklyn, New York
- Military career
- Allegiance: United States of America
- Branch: United States Marine Corps
- Service years: 1896 - 1926
- Rank: Captain
- Unit: USS Nashville
- Conflicts: Spanish–American War
- Awards: Medal of Honor

Michael Kearney (October 4, 1874 – October 21, 1937) was a private serving in the United States Marine Corps during the Spanish–American War who received the Medal of Honor for bravery.

== Biography ==
Kearney was born on October 4, 1874, in Newmarket, Ireland. He joined the Marine Corps from Boston in April 1896, and retired with the rank of captain in December 1926.

Kearney died on October 21, 1937, and is buried at Holy Cross Cemetery in Brooklyn, New York.

== Medal of Honor citation ==
Rank and organization: Private, U.S. Marine Corps. Born: 4 October 1874, Newmarket, Ireland. Accredited to: Massachusetts. G.O. No.: 521, 7 July 1899.

Citation:

On board the U.S.S. Nashville during the operation of cutting the cable leading from Cienfuegos, Cuba, 11 May 1898. Facing the heavy fire of the enemy, Kearney set an example of extraordinary bravery and coolness throughout this action.

== See also ==
- List of Medal of Honor recipients for the Spanish–American War
