= James H. Bennett =

- Born: August 11, 1877; New York City, New York
- Military career
- Allegiance: United States of America
- Branch: United States Navy
- Rank: Chief Boatswain's Mate
- Conflicts: Spanish–American War
- Awards: Medal of Honor

James Harvey Bennett (born August 11, 1877) was an American sailor serving in the United States Navy during the Spanish–American War who received the Medal of Honor for bravery.

== Biography ==
Bennett was born August 11, 1877, in New York City, New York. After entering the navy, he was sent to fight in the Spanish–American War aboard the USS Marblehead as a Chief Boatswain's Mate.

== Medal of Honor citation ==
Rank and Organization: Chief Boatswain's Mate, U.S. Navy. Born: August 11, 1877, New York, N.Y. Accredited to: New York. G.O. No.: 521, July 7, 1899.

Citation:

On board the U.S.S. Marblehead during the cutting of the cable leading from Cienfuegos, Cuba, 11 May 1898. Facing the heavy fire of the enemy, Bennett set an example of extraordinary bravery and coolness throughout this action.

== See also ==
- List of Medal of Honor recipients for the Spanish–American War
