= Joseph E. Carter =

US Navy sailor and Medal of Honor recipient (1875–1950)

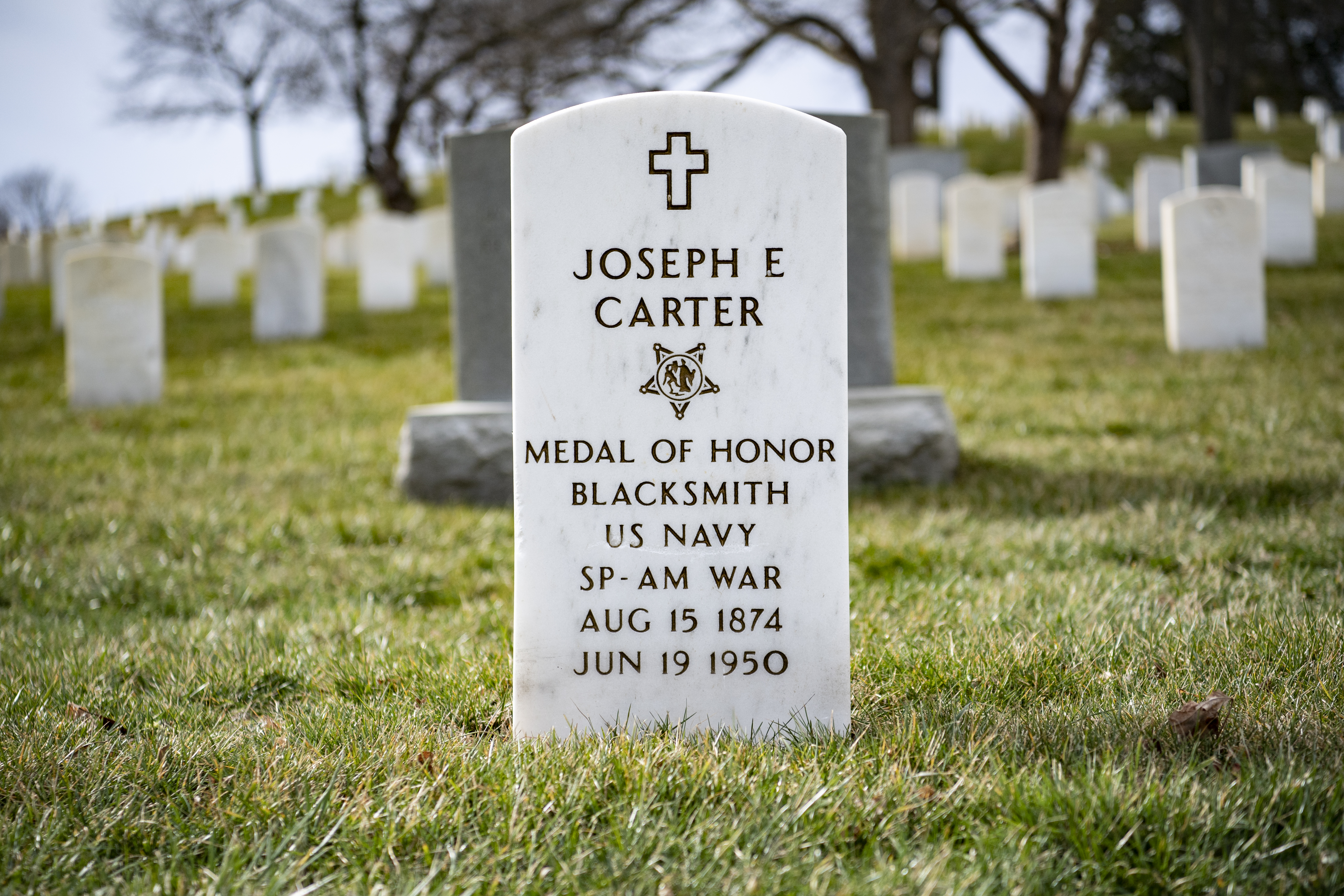
- Grave at Arlington National Cemetery
- Born: August 15, 1875; Manchester, England
- Died: June 19, 1950 (aged 74)
- Burial place: Arlington National Cemetery, Arlington, Virginia
- Military career
- Allegiance: United States of America
- Branch: United States Navy
- Rank: Blacksmith
- Unit: U.S.S. Marblehead
- Conflicts: Spanish–American War
- Awards: Medal of Honor

Joseph Edward Carter (August 15, 1875 – June 19, 1950) was an American sailor serving in the United States Navy during the Spanish–American War who received the Medal of Honor for bravery.

== Biography ==
Carter was born August 15, 1875, in Manchester, England, and after entering the navy he was sent as a Blacksmith to fight in the Spanish–American War aboard the USS Marblehead.

He died June 19, 1950, and was buried at Arlington National Cemetery, Arlington, Virginia.

== Medal of Honor citation ==
Rank and organization: Blacksmith, U.S. Navy. Born: 15 August 1875, Manchester, England. Accredited: North Dakota. G.O. No.: 521, 7 July 1899.

Citation:

On board the U.S.S. Marblehead during the operation of cutting the cable leading from Cienfuegos, Cuba, 11 May 1898. Facing the heavy fire of the enemy, Carter set an example of extraordinary bravery and coolness throughout this action.

== See also ==
- List of Medal of Honor recipients for the Spanish–American War
