= Henry Hendrickson =

- Born: March 12, 1862; Germany
- Died: February 28, 1912 (aged 49); Boston, Massachusetts, U.S.
- Burial place: Mount Hope Cemetery, Mattapan, Massachusetts, U.S.
- Military career
- Allegiance: United States
- Branch: United States Navy
- Rank: Seaman
- Nickname: "Harry"
- Unit: U.S.S. Marblehead
- Conflicts: Spanish–American War
- Awards: Medal of Honor

Henry Hendrickson (March 12, 1862 – February 28, 1912) was a seaman serving in the United States Navy during the Spanish–American War who received the Medal of Honor for bravery.

== Biography ==
Henry "Harry" Hendrickson was born as Uno Henrik Toivonen on March 12, 1862, in Pori, Finland. He went to sea in about 1892 and survived the shipwreck of the Norwegian ship SS Franklin in Townsville Harbour, Queensland in July 1893. After immigrating into the United States and entering the navy was sent to fight in the Spanish–American War aboard the U.S.S. Marblehead as a seaman.

On May 11, 1898, the Marblehead was given the task of cutting the cable leading from Cienfuegos, Cuba. During the operation and facing heavy enemy fire, he continued to perform his duties throughout this action. He suffered a bullet wound on his left arm and on his belly, and stayed two weeks in a New York hospital.

He married Anna Gustava Kiljunen (born on June 21, 1875, in Haapavesi, Finland) in Manhattan, New York City, on March 3, 1900. The US Census 1900 show them living in the Borough of Brooklyn, occupation rigger.

They returned to Pori, Finland and had two children there before emigrating again. We don't know the departure of Harry but his wife immigrated with the children in 1903. They arrived in Boston aboard RMS Saxonia (1899) of the Cunard Line on August 20, 1903.

Harry died in Boston, Massachusetts, on February 28, 1912, and is buried at Mount Hope Cemetery in Mattapan, Massachusetts.

== Medal of Honor citation ==
Rank and organization: Seaman, U.S. Navy. Born: 12 March 1862, Germany. G.O. No.: 521, 7 July 1899.

N.B. The citation has got his birthday and birthplace wrong.

Citation:

On board the U.S.S. Marblehead during the operation of cutting the cable leading from Cienfuegos, Cuba, 11 May 1898. Facing the heavy fire of the enemy, Hendrickson displayed extraordinary bravery and coolness throughout this action.

== See also ==
- List of Medal of Honor recipients for the Spanish–American War
