= Austin J. Durney =

Austin Joseph Durney
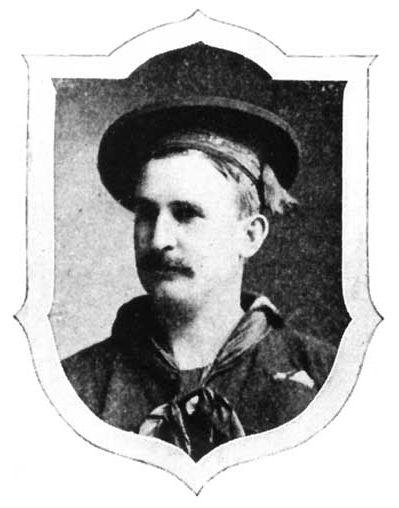
- Blacksmith Austin J. Durney
- Born: November 26, 1867; Philadelphia, Pennsylvania, US
- Died: November 17, 1926 (aged 58); Ridgely, Maryland, US
- Burial place: Old Saint Joseph Cemetery, Cordova, Maryland
- Military career
- Allegiance: United States
- Branch: United States Navy
- Service years: 1890–1900
- Rank: Blacksmith
- Unit: USS Nashville (PG-7)
- Conflicts: Spanish–American War
- Awards: Medal of Honor

Austin Joseph Durney (November 26, 1867 – November 17, 1926) was a United States Navy sailor and a recipient of America's highest military decoration, the Medal of Honor.

== Biography ==
Austin Durney was born on November 26, 1867, at Philadelphia, Pennsylvania. He enlisted in the U.S. Navy from the state of Maryland in 1890, and served during the Spanish–American War on board the gunboat USS Nashville (PG-7). On May 11, 1898, Blacksmith Durney was one of several men who participated in a boat expedition that cut the underwater telegraph cable off Cienfuegos, Cuba. For his "extraordinary bravery and coolness" under enemy fire during this operation, he was awarded the Medal of Honor. He was discharged from the Navy in 1900.

Austin J. Durney died on November 17, 1926, at Ridgely, Maryland, and was buried in Old Saint Joseph Cemetery, Cordova, Maryland.

== Medal of Honor citation ==
Rank and organization: Blacksmith, U.S. Navy. Born: November 26, 1867, Philadelphia, Pa. Entered service at: Woodland, Mo. G.O. No.: 521, July 7, 1899.

Citation:

On board the U.S.S. Nashville during the operation of cutting the cable leading from Cienfuegos, Cuba, May 11, 1898. Facing the heavy fire of the enemy, Durney set an example of extraordinary bravery and coolness throughout this action.

== See also ==
- List of Medal of Honor recipients for the Spanish–American War
