= Daniel Campbell (Medal of Honor) =

Daniel J. Campbell
- Born: December 26, 1874; Prince Edward Island, Canada
- Died: April 28, 1955 (aged 80)
- Burial place: Mount Hope Cemetery, Mattapan, Massachusetts
- Military career
- Allegiance: United States of America
- Branch: United States Marine Corps
- Service years: 1896 - 1901
- Rank: Private
- Unit: USS Marblehead
- Conflicts: Spanish–American War
- Awards: Medal of Honor

Daniel J. Campbell (December 26, 1874 – April 28, 1955) was a private serving in the United States Marine Corps during the Spanish–American War who received the Medal of Honor for bravery.

== Biography ==
Campbell was born on December 26, 1874, in Prince Edward Island, Canada. He joined the Marine Corps from Boston in August 1896, and was honorably discharged in October 1901.

Campbell died on April 28, 1955, and was buried at Mount Hope Cemetery in Mattapan, Massachusetts.

== Medal of Honor citation ==
Rank and organization: Private, U.S. Marine Corps. Born: 26 October 1874, Prince Edward Island, Canada. Accredited to: Massachusetts. G.O. No.: 521, 7 July 1899.

Citation:

On board the U.S.S. Marblehead during the cutting of the cable leading from Cienfuegos, Cuba, 11 May 1898. Facing the heavy fire of the enemy, Campbell set an example of extraordinary bravery and coolness throughout this action.

== See also ==
- List of Medal of Honor recipients for the Spanish–American War
