= John Maxwell (Medal of Honor) =

- Born: June 21, 1874; Lanarkshire, Scotland
- Died: November 13, 1931 (aged 57); Westbury, Long Island
- Burial place: Westbury Friends Cemetery Westbury, New York
- Military career
- Allegiance: United States
- Branch: United States Navy
- Rank: Fireman Second Class
- Unit: U.S.S. Marblehead
- Conflicts: Spanish–American War
- Awards: Medal of Honor

John Maxwell (June 21, 1874 – November 13, 1931) was a fireman second class serving in the United States Navy during the Spanish–American War who received the Medal of Honor for bravery.

== Biography ==
Maxwell was born June 21, 1874, in Scotland, and, after entering the navy was sent as a fireman second class to fight in the Spanish–American War aboard the U.S.S. Marblehead.

He died November 13, 1931, and is buried in Westbury Friends Cemetery Westbury, New York.

== Medal of Honor citation ==
Rank and organization: Fireman Second Class, U.S. Navy. Born: 21 June 1874, Lanarkshire, Scotland, U.K. G.O. No.: 521, 7 July 1899.

Citation:

On board the U.S.S. Marblehead during the operation of cutting the cable leading from Cienfuegos, Cuba, 11 May 1898. Facing the heavy fire of the enemy, Maxwell displayed extraordinary bravery and coolness throughout this action.

Maxwell later was chauffeur to John Jacob Astor, a job he received through his good friend, Theodore Roosevelt. Roosevelt finally received HIS citation in 2006 for his actions at Santiago, more commonly referred to as "San Juan Hill".

== See also ==
- List of Medal of Honor recipients for the Spanish–American War
