= Ernest Krause =

US Navy Medal of Honor recipient

- Born: July 3, 1866; Lübeck, Germany
- Died: Unknown
- Military career
- Allegiance: United States
- Branch: United States Navy
- Rank: Coxswain
- Unit: USS Nashville (PG-7)
- Conflicts: Spanish–American War
- Awards: Medal of Honor

Ernest Krause (July 3, 1866 – unknown) was an American coxswain serving in the United States Navy during the Spanish–American War who received the Medal of Honor for his bravery.

== Biography ==
Born on July 3, 1866, in Lübeck, Germany, Krause was living in New York City when he enlisted in the U.S. Navy. He served in the Spanish–American War aboard the USS Nashville (PG-7) as a coxswain.

On May 11, 1898, Nashville was given the task of cutting the cable leading from Cienfuegos, Cuba. During the operation and facing heavy enemy fire, Krause continued to perform his duties throughout this action.

In January 1907, Krause was "discharged less than honorably" while stationed in Portsmouth, New Hampshire.

== Medal of Honor citation ==
Rank and organization: Coxswain, U.S. Navy. Born: 3 July 1866, Germany. Accredited to: New York. G.O. No.: 521, 7 July 1899.

Citation:

On board the U.S.S. Nashville during the operation of cutting the cable leading from Cienfuegos, Cuba, 11 May 1898. Facing the heavy fire of the enemy, Krause displayed extraordinary bravery and coolness throughout this action.

== See also ==
- List of Medal of Honor recipients for the Spanish–American War
