= Thomas Kelly (Medal of Honor, 1898) =

US Army sergeant (1871–1920)

- Born: Ireland
- Died: December 17, 1920
- Burial place: Plattsburg Barracks Post Cemetery, Plattsburgh, New York
- Military career
- Allegiance: United States of America
- Branch: United States Army
- Rank: Sergeant First Class
- Unit: 21st Infantry Regiment
- Conflicts: Spanish–American War
- Awards: Medal of Honor

Thomas Kelly (March 17, 1871 – December 17, 1920) was a private serving in the United States Army during the Spanish–American War who received the Medal of Honor for bravery.

== Biography ==
Kelly was born in Ireland sometime prior to 1898 and after immigrating to the United States, entered the army from New York City. He was sent to fight in the Spanish–American War with Company H, 21st U.S. Infantry as a private where he received the Medal of Honor for his actions.

He died December 17, 1920, and is buried in Plattsburg Barracks Post Cemetery Plattsburgh, New York.

== Medal of Honor citation ==
Rank and organization: Private, Company H, 21st U.S. Infantry. Place and date: At Santiago de Cuba, 1 July 1898. Entered service at: New York, N.Y. Birth: Ireland. Date of issue: 22 June 1899.

Citation:

Gallantly assisted in the rescue of the wounded from in front of the lines and while under heavy fire from the enemy.

== See also ==
- List of Medal of Honor recipients for the Spanish–American War
