= Andrew J. Cummins =

United States Army Medal of Honor recipient (1868–1923)

Andrew Johnson Cummins
- Born: December 6, 1868; Alexandria, Indiana, U.S.
- Died: September 15, 1923 (aged 54); Lewiston, Montana, U.S.
- Military career
- Allegiance: United States
- Branch: United States Army
- Service years: 1891–1899
- Rank: Sergeant
- Units: Company F, 10th U.S. Infantry
- Conflicts: Spanish–American War
- Awards: Medal of Honor

Andrew Johnson Cummins (December 6, 1868 – September 15, 1923) was a sergeant serving in the United States Army during the Spanish–American War who received the Medal of Honor for bravery.

== Biography ==
Cummins was born December 6, 1868, in Alexandria, Indiana, and joined the Army from Columbus, Ohio, in January 1891. He served in the Spanish–American War with Company F, 10th U.S. Infantry as a sergeant, and received the Medal of Honor for assisting in the rescue of wounded while under enemy fire. He was discharged in January 1899.

Cummins died September 15, 1923.

== Medal of Honor citation ==
Rank and organization: Sergeant, Company F, 10th U.S. Infantry. Place and date: At Santiago, Cuba, 1 July 1898. Entered service at: ______. Birth: Alexandria, Ind. Date of issue: 22 June 1899.

Citation:

Gallantly assisted in the rescue of the wounded from in front of the lines and under heavy fire of the enemy.

== See also ==
- List of Medal of Honor recipients for the Spanish–American War
