= Peter Johnson (Medal of Honor) =

- Born: December 29, 1857; Copenhagen, Denmark
- Died: June 21, 1943 (aged 85); Bexar County, Texas, US
- Burial place: San Antonio, Texas, US
- Military career
- Allegiance: United States
- Branch: United States Navy
- Rank: Fireman First Class
- Unit: U.S.S. Vixen
- Conflicts: Spanish–American War
- Awards: Medal of Honor

Peter Johnson (1857–1943) was a fireman first class serving in the United States Navy during the Spanish–American War who received the Medal of Honor for bravery.

== Biography ==
Johnson was born November 6, 1871, in Copenhagen Denmark. He married Anna Louise NN from England.

== Medal of Honor citation ==
Rank and organization: Fireman First Class, U.S. Navy. Born: 29 December 1857, Sumerland, England. Accredited to: Pennsylvania. G.O. No.: 167, 27 August 1904.

Citation:

On board the U.S.S. Vixen on the night of 28 May 1898. Following the explosion of the lower front manhole gasket of boiler A of the vessel, Johnson displayed great coolness and self-possession in entering the fireroom.

== See also ==
- List of Medal of Honor recipients for the Spanish–American War
