= Hermann Wilhelm Kuchneister =

Hermann W. Kuchmeister
- Born: October 16, 1877; Hamburg, Germany
- Died: February 1, 1923 (aged 45)
- Burial place: Winthrop Cemetery Winthrop, Massachusetts
- Military career
- Allegiance: United States of America
- Branch: United States Marine Corps
- Service years: 1897–1900
- Rank: Corporal
- Unit: USS Marblehead
- Conflicts: Spanish–American War
- Awards: Medal of Honor

Hermann William Kuchmeister (October 16, 1877 – February 1, 1923) was a private serving in the United States Marine Corps during the Spanish–American War who received the Medal of Honor for bravery.

== Biography ==
Kuchnmeister was born on October 16, 1877, in Hamburg, Germany. He joined the Marine Corps from Brooklyn in August 1897.

He was awarded the Medal of Honor for heroism during the cable cutting operation off Cienfuegos, Cuba while assigned to the cruiser USS Marblehead during the Spanish–American War. He was honorably discharged in March 1900.

He was a member of the Naval Order of the United States.

After being discharged from the Marine Corps, Kuchmeister worked as an assistant weigher for the U.S. Customs Service in Boston. On December 18, 1908, President Theodore Roosevelt issued Executive Order no. 992 which allowed Kuchmeister to be promoted to day inspector without further examination.

Kuchmeister died on February 1, 1923, and was buried at Winthrop Cemetery in Winthrop, Massachusetts.

== Medal of Honor citation ==
Rank and organization: Private, U.S. Marine Corps. Born: Hamburg, Germany. Accredited to: New York. G.O. No.: 521, 7 July 1899.

Citation:

On board the U.S.S. Marblehead during the operation of cutting the cable leading from Cienfuegos, Cuba, 11 May 1898. Facing the heavy fire of the enemy, Kuchmeister displayed extraordinary bravery and coolness throughout this action.

== Awards ==
- Medal of Honor
- Sampson Medal
- Spanish Campaign Medal

== See also ==
- List of Medal of Honor recipients for the Spanish–American War
