= John Fitzgerald (Medal of Honor) =

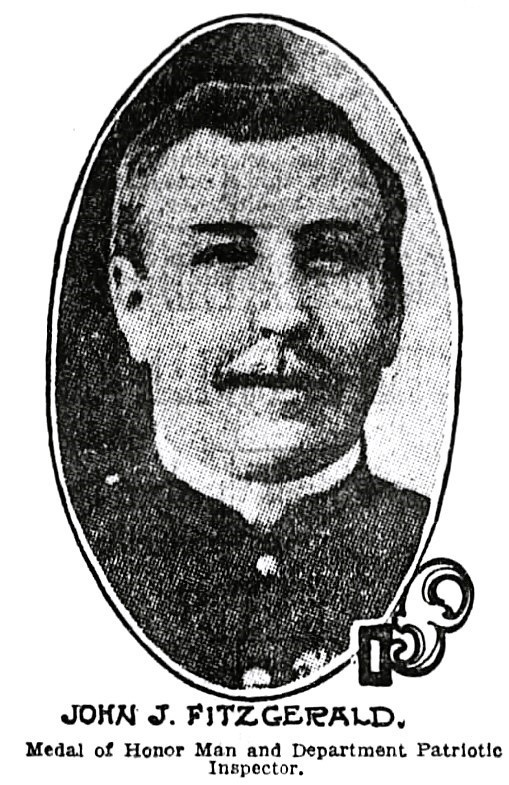
- John Fitzgerald portrait, 18 Jul 1915 Brooklyn, NY The Brooklyn Daily Eagle newspaper, page 4
- Born: March 17, 1873; Limerick, Ireland
- Died: April 19, 1948 (aged 75); New York City, US
- Burial place: Holy Cross Cemetery, Brooklyn, New York
- Military career
- Allegiance: United States
- Branch: United States Marine Corps
- Service years: 1894 - 1905
- Rank: Gunnery Sergeant
- Unit: United States Marine Corps
- Conflicts: Spanish–American War
- Awards: Medal of Honor

John Fitzgerald (March 17, 1873 – April 19, 1948) was a private serving in the United States Marine Corps during the Spanish–American War who received the Medal of Honor for bravery.

== Biography ==
Fitzgerald was born on March 17, 1873, in Limerick, Ireland. He joined the Marine Corps in December 1894, and was honorably discharged in February 1905.

Fitzgerald died on April 19, 1948.

== Medal of Honor citation ==
Rank and organization: Private, U.S. Marine Corps. Born: 17 March 1873, Limerick, Ireland. Accredited to: New York. G.O. No.: 92, 8 December 1910.

Citation:

For heroism and gallantry in action at Cuzco, Cuba, 14 June 1898.

== See also ==
- List of Medal of Honor recipients for the Spanish–American War
