= Joseph John Franklin =

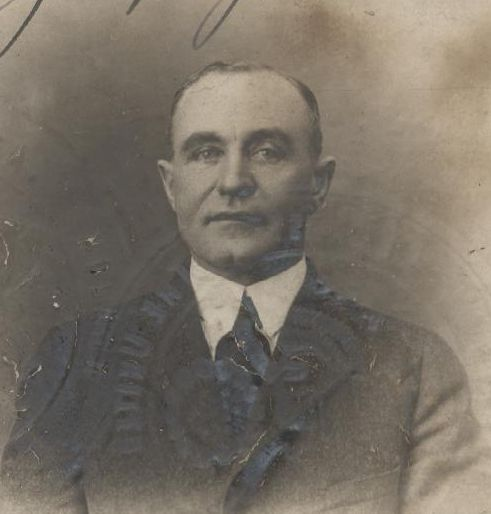
- Franklin circa 1918
- Born: June 18, 1870; Buffalo, New York, US
- Died: April 28, 1940 (aged 69); New York City, US
- Military career
- Allegiance: United States of America
- Branch: United States Marine Corps
- Service years: 1896 - 1929
- Rank: Sergeant Major
- Unit: USS Nashville (PG-7)
- Conflicts: Spanish–American War • Battle of Cienfuegos
- Awards: Medal of Honor

Joseph John Franklin (June 18, 1870 – April 28, 1940) was a United States Marine who received the Medal of Honor during the Spanish–American War.

== Biography ==
Franklin was born on June 18, 1870, in Buffalo, New York. He joined the Marine Corps from Boston in January 1896, and was awarded the Medal of Honor for his actions at the Battle of Cienfuegos. He retired with the rank of sergeant major in August 1929.

Franklin died on April 28, 1940.

== Medal of Honor citation ==
Rank and organization: Private, U.S. Marine Corps. Born: 18 June 1870, Buffalo, N.Y. Accredited to: New York. G.O. No.: 521, 7 July 1899.

Citation:

On board the U.S.S. Nashville during the operation of cutting the cable leading from Cienfuegos, Cuba, 11 May 1898. Facing the heavy fire of the enemy, Franklin set an example of extraordinary bravery and coolness throughout this action.

== See also ==
- List of Medal of Honor recipients for the Spanish–American War
