= George Frederick Mager =

- Born: February 23, 1875; Phillipsburg, New Jersey, US
- Died: April 12, 1938 (aged 63)
- Military career
- Allegiance: United States
- Branch: United States Navy
- Rank: Apprentice First Class
- Unit: U.S.S. Marblehead
- Conflicts: Spanish–American War
- Awards: Medal of Honor

George Frederick Mager (February 23, 1875 – April 12, 1938) was an apprentice first class serving in the United States Navy during the Spanish–American War who received the Medal of Honor for bravery.

== Biography ==
Mager was born February 23, 1875, in Phillipsburg, New Jersey and after entering the navy was sent to fight in the Spanish–American War aboard the USS Marblehead as an apprentice first class.

He died on April 12, 1938.

== Medal of Honor citation ==
Rank and organization: Apprentice First Class, U.S. Navy. Born: 23 February 1875, Philipsburg, N.J. Accredited to: New Jersey. G.O. No.: 529, 2 November 1899.

Citation:

On board the U.S.S. Marblehead during the operation of cutting the cable leading from Cienfuegos, Cuba, 11 May 1898. Facing the heavy fire of the enemy, Mager displayed extraordinary bravery and coolness throughout this action.

== See also ==
- List of Medal of Honor recipients for the Spanish–American War
