= List of Medal of Honor recipients for the Spanish–American War =

The Spanish–American War (Spanish: Guerra Hispano-Estadounidense, desastre del 98, Guerra Hispano-Cubana-Norteamericana or Guerra de Cuba ) was a military conflict between Spain and the United States that began in April 1898. Hostilities halted in August of that year, and the Treaty of Paris was signed in December.

The war began after the American demand for Spain's peacefully resolving the Cuban fight for independence was rejected, though strong expansionist sentiment in the United States may have motivated the government to target Spain's remaining overseas territories: Cuba, Puerto Rico, the Philippines, Guam and the Caroline Islands.

Riots in Havana by pro-Spanish "Voluntarios" gave the United States a reason to send in the warship USS Maine to indicate high national interest. Tension among the American people was raised because of the explosion of USS Maine, and "yellow journalism" that accused Spain of extensive atrocities, agitating American public opinion. The war ended after decisive naval victories for the United States in the Philippines and Cuba.

The Treaty of Paris ended the conflict 109 days after the outbreak of war giving the United States ownership of the former Spanish colonies of Puerto Rico, the Philippines and Guam.

The Medal of Honor was created during the American Civil War and is the highest military decoration presented by the United States government to a member of its armed forces. The recipient must have distinguished themselves at the risk of their own life above and beyond the call of duty in action against an enemy of the United States. Due to the nature of this medal, it is commonly presented posthumously.

== Recipients ==
During the Spanish–American War, a total of 112 Medal of Honor are awarded, including 1 was awarded posthumously. 31 for Army, 66 for Navy and 15 for Marine. This with the * indicates that the Medal of Honor was awarded posthumously

Image	Name	Service	Rank	Place of action	Date of action	Notes
Head of a man with close cropped hair and a bushy mustache wearing a sailor suit with a wide flat collar and a scarf tied around the neck. A shield-shaped frame is drawn around the man's portrait.	Benjamin F. Baker	Navy	Coxswain	aboard USS Nashville, Battle of Cienfuegos, Cuba	May 11, 1898	For setting an example of extraordinary bravery and coolness under fire.
Head and shoulders of a man with neatly combed hair and a handlebar mustache wearing a plain military jacket with the letters "U.S.V." on the upright collar.	Edward L. Baker, Jr.	Army	Sergeant Major	Santiago, Cuba	Jul 1, 1898	Left cover and, under fire, rescued a wounded comrade from drowning.
—	David D. Barrow	Navy	Seaman	aboard USS Nashville, Battle of Cienfuegos, Cuba	May 11, 1898	For setting an example of extraordinary bravery and coolness under fire.
Head and torso of a young black man wearing a suit and tie with a watch chain hanging from a jacket button. He has a cap pushed high up on his forehead and tilted over his left ear.	Dennis Bell	Army	Private	Battle of Tayacoba, Cuba	Jun 30, 1898	Voluntarily went ashore in the face of the enemy and aided in the rescue of his wounded comrades; this after several previous attempts at rescue had been frustrated.
—	James H. Bennett	Navy	Chief Boatswain's Mate	aboard USS Marblehead, Battle of Cienfuegos, Cuba	May 11, 1898	For setting an example of extraordinary bravery and coolness under fire.
—	George Berg	Army	Private	Battle of El Caney, Cuba	Jul 1, 1898	For assisting in the rescue of the wounded while under heavy fire.
—	Albert Beyer	Navy	Coxswain	aboard USS Nashville, Battle of Cienfuegos, Cuba	May 11, 1898	For setting an example of extraordinary bravery and coolness under fire.
—	Robert Blume	Navy	Seaman	aboard USS Nashville, Battle of Cienfuegos, Cuba	May 11, 1898	For setting an example of extraordinary bravery and coolness under fire.
—	George F. Brady	Navy	Chief Gunner's Mate	aboard USS Winslow, Battle of Cárdenas, Cuba	May 11, 1898	On board the torpedo boat Winslow during the actions at Cardenas, Cuba, 11 May 1898.
—	George W. Bright	Navy	Coal Passer	aboard USS Nashville, Battle of Cienfuegos, Cuba	May 11, 1898	For setting an example of extraordinary bravery and coolness under fire.
—	Oscar Brookin	Army	Private	Battle of El Caney, Cuba	Jul 1, 1898	For assisting in the rescue of the wounded while under heavy fire.
—	Ulysses G. Buzzard	Army	Corporal	Battle of El Caney, Cuba	Jul 1, 1898	For assisting in the rescue of the wounded while under heavy fire.
—	Daniel Campbell	Marine Corps	Private	aboard USS Marblehead, Battle of Cienfuegos, Cuba	May 11, 1898	On board USS Marblehead during the cutting of the cable leading from Cienfuegos, Cuba, 11 May 1898.
Head of a man with mustache.	Charles P. Cantrell	Army	Private	Santiago, Cuba	Jul 1, 1898	For assisting in the rescue of the wounded while under heavy fire.
—	Joseph E. Carter	Navy	Blacksmith	aboard USS Marblehead, Battle of Cienfuegos, Cuba	May 11, 1898	For setting an example of extraordinary bravery and coolness under fire.
—	Thomas Cavanaugh	Navy	Fireman First Class	aboard USS Potomac from Cat Island to Nassau	Nov 14, 1898	On board USS Potomac during the passage of that vessel from Cat Island to Nassau, 14 November 1898.
—	Leonard Chadwick	Navy	Apprentice First Class	aboard USS Marblehead, Battle of Cienfuegos, Cuba	May 11, 1898	On board USS Marblehead during the operation of cutting the cable leading from Cienfuegos, Cuba, 11 May 1898.
Head of a white man with neatly combed hair and a bushy mustache wearing a double-breasted military jacket with two columns of large buttons down the chest.	George Charrette	Navy	Gunner's Mate First Class	USS Merrimac, harbor of Santiago de Cuba	Jun 2, 1898	For displaying extraordinary heroism while under heavy fire from Spanish batteries.
—	James R. Church	Army	Assistant Surgeon	Las Guasimas, Cuba	Jun 24, 1898	In addition to performing gallantly the duties pertaining to his position, voluntarily and unaided carried several seriously wounded men from the firing line to a secure position in the rear, each instance being subjected to a very heavy fire and great exposure and danger.
Head of a white man with mustache wearing a sailor suit with a wide flat collar open at the front.	Claus K. R. Clausen	Navy	Coxswain	USS Merrimac, harbor of Santiago de Cuba	Jun 2, 1898	For displaying extraordinary heroism while under heavy fire from Spanish batteries.
—	Thomas C. Cooney	Navy	Chief Machinist	aboard USS Winslow, Battle of Cárdenas, Cuba	May 11, 1898	On board the U.S. Torpedo Boat Winslow during the action at Cardenas, Cuba, 11 May 1898.
—	William A. Crouse	Navy	Watertender	aboard USS Concord off Cavite, Manila Bay, the Philippines	May 21, 1898	On board USS Concord off Cavite, Manila Bay, P.I., 21 May 1898.
—	Andrew J. Cummins	Army	Sergeant	Santiago, Cuba	Jul 1, 1898	For assisting in the rescue of the wounded while under heavy fire.
—	John Davis	Navy	Gunner's Mate Third Class	aboard U.S.S.Marblehead, Battle of Cienfuegos, Cuba	May 11, 1898	On board USS Marblehead, during the operation of cutting the cable leading from Cienfuegos, Cuba, 11 May 1898.
—	John F. De Swan	Army	Private	Santiago, Cuba	Jul 1, 1898	For assisting in the rescue of the wounded while under heavy fire.
Head of a white man with handlebar mustache wearing a sailor suit and a flat cap.	Osborn Deignan	Navy	Coxswain	USS Merrimac, harbor of Santiago de Cuba	Jun 2, 1898	For displaying extraordinary heroism while under heavy fire from Spanish batteries.
—	Thomas M. Doherty	Army	Corporal	Santiago, Cuba	Jul 1, 1898	For assisting in the rescue of the wounded while under heavy fire.
—	John J. Doran	Navy	Boatswain's Mate Second Class	aboard USS Marblehead, Battle of Cienfuegos, Cuba	May 11, 1898	For setting an example of extraordinary bravery and coolness under fire.
Head of a white man with mustache wearing a sailor suit with a scarf tied around the neck and a flat cap. Around the portrait is a shield-shaped frame.	Austin J. Durney	Navy	Blacksmith	aboard USS Nashville, Battle of Cienfuegos, Cuba	May 11, 1898	For setting an example of extraordinary bravery and coolness under fire.
—	John Eglit	Navy	Seaman	aboard USS Nashville, Battle of Cienfuegos, Cuba	May 11, 1898	For setting an example of extraordinary bravery and coolness under fire.
—	John W. Ehle	Navy	Fireman First Class	aboard USS Concord off Cavite, Manila Bay, the Philippines	May 21, 1898	On board USS Concord off Cavite, Manila Bay, the Philippines, 21 May 1898.
—	Nick Erickson	Navy	Coxswain	aboard USS Marblehead, Battle of Cienfuegos, Cuba	May 11, 1898	On board USS Marblehead during the operation of cutting the cable leading from Cienfuegos, Cuba, 11 May 1898.
—	Oscar W. Field	Marine Corps	Private	aboard USS Nashville, Battle of Cienfuegos, Cuba	May 11, 1898	For setting an example of extraordinary bravery and coolness under fire.
—	John Fitzgerald	Marine Corps	Private	Cuzco, Cuba	Jun 14, 1898	For heroism and gallantry in action.
Head of a white man wearing military uniform with many metals adorning it.	Herbert L. Foss	Navy	Seaman	aboard USS Marblehead, Battle of Cienfuegos, Cuba	May 11, 1898	For setting an example of extraordinary bravery and coolness under fire.
—	Frank O. Fournia	Army	Private	Santiago, Cuba	Jul 1, 1898	For assisting in the rescue of the wounded while under heavy fire.
Joseph J. Franklin circa 1918	Joseph J. Franklin	Marine Corps	Private	aboard USS Nashville, Battle of Cienfuegos, Cuba	May 11, 1898	On board USS Nashville during the operation of cutting the cable leading from Cienfuegos, Cuba, 11 May 1898.
—	Philip Gaughan	Marine Corps	Sergeant	aboard USS Nashville, Battle of Cienfuegos, Cuba	May 11, 1898	For setting an example of extraordinary bravery and coolness under fire.
—	Michael Gibbons	Navy	Oiler	aboard USS Nashville near Cienfugos, Cuba	May 11, 1898	For setting an example of extraordinary bravery and coolness under fire.
—	Freeman Gill	Navy	Gunner's Mate First Class	aboard USS Marblehead, Battle of Cienfuegos, Cuba	May 11, 1898	For setting an example of extraordinary bravery and coolness under fire.
—	Thomas J. Graves	Army	Private	Battle of El Caney, Cuba	Jul 1, 1898	For assisting in the rescue of the wounded while under heavy fire.
—	Benjamin F. Hardaway	Army	First Lieutenant	Battle of El Caney, Cuba	Jul 1, 1898	For assisting in the rescue of the wounded while under heavy fire.
—	William Hart	Navy	Machinist First Class	aboard USS Marblehead, Battle of Cienfuegos, Cuba	May 11, 1898	For setting an example of extraordinary bravery and coolness under fire.
Head of a man with full beard wearing a dark military jacket over a white shirt.	John W. Heard	Army	First Lieutenant	Mouth of Manimani River, west of Bahia Honda, Cuba	Jul 23, 1898	After 2 men had been shot down by Spaniards while transmitting orders to the engine-room on the Wanderer, the ship having become disabled, this officer took the position held by them and personally transmitted the orders, remaining at his post until the ship was out of danger.
—	Henry Hendrickson	Navy	Seaman	aboard USS Marblehead, Battle of Cienfuegos, Cuba	May 11, 1898	For displaying extraordinary bravery and coolness under fire.
—	Frank Hill	Marine Corps	Private	aboard USS Nashville, Battle of Cienfuegos, Cuba	May 11, 1898	For displaying extraordinary bravery and coolness under fire.
—	Thomas Hoban	Navy	Coxswain	aboard USS Nashville, Battle of Cienfuegos, Cuba	May 11, 1898	For displaying extraordinary bravery and coolness under fire.
Head and shoulders of a white man with a wide mustache and carefully combed hair wearing a plain military jacket with a single bar on each side of the collar.	Richmond P. Hobson	Navy	Lieutenant	USS Merrimac, harbor of Santiago de Cuba	Jun 3, 1898	In connection with the sinking of USS Merrimac at the entrance to the fortified harbor of Santiago de Cuba, 3 June 1898.
—	James L. Hull	Navy	Fireman First Class	aboard USS Concord off Cavite, Manila Bay, the Philippines	May 21, 1898	On board USS Concord off Cavite, Manila Bay, the Philippines, 21 May 1898.
—	Franz A. Itrich	Navy	Chief Carpenter's Mate	aboard USS Petrel, Manila, the Philippines	May 1, 1898	Serving in the presence of the enemy, Itrich displayed heroism during the action.
—	Alexander Jardine	Navy	Fireman First Class	aboard USS Potomac from Cat Island to Nassau	Nov 14, 1898	On board USS Potomac during the passage of that vessel from Cat Island to Nassau, 14 November 1898.
—	John P. Johanson	Navy	Seaman	aboard USS Marblehead, Battle of Cienfuegos, Cuba	May 11, 1898	On board USS Marblehead during the operation of cutting the cable leading from Cienfuegos, Cuba, 11 May 1898.
—	Johan J. Johansson	Navy	Ordinary Seaman	aboard USS Nashville, Battle of Cienfuegos, Cuba	May 11, 1898	On board USS Nashville during the operation of cutting the cable leading from Cienfuegos, Cuba, 11 May 1898.
—	Hans Johnsen	Navy	Chief Machinist	aboard USS Winslow, Battle of Cárdenas, Cuba	May 11, 1898	On board the torpedo boat Winslow during the action at Cardenas, Cuba, 11 May 1898.
—	Peter Johnson	Navy	Fireman First Class	aboard USS Vixen	May 28, 1898	On board USS Vixen on the night of 28 May 1898.
—	Michael Kearney	Marine Corps	Private	aboard USS Nashville, Battle of Cienfuegos, Cuba	May 11, 1898	For setting an example of extraordinary bravery and coolness under fire.
—	Philip B. Keefer	Navy	Coppersmith	aboard USS Iowa off Santiago de Cuba	Jul 20, 1898	On board USS Iowa off Santiago de Cuba, 20 July 1898.
Head and torso of a white man wearing a military tunic and cap	William Keller	Army	Private	Santiago de Cuba	Jul 1, 1898	For assisting in the rescue of the wounded while under heavy fire.
Head of a white man with mustache wearing a suit and bow tie.	Francis Kelly	Navy	Watertender	USS Merrimac, harbor of Santiago de Cuba	Jun 2, 1898	For displaying extraordinary heroism while under heavy fire from Spanish batteries.
—	Thomas Kelly	Army	Private	Santiago de Cuba	Jul 1, 1898	For assisting in the rescue of the wounded while under heavy fire.
—	Franz Kramer	Navy	Seaman	aboard USS Marblehead, Battle of Cienfuegos, Cuba	May 11, 1898	For setting an example of extraordinary bravery and coolness under fire.
—	Ernest Krause	Navy	Coxswain	aboard USS Nashville, Battle of Cienfuegos, Cuba	May 11, 1898	For displaying extraordinary bravery and coolness under fire.
—	Hermann W. Kuchneister	Marine Corps	Private	aboard USS Marblehead, Battle of Cienfuegos, Cuba	May 11, 1898	For displaying extraordinary bravery and coolness under fire.
	Fitz Lee	Army	Private	Battle of Tayacoba, Cuba	Jun 30, 1898	Voluntarily went ashore in the face of the enemy and aided in the rescue of his wounded comrades; this after several previous attempts had been frustrated.
	William Levery	Navy	Apprentice First Class	aboard USS Marblehead, Battle of Cienfuegos, Cuba	May 11, 1898	For displaying extraordinary bravery and coolness under fire.
Head and torso of a young white man wearing a forage cap and a heavy double-breasted coat with two columns of buttons down the chest.	Harry L. MacNeal	Marine Corps	Private	aboard USS Brooklyn, Battle of Santiago de Cuba	Jul 3, 1898	For displaying gallantry while under fire.
—	George F. Mager	Navy	Apprentice First Class	aboard USS Marblehead, Battle of Cienfuegos, Cuba	May 11, 1898	For displaying extraordinary bravery and coolness under fire.
—	George Mahoney	Navy	Fireman First Class	aboard USS Vixen	May 28, 1898	On board USS Vixen on the night of 28 May 1898. Following the explosion of the lower front manhole gasket of boiler A of that vessel, Mahoney displayed great coolness and self-possession in entering the fireroom.
—	John Maxwell	Navy	Fireman Second Class	aboard USS Marblehead, Battle of Cienfuegos, Cuba	May 11, 1898	For displaying extraordinary bravery and coolness under fire.
—	James Meredith	Marine Corps	Private	aboard USS Marblehead, Battle of Cienfuegos, Cuba	May 11, 1898	For displaying extraordinary bravery and coolness under fire. Name changed to Patrick F. Ford, Jr.
White man with mustache, hands on his hips, wearing a full sailor suit with lanyard around the neck, and single medal on the left breast, and a flat cap. Around the portrait is an oval-shaped frame with four stars.	William Meyer	Navy	Carpenter's Mate Third Class	aboard USS Nashville, Battle of Cienfuegos, Cuba	May 11, 1898	For displaying extraordinary bravery and coolness through this action.
Head and shoulders of a young white man wearing a sailor suit with a star-shaped medal on the left breast and a flat cap with a ribbon tied on the side.	Harry H. Miller	Navy	Seaman	aboard USS Nashville, Battle of Cienfuegos, Cuba	May 11, 1898	On board USS Nashville, during the operation of cutting the cable leading from Cienfuegos, Cuba, 11 May 1898.
Head and shoulders of a young white man with thick hair wearing a flat cap and a sailor suit with three medals on the left breast.	Willard Miller	Navy	Seaman	aboard USS Nashville, Battle of Cienfuegos, Cuba	May 11, 1898	For displaying extraordinary bravery and coolness under fire.
Head and torso of a seated white man with mustache and gray hair wearing a military jacket and white gloves, holding a peaked cap in one hand with the hilt of an ornate sword resting against his leg.	Albert Leopold Mills	Army	Captain and Assistant Adjutant General	Near Santiago, Cuba	Jul 1, 1898	Distinguished gallantry in encouraging those near him by his bravery and coolness after being shot through the head and entirely without sight.
Head of a white man with handlebar mustache wearing a suit and bow tie and peaked cap.	Daniel Montague	Navy	Chief Master-at-Arms	USS Merrimac, harbor of Santiago de Cuba	Jun 2, 1898	For displaying extraordinary heroism while under heavy fire from Spanish batteries.
—	William H. Morin	Navy	Boatswain's Mate Second Class	aboard USS Marblehead at the approaches to Caimanera, Guantanamo Bay, Cuba	Jul 26, 1898 – Jul 27, 1898	On board USS Marblehead at the approaches to Caimanera, Guantanamo Bay, Cuba, 26 and 27 July 1898.
—	Frederick Muller	Navy	Mate	aboard USS Wompatuck, First Battle of Manzanillo, Cuba	Jun 30, 1898	For displaying heroism and gallantry under fire.
Head of a white man with neatly combed hair and handlebar mustache wearing a suit and tie.	John E. Murphy	Navy	Coxswain	USS Merrimac, harbor of Santiago de Cuba	Jun 2, 1898	For displaying extraordinary heroism while under heavy fire from Spanish batteries.
—	James J. Nash	Army	Private	Santiago, Cuba	Jul 1, 1898	For assisting in the rescue of the wounded while under heavy fire.
—	George H. Nee	Army	Private	Santiago, Cuba	Jul 1, 1898	For assisting in the rescue of the wounded while under heavy fire.
—	Lauritz Nelson	Navy	Sailmaker's Mate	aboard USS Nashville, Battle of Cienfuegos, Cuba	May 11, 1898	For displaying extraordinary bravery and coolness under fire.
—	William Oakley	Navy	Gunner's Mate Second Class	aboard USS Marblehead, Battle of Cienfuegos, Cuba	May 11, 1898	For displaying extraordinary bravery and coolness under fire.
—	Anton Olsen	Navy	Ordinary Seaman	aboard USS Marblehead, Battle of Cienfuegos, Cuba	May 11, 1898	For displaying extraordinary bravery and coolness under fire.
—	Pomeroy Parker	Marine Corps	Private	aboard USS Nashville, Battle of Cienfuegos, Cuba	May 11, 1898	For displaying extraordinary bravery and coolness under fire.
Head and torso of a young black man in sailor suit and flat cap with a lanyard around his neck. Around the portrait is a circular frame with five stars.	Robert Penn	Navy	Fireman First Class	aboard USS Iowa off Santiago de Cuba	Jul 20, 1898	On board USS Iowa off Santiago de Cuba, 20 July 1898.
—	Herman Pfisterer	Army	Musician	Santiago, Cuba	Jul 1, 1898	For assisting in the rescue of the wounded while under heavy fire.
Head of a white man with a very wide handlebar mustache and closely cropped hair wearing a sailor suit.	George F. Phillips	Navy	Machinist First Class	USS Merrimac, harbor of Santiago de Cuba	Jun 2, 1898	For displaying extraordinary heroism while under heavy fire from Spanish batteries.
—	Alfred Polond	Army	Private	Santiago, Cuba	Jul 1, 1898	For assisting in the rescue of the wounded while under heavy fire.
Head and shoulders of a stern-faced white man wearing a plain military jacket and campaign hat.	John H. Quick	Marine Corps	Sergeant	battle of Cuzco, Cuba	Jun 14, 1898	Quick signaled USS Dolphin on 3 different occasions while exposed to a heavy fire from the enemy.
—	Alexander M. Quinn	Army	Sergeant	Santiago, Cuba	Jul 1, 1898	For assisting in the rescue of the wounded while under heavy fire.
—	Norman W. Ressler	Army	Corporal	Battle of El Caney, Cuba	Jul 1, 1898	For assisting in the rescue of the wounded while under heavy fire.
—	John P. Rilley	Navy	Landsman	aboard USS Nashville, Battle of Cienfuegos, Cuba	May 11, 1898	For displaying extraordinary bravery and coolness under fire.
—	Charles DuVal Roberts	Army	Second Lieutenant	Battle of El Caney, Cuba	Jul 1, 1898	For assisting in the rescue of the wounded while under heavy fire.
Profile of a white man, arms crossed, with drooping mustache and pince-nez glasses wearing a Hardee hat and a military jacket with the letters "U.S.V" on the upright collar.	Theodore Roosevelt*	Army	Lieutenant Colonel	Battle of San Juan Hill, near Santiago de Cuba	Jul 1, 1898	For leading a daring charge up San Juan Hill. Was awarded by President Bill Clinton on January 16, 2001. The only President to earn the Medal of Honor.
—	Henry P. Russell	Navy	Landsman	aboard USS Marblehead, Battle of Cienfuegos, Cuba	May 11, 1898	For displaying extraordinary bravery and coolness under fire.
	Joseph F. Scott	Marine Corps	Private	aboard USS Nashville, Battle of Cienfuegos, Cuba	May 11, 1898	For displaying extraordinary bravery and coolness under fire.
—	Warren J. Shepherd	Army	Corporal	Battle of El Caney, Cuba	Jul 1, 1898	For assisting in the rescue of the wounded while under heavy fire.
—	William Spicer	Navy	Gunner's Mate First Class	aboard USS Marblehead at the approaches to Caimanera, Guantanamo Bay, Cuba	Jul 26, 1898 – Jul 27, 1898	On board USS Marblehead at the approaches to Caimanera, Guantanamo Bay, Cuba, 26 and 27 July 1898. Displaying heroism, Spicer took part in the perilous work of sweeping for and disabling 27 contact mines during this period.[2]
—	Edward Sullivan	Marine Corps	Private	aboard USS Marblehead, Battle of Cienfuegos, Cuba	May 11, 1898	For displaying extraordinary bravery and coolness under fire.
—	Axel Sundquist	Navy	Chief Carpenter's Mate	aboard USS Marblehead at the approaches to Caimanera, Guantanamo Bay, Cuba	Jul 26, 1898 – Jul 27, 1898	On board USS Marblehead at the approaches to Caimanera, Guantanamo Bay, Cuba, 26 and 27 July 1898.
—	Gustav A. Sundquist	Navy	Ordinary Seaman	aboard USS Nashville, Battle of Cienfuegos, Cuba	May 11, 1898	For displaying extraordinary bravery and coolness under fire.
—	William H. Thompkins	Army	Private	Battle of Tayacoba, Cuba	Jun 30, 1898	Voluntarily went ashore in the face of the enemy and aided in the rescue of his wounded comrades; this after several previous attempts at rescue had been frustrated.
Head and shoulders of a man with a bushy drooping mustache wearing a flat cap and sailor suit. Around the portrait is an oval frame and a depiction of a steamship underway.	Samuel Triplett	Navy	Ordinary Seaman	aboard USS Marblehead at the approaches to Caimanera, Guantanamo Bay, Cuba	Jul 26, 1898 – Jul 27, 1898	On board USS Marblehead at the approaches to Caimanera, Guantanamo Bay, Cuba, 26 and 27 July 1898. Displaying heroism, Triplett took part in the perilous work of sweeping for and disabling 27 contact mines during this period.
—	Albert Vadas	Navy	Seaman	aboard USS Marblehead, Battle of Cienfuegos, Cuba	May 11, 1898	For displaying extraordinary bravery and coolness under fire. Name changed to Albert Wadas.
—	Hudson Van Etten	Navy	Seaman	aboard USS Nashville, Battle of Cienfuegos, Cuba	May 11, 1898	For displaying extraordinary bravery and coolness under fire.
—	Robert Volz	Navy	Seaman	aboard USS Nashville, Battle of Cienfuegos, Cuba	May 11, 1898	For displaying extraordinary bravery and coolness under fire.
—	George H. Wanton	Army	Private	Battle of Tayacoba, Cuba	Jun 30, 1898	Voluntarily went ashore in the face of the enemy and aided in the rescue of his wounded comrades; this after several previous attempts at rescue had been frustrated.
Head and shoulders of a white man standing erect, wearing a peaked cap over his eyes and a double-breasted military jacket with thick braided cords on the shoulders, three medals on the left breast, and a star-shaped medal hanging from his neck.	Ira C. Welborn	Army	Second Lieutenant	Santiago, Cuba	Jul 2, 1898	Voluntarily left shelter and went, under fire, to the aid of a private of his company who was wounded.
—	Bruno Wende	Army	Private	Battle of El Caney, Cuba	Jul 1, 1898	For assisting in the rescue of the wounded while under heavy fire.
—	Walter S. West	Marine Corps	Private	aboard USS Marblehead, Battle of Cienfuegos, Cuba	May 11, 1898	For displaying extraordinary bravery and coolness under fire.
—	Julius A. R. Wilke	Navy	Boatswain's Mate First Class	aboard USS Marblehead, Battle of Cienfuegos, Cuba	May 11, 1898	For displaying extraordinary bravery and coolness under fire.
—	Frank Williams	Navy	Seaman	aboard USS Marblehead, Battle of Cienfuegos, Cuba	May 11, 1898	For displaying extraordinary bravery and coolness under fire.
