= Frank Hill (Medal of Honor) =

- Born: August 13, 1864; Hartford, Connecticut
- Military career
- Allegiance: United States of America
- Branch: United States Marine Corps; United States Army
- Service years: 1896 - 1901 (USMC); 1901 - 1903 (USA)
- Rank: Private
- Unit: USS Nashville
- Conflicts: Spanish–American War
- Awards: Medal of Honor

Frank Hill (born August 13, 1864) was a private serving in the United States Marine Corps during the Spanish–American War who received the Medal of Honor for bravery.

== Biography ==
Hill was born August 13, 1864, in Hartford, Connecticut. He joined the Marine Corps from Portsmouth, Virginia in September 1896, and was honorably discharged in October 1901. Hill later joined the Army, and was discharged for disability in 1903 at Benicia, California.

== Medal of Honor citation ==
Rank and organization: Private, U.S. Marine Corps. Born: 13 August 1864, Hartford, Conn. Accredited to: Connecticut. G.O. No.: 521, 7 July 1899.

Citation:

On board the U.S.S. Nashville during the operation of cutting the cable leading from Cienfuegos, Cuba, 11 May 1898. Facing the heavy fire of the enemy, Hill displayed extraordinary bravery and coolness throughout this action.

== See also ==
- List of Medal of Honor recipients for the Spanish–American War
