= Thomas Hoban =

- Born: September 11, 1872; New York City, New York
- Died: December 17, 1922
- Military career
- Allegiance: United States
- Branch: United States Navy
- Rank: Coxswain
- Unit: U.S.S. Nashville
- Conflicts: Spanish–American War
- Awards: Medal of Honor

Thomas Hoban (born September 11, 1872) was a coxswain serving in the United States Navy during the Spanish–American War who received the Medal of Honor for bravery.

== Biography ==
Hoban was born September 11, 1872, in New York City, New York and after entering the navy was sent to fight in the Spanish–American War aboard the U.S.S. Nashville as a coxswain.

On May 11, 1898, the Nashville was given the task of cutting the cable leading from Cienfuegos, Cuba. During the operation and facing heavy enemy fire, Hoban continued to perform his duties throughout this action.

Thomas Hoban died on December 17, 1922, and is buried in Calvary Cemetery in the Woodside neighborhood of Queens, New York.

== Medal of Honor citation ==
Rank and organization: Coxswain, U.S. Navy. Born: 11 September 1872, New York, N.Y.. Accredited to: New York. G.O. No.: 521, 7 July 1899.

Citation:

On board the U.S.S. Nashville during the operation of cutting the cable leading from Cienfuegos, Cuba, 11 May 1898. Facing the heavy fire of the enemy, Hoban displayed extraordinary bravery and coolness throughout this action.

== See also ==
- List of Medal of Honor recipients for the Spanish–American War
