= Robert Blume =

US Navy sailor and Medal of Honor recipient (1868–1937)

Robert E Blume
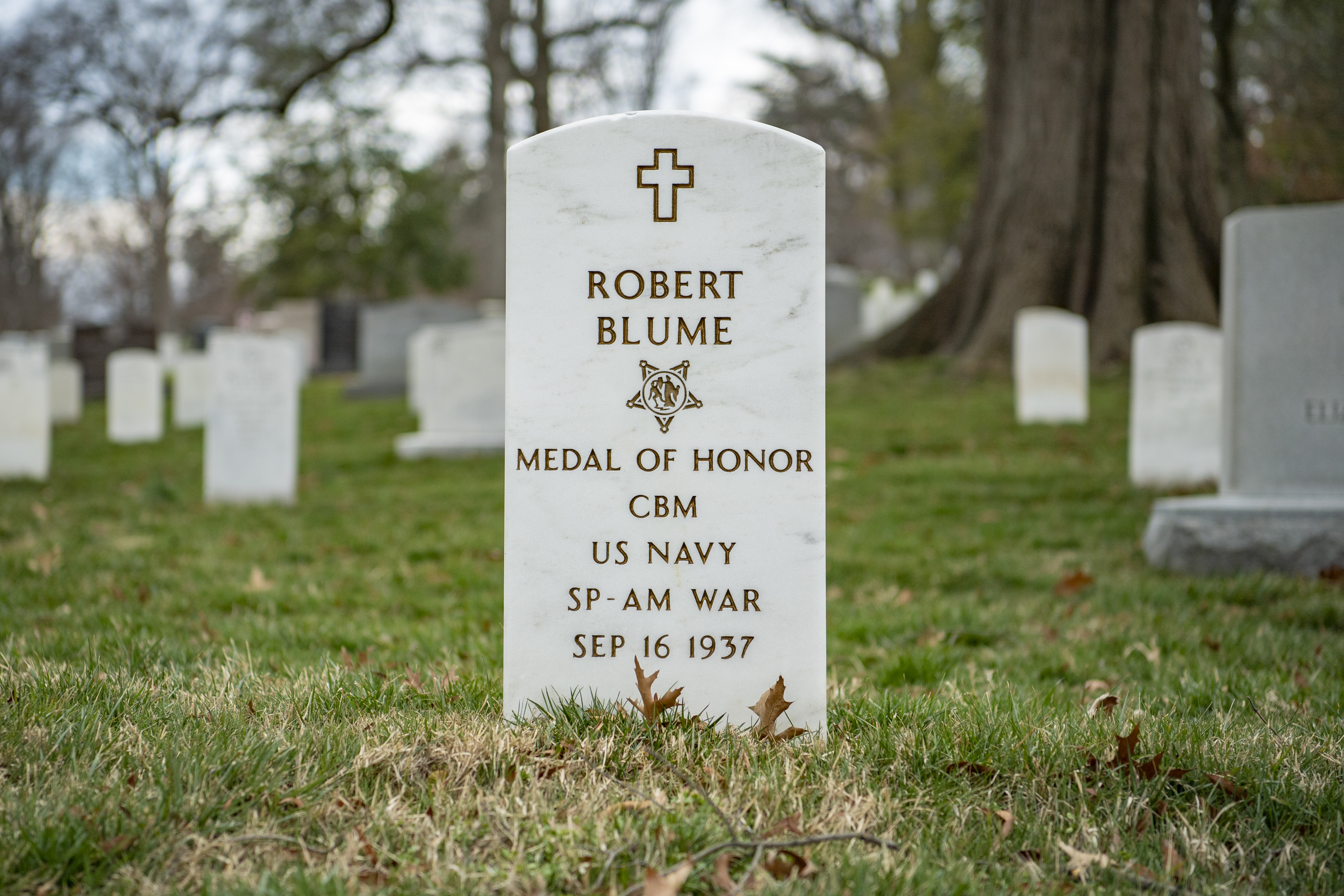
- Grave at Arlington National Cemetery
- Born: November 19, 1868; Pittsburgh, Pennsylvania, US
- Died: September 16, 1937 (aged 68); Washington, District of Columbia, US
- Burial place: Arlington National Cemetery
- Military career
- Allegiance: United States of America
- Branch: United States Navy
- Rank: Chief Petty Officer
- Unit: USS Nashville
- Conflicts: Spanish–American War; World War I
- Awards: Medal of Honor

Robert E Blume (November 19, 1868 – September 16, 1937) was an American sailor serving in the United States Navy during the Spanish–American War who received the Medal of Honor for his actions.

== Biography ==
Blume was born November 19, 1868, in Pittsburgh, Pennsylvania, and after entering the navy in 1897 he was sent as a seaman to fight in the Spanish–American War aboard the USS Nashville.

He died September 16, 1937, and was buried at Arlington National Cemetery, Arlington, Virginia.

== Stolen Medal of Honor ==
In 2003 an agent working for the Federal Bureau of Investigation was posing as a buyer when two people attempted to sell two Medals of Honor to him. One medal belonged to Blume and the other to United States Army First Sergeant George Washington Roosevelt who received his in actions during the American Civil War. Edward Fedora, a Canadian businessman, and his wife, Gisela, were charged with violating 18 U.S.C. § 704(b), Unlawful Sale of a Medal of Honor. Edward Fedora pleaded guilty and was sentenced to prison, but there is no record of what happened to Gisela.

== Medal of Honor citation ==
Rank and organization: Seaman, U.S. Navy. Born: 19 November 1868, Pittsburgh, Pa. Accredited to: New Jersey. G.O. No.: 521, 7 July 1899.

Citation:

On board the U.S.S. Nashville during the cutting of the cable leading from Cienfuegos, Cuba, 11 May 1898. Facing the heavy fire of the enemy, Blume set an example of extraordinary bravery and coolness throughout this action.

== See also ==
- List of Medal of Honor recipients for the Spanish–American War
