= Frederick Muller =

US Navy officer and Medal of Honor recipient (1861–1946)

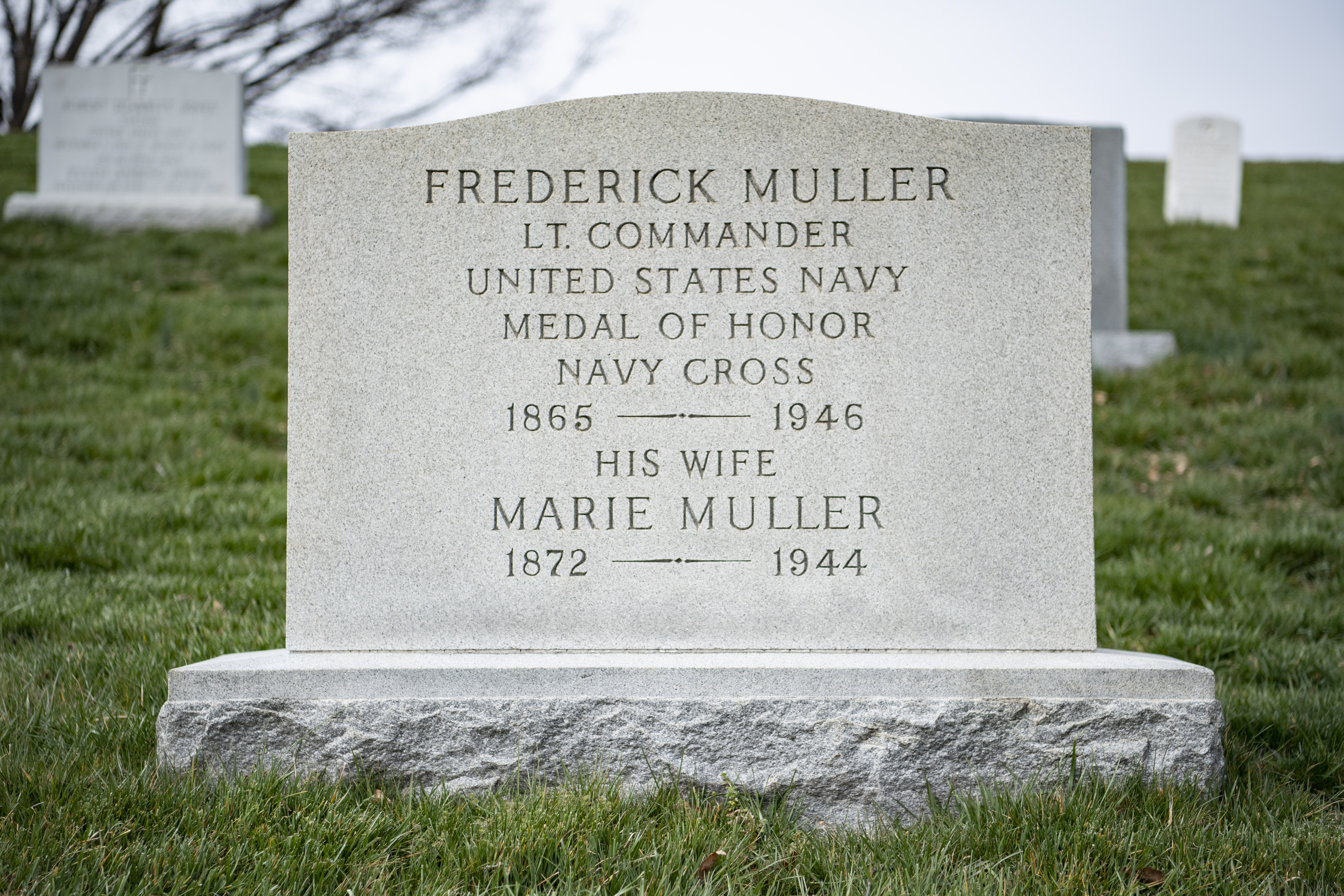
- Grave at Arlington National Cemetery
- Born: March 29, 1861; Copenhagen, Denmark
- Died: June 9, 1946 (aged 85)
- Burial place: Arlington National Cemetery Arlington, Virginia, United States
- Military career
- Allegiance: United States of America
- Branch: United States Navy
- Rank: Lieutenant Commander
- Unit: U.S.S. Wompatuck
- Conflicts: Spanish–American War
- Awards: Medal of Honor

Frederick Muller (March 29, 1861 – June 9, 1946) was a sailor serving in the United States Navy during the Spanish–American War who received the Medal of Honor for bravery.

== Biography ==
Muller was born March 29, 1861, in Copenhagen, Denmark. He emigrated to the United States and enlisted in the United States Navy. He served as a boatswain's mate during the Spanish–American War aboard the U.S.S. Wompatuck.

He received the Medal of Honor for displaying "heroism and gallantry" at the First Battle of Manzanillo in Cuba on June 30, 1898.

Muller was warranted to boatswain on May 26, 1899, and was promoted to chief boatswain on May 26, 1905. During World War I he was promoted to lieutenant on July 1, 1918. As of early 1919 he was in command of the minesweeper USS Hubbard (SP-416) operating in European waters.

He remained in the Navy after the war and eventually rose to the rank of lieutenant commander.

He died June 9, 1946, and is buried at Arlington National Cemetery with his wife Marie (1872–1944)

== Medal of Honor citation ==
Rank and organization: Mate, U.S. Navy. Born: 29 March 1861, Copenhagen, Denmark. Accredited to: Massachusetts. G.O. No.: 45, 30 April 1901.

Citation:

On board the U.S.S. Wompatuck, Manzanillo, Cuba, 30 June 1898. Serving under the fire of the enemy, Muller displayed heroism and gallantry during this period.

== See also ==
- List of Medal of Honor recipients for the Spanish–American War
