= John Davis (Medal of Honor, 1898) =

United States Navy officer and Medal of Honor recipient (1877–1970)

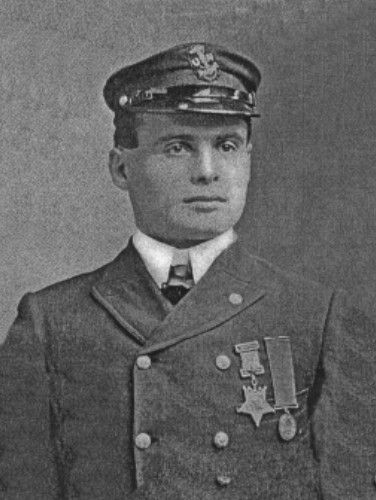
- John Davis
- Born: October 28, 1877; Germany
- Died: June 9, 1970 (aged 92); St. Petersburg, Florida, U.S.
- Burial place: Arlington National Cemetery, Arlington, Virginia
- Military career
- Allegiance: United States
- Branch: United States Navy
- Rank: Lieutenant commander
- Unit: USS Marblehead (C-11)
- Conflicts: Spanish–American War
- Awards: Medal of Honor

John Davis (October 28, 1877 – June 9, 1970) was a United States Navy officer who served during the Spanish–American War. He received the Medal of Honor for his actions during the war.

During the Spanish–American War, Davis served aboard USS Marblehead (C-11). He was awarded the Medal of Honor for his actions during the war and was later buried at Arlington National Cemetery.

== Biography ==
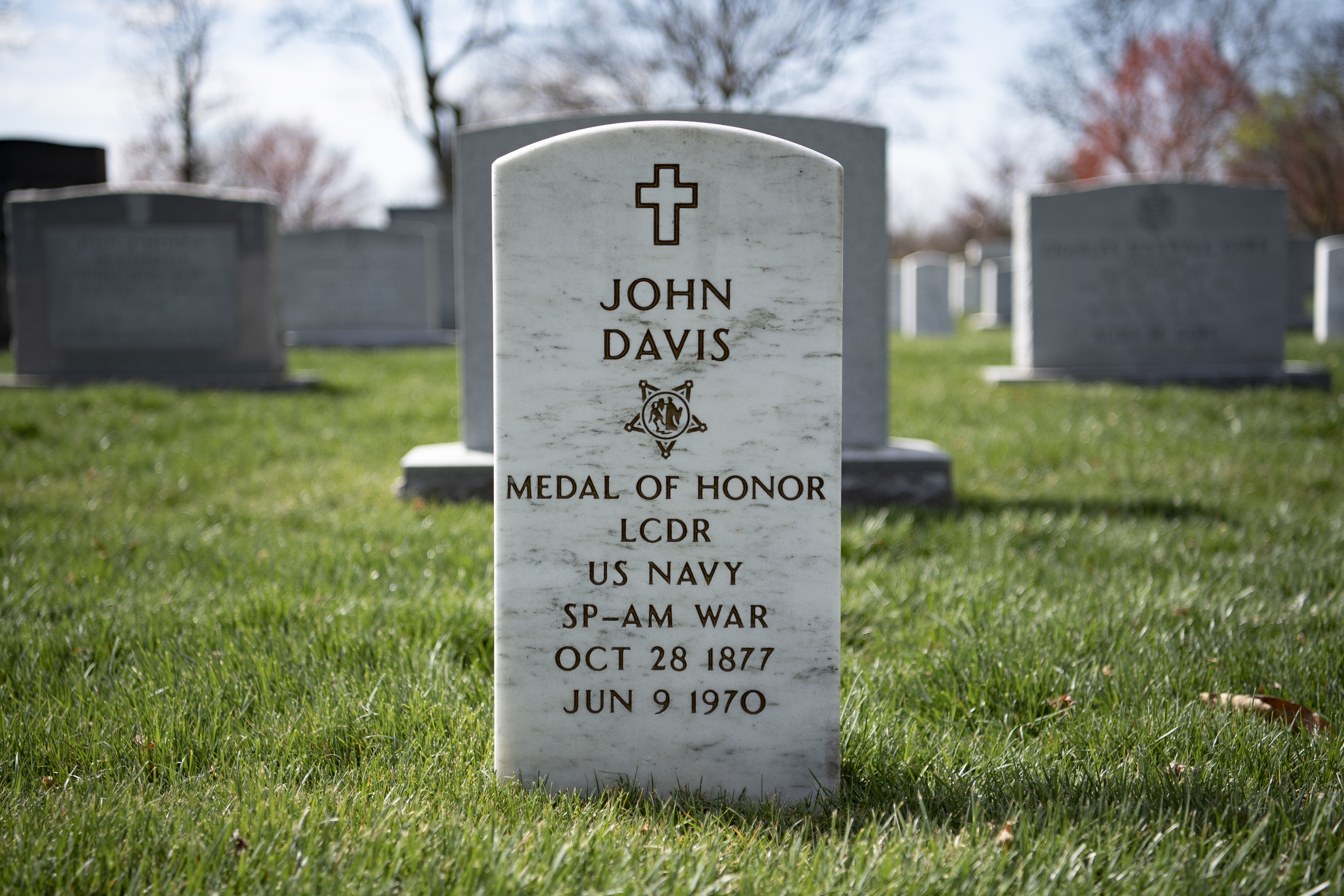
Grave at Arlington National Cemetery

Davis was born October 28, 1877, in Germany, and after entering the navy he was sent as a Gunner's Mate Third Class to fight in the Spanish–American War aboard the USS Marblehead (C-11).

Davis was warranted as a boatswain on May 16, 1904, and was promoted to the chief boatswain on May 16, 1910. During World War I received a temporary promotion to lieutenant on July 1, 1918.

He was the last living recipient of the Medal of Honor from the Spanish–American War when he died June 9, 1970, at the age of 92. He was buried at Arlington National Cemetery, Arlington, Virginia.

== Medal of Honor citation ==
Rank and organization: Gunner's Mate Third Class, U.S. Navy. Place and date: On board U.S.S. Marblehead at Cienfuegos, Cuba, 11 May 1898. Entered service at: New York, N.Y. Born: 28 October 1877, Germany. G.O. No.: 521, 7 July 1899.

Citation:

On board the U.S.S. Marblehead, during the operation of cutting the cable leading from Cienfuegos, Cuba, 11 May 1898. Facing the heavy fire of the enemy, Davis set an example of extraordinary bravery and coolness throughout this action.

== See also ==
- List of Medal of Honor recipients for the Spanish–American War
