= Philip B. Keefer =

Philip Bogan Keefer
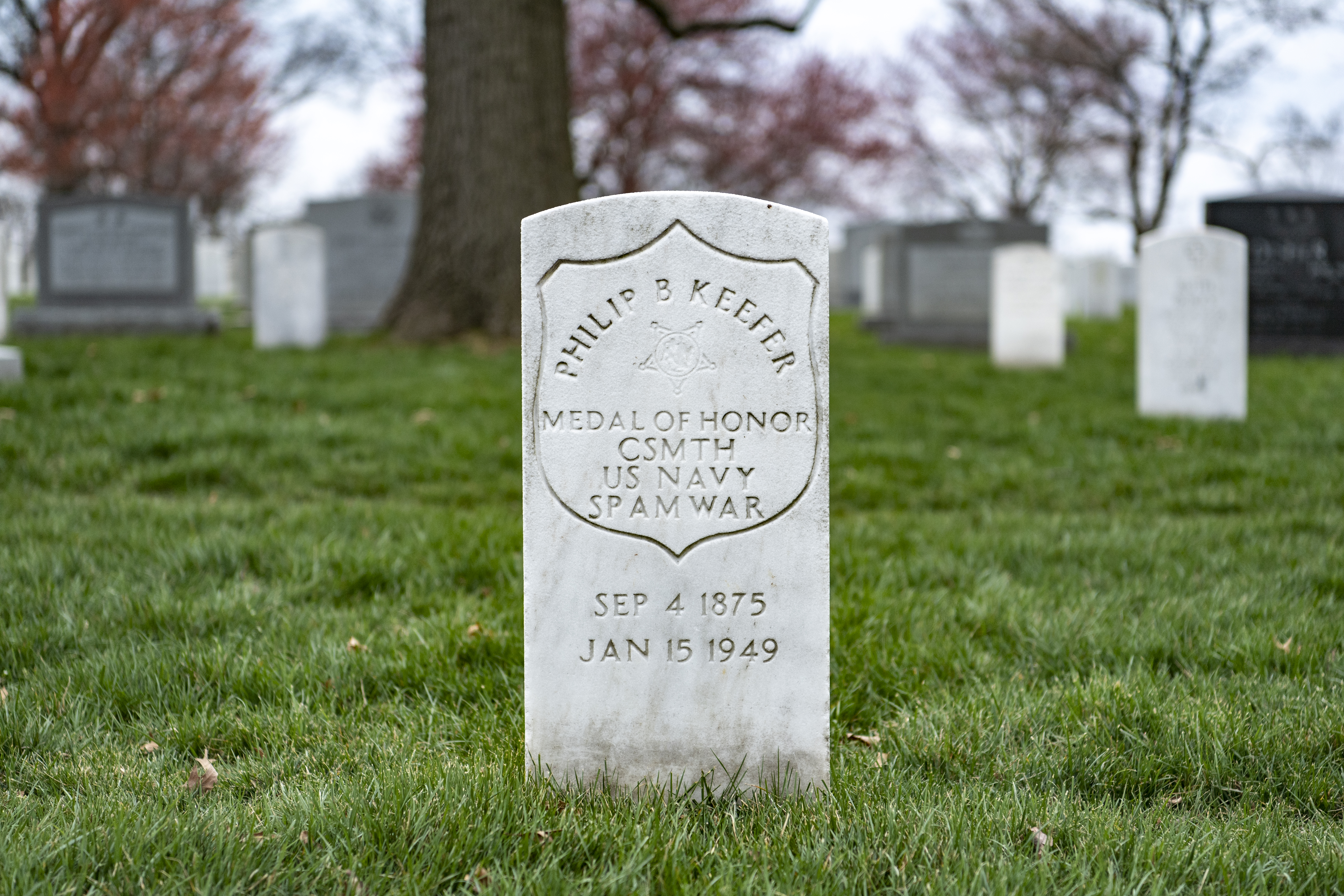
- Grave at Arlington National Cemetery
- Born: September 4, 1875; Washington, D.C., US
- Died: January 1, 1949 (aged 73); Washington, D.C., US
- Burial place: Arlington National Cemetery
- Military career
- Allegiance: United States
- Branch: United States Navy
- Rank: Coopersmith
- Unit: USS Iowa (BB-4)
- Conflicts: Spanish–American War
- Awards: Medal of Honor

Philip Bogan Keefer (September 4, 1875 – January 1, 1949) was a United States Navy sailor and a recipient of America's highest military decoration—the Medal of Honor—for his actions during the Spanish–American War.

On July 20, 1898, Keefer was serving as a coppersmith on the USS Iowa (BB-4) off the coast of Santiago de Cuba when a boiler accident occurred. For his actions during the incident, Keefer was issued the Medal of Honor five months later, on December 14, 1898.

== Medal of Honor citation ==
Coopersmith Keefer's official Medal of Honor citation reads:

On board the U.S.S. Iowa off Santiago de Cuba, 20 July 1898. Following the blow-out of a manhole gasket of that vessel which caused the fireroom to be filled with live steam and the floor plates to be covered with boiling water, Keefer showed courageous and zealous conduct in hauling fires from 2 furnaces of boiler B.

== See also ==
- List of Medal of Honor recipients
- List of Medal of Honor recipients for the Spanish–American War
