= George Mahoney =

US Navy Medal of Honor recipient

- Born: January 15, 1865; Worcester, Massachusetts
- Military career
- Allegiance: United States of America
- Branch: United States Navy
- Rank: Fireman First Class
- Unit: U.S.S. Vixen
- Conflicts: Spanish–American War
- Awards: Medal of Honor

George Mahoney (born January 15, 1865) was a fireman first class serving in the United States Navy during the Spanish–American War who received the Medal of Honor for bravery.

== Biography ==
Mahoney was born January 15, 1865, in Worcester, Massachusetts and after entering the navy was sent fireman first class.

== Medal of Honor citation ==
Rank and organization: Fireman First Class, U.S. Navy. Born: 15 January 1865, Worcester, Mass. Accredited to: Pennsylvania. G.O. No.: 167, 27 August 1904.

Citation:

On board the U.S.S. Vixen on the night of 28 May 1898. Following the explosion of the lower front manhole gasket of boiler A of that vessel, Mahoney displayed great coolness and self-possession in entering the fireroom.

== See also ==
- List of Medal of Honor recipients for the Spanish–American War
