= Michael Gibbons (Medal of Honor) =

Sailor in the Spanish–American War (1866–1933)

- Born: November 15, 1866; County Mayo, Ireland
- Died: February 27, 1933 (aged 66–67); Rosow, Ireland
- Burial place: Kilmeena, Republic of Ireland
- Military career
- Allegiance: United States of America
- Branch: United States Navy
- Rank: Oiler
- Unit: U.S.S. Nashville
- Conflicts: Spanish–American War
- Awards: Medal of Honor

Michael Gibbons (November 15, 1866 – February 27, 1933) was an oiler serving in the United States Navy during the Spanish–American War who received the Medal of Honor for bravery.

== Biography ==
Gibbons was born on November 15, 1866, in Ireland and after immigrating to the United States he entered the navy. He was sent to fight in the Spanish–American War aboard the U.S.S. Nashville as an oiler. After being discharged from the navy he lived for a while in Portsmouth, Virginia and after living in the US for 35 years he returned to Ireland.

He died at his home in Ireland in 1933, and until 1999 was buried in an unmarked grave in Old Kilmeena Cemetery.

== Medal of Honor citation ==
Rank and organization: Oiler, U.S. Navy. Born: Ireland. Accredited to: New York. G.O. No.: 521, 7 July 1899.

Citation:

On board the U.S.S. Nashville during the operation of cutting the cable leading from Cienfugos, Cuba, 11 May 1898. Facing the heavy fire of the enemy, Gibbons set an example of extraordinary bravery and coolness throughout this action.

== See also ==
- List of Medal of Honor recipients for the Spanish–American War
