= Johan J. Johansson =

US Navy sailor and Medal of Honor recipient (1870–1948)

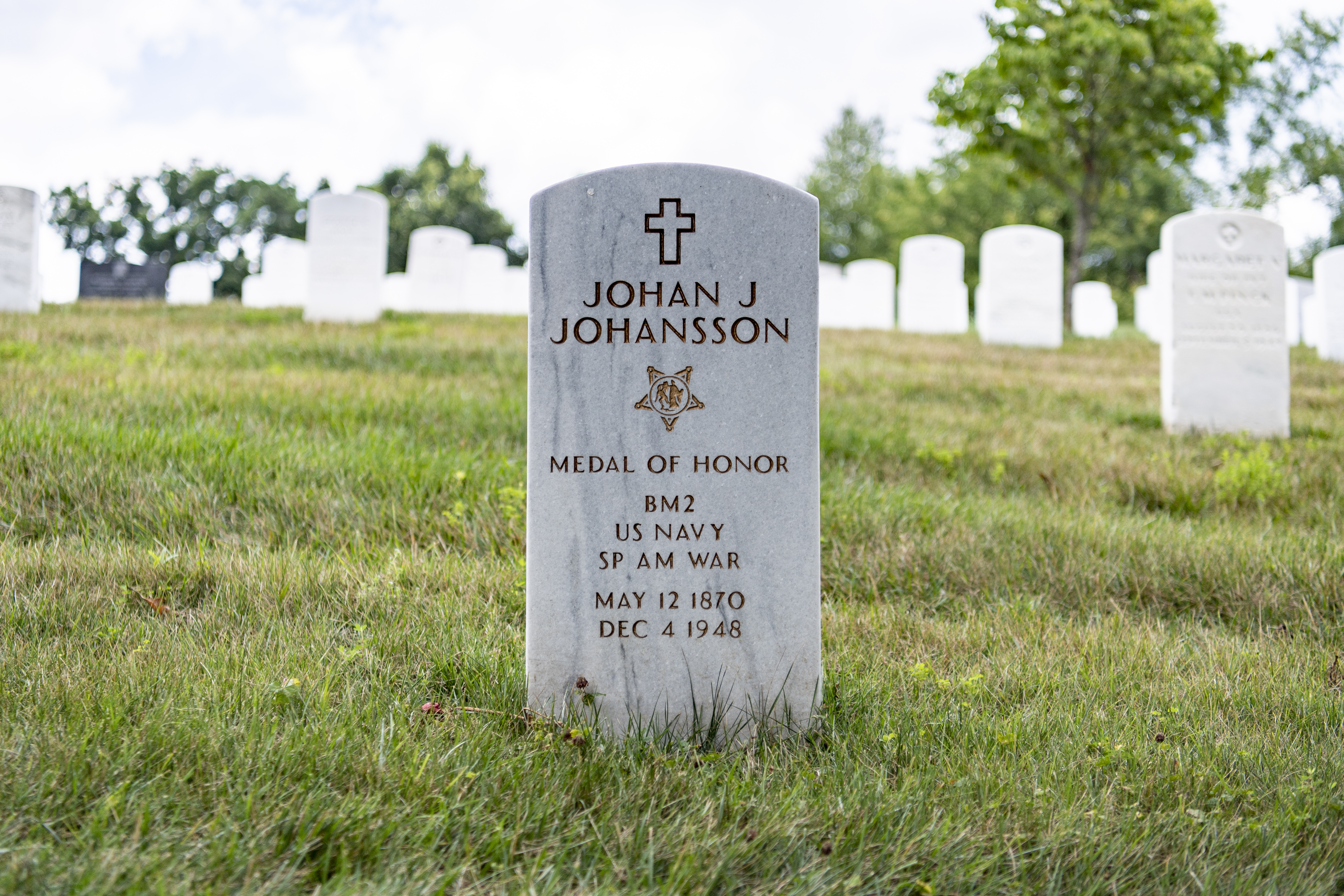
- Grave at Arlington National Cemetery
- Born: May 12, 1870; Sweden
- Died: December 4, 1948 (aged 78)
- Burial place: Arlington National Cemetery
- Military career
- Allegiance: United States
- Branch: United States Navy
- Rank: Boatswain's Mate Second Class
- Unit: U.S.S. Nashville
- Conflicts: Spanish–American War
- Awards: Medal of Honor

Johan J. Johansson (May 12, 1870 – December 4, 1948) was an ordinary seaman serving in the United States Navy during the Spanish–American War who received the Medal of Honor for bravery.

== Biography ==
Johansson was born May 12, 1870, in Sweden and after entering the United States Navy was sent to fight in the Spanish–American War aboard the gunboat U.S.S. Nashville as an ordinary seaman.

On May 11, 1898, the Nashville was given the task of cutting the cable leading from Cienfuegos, Cuba. During the operation and facing heavy enemy fire, he continued to perform his duties throughout this action.

He died December 4, 1948, and was buried at Arlington National Cemetery.

== Medal of Honor citation ==
Rank and organization: Ordinary Seaman, U.S. Navy. Born: 12 May 1870, Sweden. Accredited to: New York. G.O. No.: 521, 7 July 1899.

Citation:

On board the U.S.S. Nashville during the operation of cutting the cable leading from Cienfuegos, Cuba, 11 May 1898. Facing the heavy fire of the enemy, Johansson set an example of extraordinary bravery and coolness throughout this action.

== See also ==
- List of Medal of Honor recipients for the Spanish–American War
