= Herbert L. Foss =

Herbert Louis Foss
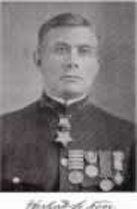
- Born: October 12, 1871; Belfast, Maine
- Died: September 1, 1937 (aged 65); Hingham, Massachusetts
- Burial place: Fort Hill Cemetery Hingham, Massachusetts
- Military career
- Allegiance: United States of America
- Branch: United States Navy
- Rank: Seaman
- Conflicts: Spanish–American War
- Awards: Medal of Honor

Herbert Louis Foss (October 12, 1871 – September 1, 1937) was a Seaman in the United States Navy who received the Medal of Honor for his actions during the Spanish–American War.

== Spanish–American War ==
Foss joined in the United States Navy in January, 1897. He served as a seaman on the light cruiser USS Marblehead. On May 11, 1898, during combat off the northwest coast of Cuba, the crew of the USS Marblehead pulled the main communications cable over the bow of their boat. Despite being under heavy fire, they severed the cable. Foss finished the job with a hacksaw. The crew suffered many casualties, however they accomplished their mission of disrupting communications between Cuba and Spain.

== Post war ==
After being discharged from the Navy, Foss moved to Hingham, Massachusetts and found work at the Naval Ammunition Depot in that town. He was a member of the United Spanish War Veterans. He became the superintendent of the Fort Hill Cemetery and, on September 1, 1937, while working at the cemetery, Foss died of heart disease. He was buried in the Fort Hill Cemetery Hingham, Massachusetts.

== Awards ==
- Medal of Honor
- Good Conduct Medal
- Sampson Medal
- Spanish Campaign Medal

=== Medal of Honor citation ===
Rank and Organization: Seaman, U.S. Navy. Born: 12 October 1871, Belfast, Maine. Accredited To: Maine. G.O. No.: 521, 7 July 1899.

Citation:

On board the U.S.S. Marblehead during the operation of cutting the cable leading from Cienfuegos, Cuba, 11 May 1898. Facing the heavy fire of the enemy, Foss set an example of extraordinary bravery and coolness throughout this action.

== See also ==
- List of Medal of Honor recipients for the Spanish–American War
