= Frank Williams (Medal of Honor) =

American sailor

- Born: October 19, 1872; Germany
- Died: 24 October 1900 (age 28); Puerto Rico
- Military career
- Allegiance: United States of America
- Branch: United States Navy
- Rank: Seaman
- Unit: U.S.S. Marblehead
- Conflicts: Spanish–American War
- Awards: Medal of Honor

Frank Williams (October 19, 1872 - October 24, 1900) was an American sailor serving in the United States Navy during the Spanish–American War who received the Medal of Honor for bravery.

== Biography ==
Williams was born October 19, 1872, in Germany, and, after entering the United States Navy, he served as a seaman to fight in the Spanish–American War.

Williams likely drowned on October 24, 1900, while living in Puerto Rico. His body was not recovered.

== Medal of Honor citation ==
Rank and organization: Seaman, U.S. Navy. Born: 19 October 1872, Germany. Accredited to: New York. G.O. No.: 521, 7 July 1899.

Citation:

On board the U.S.S. Marblehead during the operation of cutting the cable leading from Cienfuegos, Cuba, 11 May 1898. Facing the heavy fire of the enemy, Williams displayed extraordinary bravery and coolness throughout this period.

== See also ==
- List of Medal of Honor recipients for the Spanish–American War
