= John P. Johanson =

US Navy sailor and Medal of Honor recipient (1865–1937)

John Peter Johanson
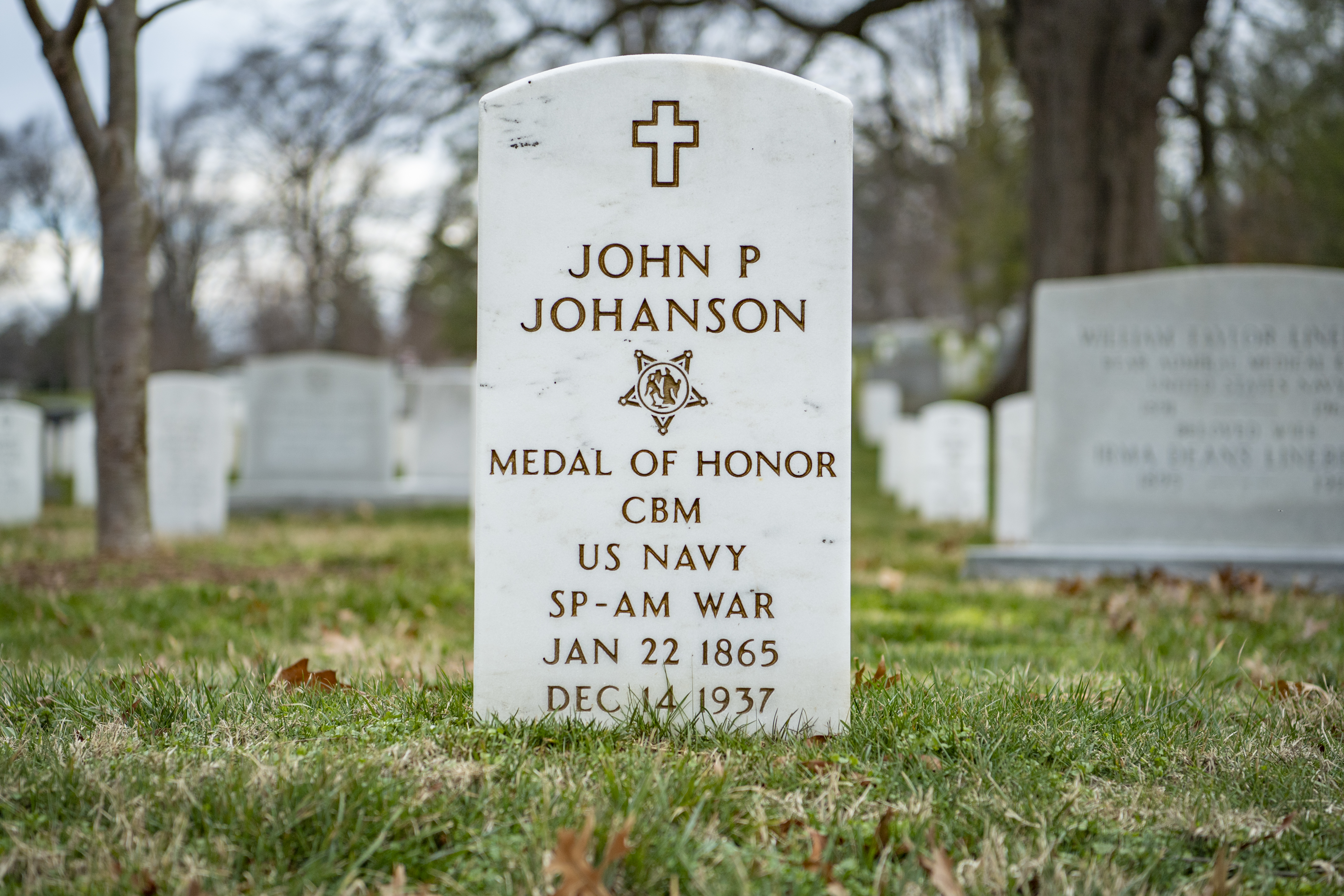
- Grave at Arlington National Cemetery
- Born: January 22, 1865; Oskarshamn, Sweden
- Died: December 14, 1937 (aged 72); Brooklyn, New York, US
- Burial place: Arlington National Cemetery
- Military career
- Allegiance: United States of America
- Branch: United States Navy
- Rank: Chief Boatswain's Mate
- Unit: U.S.S. Marblehead
- Conflicts: Spanish–American War; World War I
- Awards: Medal of Honor

John Peter Johanson (January 22, 1865 – December 14, 1937) was a sailor serving in the United States Navy during the Spanish–American War who received the Medal of Honor for bravery.

== Biography ==
Johanson was born January 22, 1865, in Sweden and after entering the navy was sent to fight in the Spanish–American War aboard the U.S.S. Marblehead as a seaman.

On May 11, 1898, the Marblehead was given the task of cutting the cable leading from Cienfuegos, Cuba. During the operation and facing heavy enemy fire, he continued to perform his duties throughout this action.

He died December 14, 1937, and was buried at Arlington National Cemetery, Arlington, Virginia.

== Medal of Honor citation ==
Rank and organization: Seaman, U.S. Navy. Born: 22 January 1865, Sweden. Accredited to: Maryland. G.O. No.: 529, 21 November 1899.

Citation:

On board the U.S.S. Marblehead during the operation of cutting the cable leading from Cienfuegos, Cuba, 11 May 1898. Facing the heavy fire of the enemy, Johanson set an example of extraordinary bravery and coolness throughout this action.

== See also ==
- List of Medal of Honor recipients for the Spanish–American War
