= Julius A. R. Wilke =

- Born: November 14, 1860; Germany
- Died: December 22, 1914 (aged 54)
- Burial place: Captain Ted Conaway Memorial Naval Cemetery Portsmouth, Virginia
- Military career
- Allegiance: United States of America
- Branch: United States Navy
- Rank: Boatswain's Mate First Class
- Unit: U.S.S. Marblehead
- Conflicts: Spanish–American War
- Awards: Medal of Honor

Julius August Robert Wilke (November 14, 1860 – December 22, 1914) was an American sailor serving in the United States Navy during the Spanish–American War who received the Medal of Honor for bravery.

== Biography ==
Wilke was born November 14, 1860, in Germany, and after entering the navy he was sent as a Boatswain's Mate First Class to fight in the Spanish–American War aboard the U.S.S. Marblehead. Wilke died on December 22, 1914, at the age of 54 years old.

== Medal of Honor citation ==
Rank and organization: Boatswain's Mate First Class, U.S. Navy. Born: November 14, 1860, Germany. Accredited to: New York. G.O. No.: 521, July 7, 1899.

Citation:

On board the U.S.S. Marblehead during the operation of cutting the cable leading from Cienfuegos, Cuba, 11 May 11, 1898. Facing the heavy fire of the enemy, Wilke displayed extraordinary bravery and coolness throughout this action.

== See also ==
- List of Medal of Honor recipients for the Spanish–American War
