= Harry L. MacNeal =

Harry Lewis MacNeal
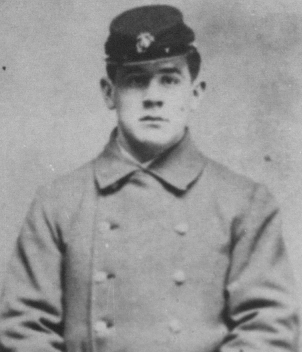
- Harry L. MacNeal while a US Marine
- Born: March 22, 1875; Philadelphia, Pennsylvania
- Died: March 13, 1950 (aged 74); Clifton, New Jersey
- Burial place: Clifton, New Jersey
- Military career
- Allegiance: United States of America
- Branch: United States Marine Corps
- Service years: 1896–1901, 1906
- Rank: Corporal
- Unit: USS Brooklyn (CA-3)
- Conflicts: Spanish–American War; *Battle of Santiago de Cuba
- Awards: Medal of Honor

Harry Lewis MacNeal (March 22, 1875 – March 13, 1950) was a United States Marine who was a recipient of America's highest military decoration, the Medal of Honor, for his actions during the Battle of Santiago de Cuba during the Spanish–American War. He was one of fifteen Marines, all enlisted men, to receive the Medal of Honor during the war, and the only Marine Corps recipient for this particular battle.

== Military service ==
A Philadelphia native, MacNeal enlisted in the United States Marine Corps from Philadelphia on November 16, 1896. During the Spanish–American War, as a private in the United States Marine Corps he was stationed on the armored cruiser USS Brooklyn, which served as the flagship of Commodore Winfield Scott Schley during the Battle of Santiago de Cuba on July 3, 1898. This was the largest naval engagement of the war.

During the five-hour battle, one of the Brooklyn's guns became jammed. Two other men attempted, but failed to clear it. MacNeal then volunteered to clear the shell with a hand rammer. He had to crawl along the gun's barrel and expose himself to "murderous fire from the enemy batteries", in addition to having to contend with the blasts from the forward turret, which nearly knocked him overboard. However he succeeded in his task and "resumed his duties as coolly as if what he had done were a matter of everyday routine". The American fleet sustained casualties of only one dead, Chief Yeoman George H. Ellis (1874–1898) of the Brooklyn, and two wounded; Lt. J.P.J. Ryan, Asst engineer and fireman J. Bevins, both also of the Brooklyn. There were less than 10 other men on the US ship who suffered only minor bruises or abrasions, due to the jolting gun fire of their own ships, wear as the entire Spanish Squadron of six ships was lost, sustaining 474 casualties.

MacNeal received the Medal of Honor on August 9, 1899, almost a year to the day after the war ended. From late 1899 till December 1901, he was stationed at Cavite the Philippines, returned to the United States in early December 1901, was sick in the hospital for two weeks, and discharged with an "excellent" record on 26 December 1901. A strange incident transpired five years later, where he re-enlisted on 4 January 1906 into the Marines at the New York navy yard, but was considered "deserted" with the transcription note mentioning that he failed to show up for assigned duty at Portsmouth Navy yard in February of the same year. He did register for the draft in World War I, and also registered for the Draft in World War II at the age of 63. As a civilian he had worked primarily as a department store manager in New Jersey since the early 20th century. He married after his discharge from the Marines, and raised a family in New Jersey. MacNeal died on March 13, 1950, and is buried in Clifton, New Jersey.

== Medal of Honor citation ==
Rank and organization: Private, U.S. Marine Corps. Born: March 22, 1879, Philadelphia, Pa. Accredited to: Pennsylvania. G.O. No.: 526, August 9, 1899.

Citation:

On board the U.S.S. Brooklyn during action at the Battle of Santiago de Cuba, 3 July 1898. Braving the fire of the enemy, MacNeal displayed gallantry throughout this action.

== See also ==
- List of Medal of Honor recipients
- List of Medal of Honor recipients for the Spanish–American War

== Notes ==
Harry L Macneal is listed as being born on 22 March 1879, in both his World War I and World War II draft registrations.
