= Thomas Cavanaugh =

United States Navy Medal of Honor recipient

- Born: May 10, 1869; Ireland
- Military career
- Allegiance: United States
- Branch: United States Navy
- Rank: Fireman First Class
- Unit: U.S.S. Potomac
- Conflicts: Spanish–American War
- Awards: Medal of Honor

Thomas Cavanaugh (born May 10, 1869) was an American sailor serving in the United States Navy during the Spanish–American War who received the Medal of Honor for bravery.

== Biography ==
Cavanaugh was born May 10, 1869, in Ireland, and after entering the navy he was sent as a Fireman First Class to fight in the Spanish–American War aboard the USS Potomac.

== Medal of Honor citation ==
Rank and organization: Fireman First Class, U.S. Navy. Born: 10 May 1869, Ireland. Accredited to: New York. G.O. No.: 503, 12 December 1898.

Citation:

On board the U.S.S. Potomac during the passage of that vessel from Cat Island to Nassau, 14 November 1898. Volunteering to enter the fireroom which was filled with steam, Cavanaugh, after repeated attempts, succeeded in reaching the auxiliary valve and opening it, thereby relieving the vessel from further danger.

== See also ==
- List of Medal of Honor recipients for the Spanish–American War
