= John Eglit =

US Navy sailor and Medal of Honor recipient

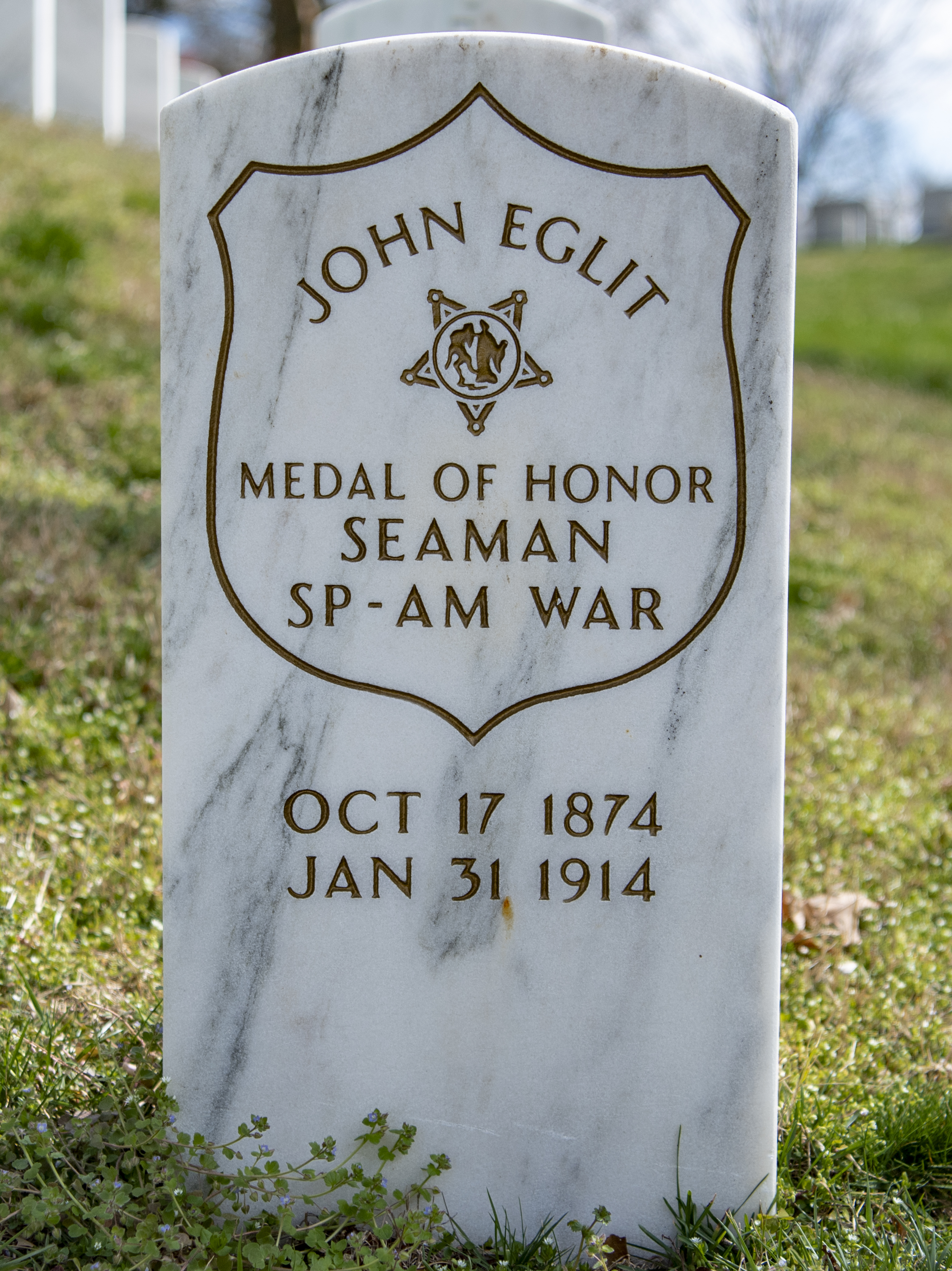
- Cenotaph at Arlington National Cemetery
- Born: October 17, 1874; Finland
- Died: January 31, 1914 (aged 39) lost at sea near Virginia
- Burial place: Arlington National Cemetery Arlington, Virginia, US
- Military career
- Allegiance: United States
- Branch: United States Navy
- Rank: Chief Master At Arms
- Unit: U.S.S. Nashville
- Conflicts: Spanish–American War
- Awards: Medal of Honor

John Eglit (October 17, 1874 – January 31, 1914) was a seaman serving in the United States Navy during the Spanish–American War who received the Medal of Honor for bravery.

He continued to serve in the navy until being lost at sea while aboard the steamer Monroe off the shores of Virginia in 1914. His cenotaph is located at Arlington National Cemetery.

== Biography ==
Eglit was born October 17, 1874, in Finland and after entering the navy he was sent to fight in the Spanish–American War aboard the U.S.S. Nashville.

He continued to serve in the navy after the war and went on achieve the rank of Chief Master At Arms. On January 31, 1914, he was a passenger aboard the Old dominion steamer Monroe when it sank off Virginia's eastern shore. He was declared lost at sea, but was given a cenotaph at Arlington National Cemetery, in Arlington, Virginia.

== Medal of Honor citation ==
Rank and organization: Seaman, U.S. Navy. Born: 17 October 1874, Finland. Accredited to: New York. G.O. No.: 521, 7 July 1899.

Citation:

On board the U.S.S. Nashville during the operation of cutting the cable leading from Cienfuegos, Cuba, 11 May 1898. Facing the heavy fire of the enemy, Eglit set an example of extraordinary bravery and coolness throughout this action.

== See also ==
- List of Medal of Honor recipients for the Spanish–American War
