= Herman Pfisterer =

United States Army Medal of Honor recipient (1866–1905)

- Born: April 1, 1866; Brooklyn, New York, US
- Died: August 6, 1905 (aged 39)
- Military career
- Allegiance: United States
- Branch: United States Army
- Service years: 1886–1905
- Rank: Musician
- Units: Company H, 21st U.S. Infantry
- Conflicts: Spanish–American War
- Awards: Medal of Honor

Herman Pfisterer (April 1, 1866 – August 6, 1905) was a musician serving in the United States Army during the Spanish–American War who received the Medal of Honor for bravery.

== Biography ==
Pfisterer was born on April 1, 1866, in Brooklyn, New York. He enlisted in the United States Army from New York City in January 1886. During the Spanish–American War, he served as a musician with Company H, 21st U.S. Infantry. He later received the Medal of Honor for assisting in the rescue of wounded soldiers while under enemy fire.

Pfisterer died on August 6, 1905.

In 1991 the Congressional Medal of Honor Society erected a monument in Washington State and presented it to the city of Vancouver, Washington that includes Herman Pfisterer's name as well as three other Medal of Honor recipients buried there.

== Medal of Honor citation ==
Rank and organization: Musician, Company H, 21st U.S. Infantry. Place and date: At Santiago, Cuba, 1 July 1898. Entered service at New York, N.Y. Birth: Brooklyn, N.Y. Date of issue: 22 June 1899

Citation:

Gallantly assisted in the rescue of the wounded from in front of the lines and under heavy fire from the enemy.

== See also ==
- List of Medal of Honor recipients for the Spanish–American War
