= George H. Nee =

U.S. Medal of Honor recipient

George Henry Nee
- Born: March 12, 1876; Boston, Massachusetts, US
- Died: March 4, 1952 (age 75)
- Burial place: Forest Hills Cemetery and Crematory Jamaica Plain, Massachusetts
- Military career
- Allegiance: United States
- Branch: United States Army
- Service years: 1897 - 1900, 1905 - 1908
- Rank: Sergeant
- Units: Company H, 21st U.S. Infantry
- Conflicts: Spanish–American War
- Awards: Medal of Honor

George Henry Nee (March 12, 1876 – March 4, 1952) was a private serving in the United States Army during the Spanish–American War who received the Medal of Honor for bravery.

== Biography ==
Nee was born March 12, 1876, in Boston, Massachusetts, and joined the army from his birth city in September 1897. He was sent to the Spanish–American War with Company H, 21st U.S. Infantry as a private where he received the Medal of Honor for assisting in the rescue of wounded while under heavy enemy fire. He was discharged in 1900, but served again from 1905 until 1908.

After leaving the Army, he was employed as the attendance officer at the Ulysses S. Grant School on Paris Street in East Boston, Massachusetts. He had other employment as a police officer and real estate agent.

In December 1927, Nee was awarded the Silver Star Citation (later converted to the Silver Star Medal) for acts of heroism in Luzon, Philippines in July 1899.

George Nee died on March 4, 1952, and is buried in Forest Hills Cemetery and Crematory, Jamaica Plain, Massachusetts. He was survived by his wife Mary, two sons, George H. Nee Jr. and Joseph F. Nee and a daughter, Mrs. John J. Murphy.

== Military awards ==
- Medal of Honor
- Silver Star
- Spanish Campaign Medal
- Philippine Campaign Medal

=== Medal of Honor citation ===
Rank and organization: Private, Company H, 21st U.S. Infantry. Place and date: At Santiago, Cuba, 1 July 1898. Entered service at: Boston, Mass. Birth: Boston, Mass. Date of issue: 22 June 1899.

Citation:

Gallantly assisted in the rescue of the wounded from in front of the lines and under heavy fire from the enemy.

== See also ==
- List of Medal of Honor recipients for the Spanish–American War
