= William Levery =

- Born: June 3, 1879; Pennsylvania
- Died: Unknown
- Burial place: Unknown
- Military career
- Allegiance: United States of America
- Branch: United States Navy
- Service years: 1896 - unknown
- Rank: Apprentice First Class
- Unit: USS Marblehead (C-11)
- Conflicts: Spanish–American War
- Awards: Medal of Honor

William Levery (June 3, 1879 - unknown) was an Apprentice First Class serving in the United States Navy during the Spanish–American War who received the Medal of Honor for valor.

== Biography ==
Levery was born June 3, 1879, in Pennsylvania and after entering the US Navy was sent to fight in the Spanish–American War aboard the Montgomery-class cruiser U.S.S. Marblehead as an Apprentice First Class.

== Medal of Honor citation ==
Rank and organization: Apprentice First Class, U.S. Navy. Born. 3 June 1879, Pennsylvania. Accredited to: Pennsylvania. G.O. No.: 521, 7 July 1899.

Citation:

On board the U.S.S. Marblehead during the operation of cutting the cable leading from Cienfuegos, Cuba, 11 May 1898. Facing the heavy fire of the enemy, Levery displayed extraordinary bravery and coolness throughout this action.

== See also ==
- List of Medal of Honor recipients for the Spanish–American War
