= James Robb Church =

United States Army Assistant Surgeon

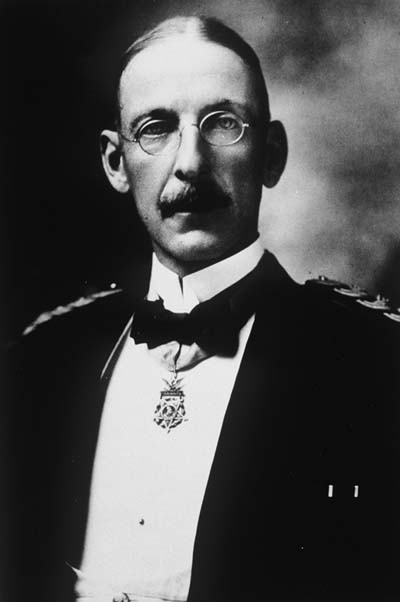
- Colonel James Robb Church
- Born: January 1, 1866; Chicago, Illinois, U.S.
- Died: May 18, 1923 (aged 57); Washington, D.C., U.S.
- Burial place: Arlington National Cemetery
- Military career
- Allegiance: United States of America
- Branch: United States Army
- Rank: Assistant Surgeon and later Colonel
- Unit: 1st United States Volunteer Cavalry Regiment
- Conflicts: Spanish–American War; World War I
- Awards: Medal of Honor
- Other work: Author, medical attache, doctor

James Robb Church (January 1, 1866 – May 18, 1923) was a United States Army Assistant Surgeon who received the Medal of Honor for his actions as part of the Rough Riders regiment during the Spanish–American War. He also served in World War I, and wrote about the effects of poison gas and his experiences as a wartime doctor.

== Education ==
Church graduated from the College of New Jersey (now Princeton University) with the class of 1888.

== Medal of Honor ==
Church was awarded a Medal of Honor for actions during the Battle of Las Guasimas in the Spanish–American War on June 24, 1898. He received his medal on January 10, 1906, from Theodore Roosevelt, who was also part of the Rough Rider regiment. It was the first time that the Medal of Honor had ever been presented in person by the president of the United States.

In addition to performing gallantly the duties pertaining to his position, voluntarily and unaided carried several seriously wounded men from the firing line to a secure position in the rear, in each instance being subjected to a very heavy fire and great exposure and danger.

== First World War ==
After the Spanish–American War, he remained in the Army, obtaining the rank of colonel. Before the United States entered World War I, Church went to France as an observer and an attaché with the French Army. Once the United States entered the war, Church joined the staff of the American expeditionary force.

While an observer in France, he reported on the newly introduced poison gas warfare. He himself suffered the effects of gas. The reports of Church and Charles Flandin became a basis for the Chemical Warfare Service. He wrote a book based on his experience as a wartime doctor, The doctor's part, what happens to the wounded in war.

James Robb Church died on May 18, 1923, and was buried in Arlington National Cemetery, Arlington, Virginia. His grave can be located in Section 3 Lot 1409-A.

== See also ==
- List of Medal of Honor recipients
- List of Medal of Honor recipients for the Spanish–American War
