= Joseph Francis Scott =

Joseph F. Scott
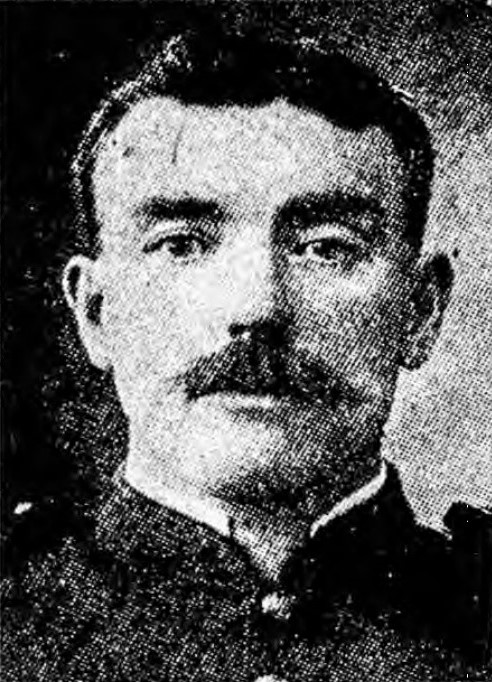
- Private Joseph F. Scott
- Born: June 4, 1864; Boston, Massachusetts, US
- Died: February 28, 1941 (aged 76); Massachusetts, US
- Burial place: Cambridge Cemetery, Cambridge, Massachusetts
- Military career
- Allegiance: United States of America
- Branch: United States Marine Corps
- Service years: 1888 - 1901
- Rank: Corporal
- Unit: USS Nashville
- Conflicts: Spanish–American War
- Awards: Medal of Honor

Joseph Francis Scott (June 4, 1864 – February 28, 1941) was a private serving in the United States Marine Corps during the Spanish–American War who received the Medal of Honor for bravery.

== Biography ==
Scott was born on June 4, 1864, in Boston, Massachusetts. He joined the Marine Corps from Boston in August 1888, and was honorably discharged in May 1901.

Scott died on February 28, 1941, and is buried at Cambridge Cemetery in Cambridge, Massachusetts.

== Medal of Honor citation ==

Rank and organization: Private, U.S. Marine Corps. Born: 4 June 1864, Boston, Mass. Accredited to: Massachusetts. G.O. No.: 521, 7 July 1899.

Citation:

On board the U.S.S. Nashville during the operation of cutting the cable leading from Cienfuegos, Cuba, 11 May 1898. Facing the heavy fire of the enemy, Scott displayed extraordinary bravery and coolness throughout this action.

== See also ==
- List of Medal of Honor recipients for the Spanish–American War
