= John Walter Ehle =

- Born: May 11, 1873; Kearney, Nebraska, U.S.
- Died: July 25, 1927 (aged 54); Presidio of San Francisco, California, U.S.
- Military career
- Allegiance: United States
- Branch: United States Navy
- Rank: Fireman First Class
- Unit: U.S.S. Concord
- Conflicts: Spanish–American War
- Awards: Medal of Honor

John Walter Ehle (May 11, 1873 – July 25, 1927) was a Fireman First Class serving in the United States Navy during the Spanish–American War who received the Medal of Honor for bravery.

== Biography ==
Ehle was born May 11, 1873, in Kearney, Nebraska and after entering the navy he was sent to fight in the Spanish–American War aboard the U.S.S. Concord as a Fireman First Class.

He died July 25, 1927.

== Medal of Honor citation ==
Rank and organization: Fireman First Class, U.S. Navy. Born: 11 May 1873, Kearney, Nebr. Accredited to: Nebraska. G.O. No.: 502 14 December 1898.

Citation:

On board the U.S.S. Concord off Cavite, Manila Bay, Philippine Islands, 21 May 1898. Following the blowing out of a lower manhole plate joint on boiler B of that vessel, Ehle assisted in hauling the fires in the hot, vapor_filled atmosphere which necessitated the playing of water into the fireroom from a hose.

== See also ==
- List of Medal of Honor recipients for the Spanish–American War
