= Nick Erickson =

Nicholas Erickson
- Born: July 18, 1870; Finland
- Died: June 21, 1931 (aged 60); New York City, New York, U.S.
- Burial place: Woodlawn Cemetery Bronx, New York, United States
- Military career
- Allegiance: United States
- Branch: United States Navy
- Rank: Coxswain
- Nickname: "Nick"
- Unit: U.S.S. Marblehead
- Conflicts: Spanish–American War
- Awards: Medal of Honor

Nicholas Erickson (July 18, 1870 – June 21, 1931) was a Coxswain serving in the United States Navy during the Spanish–American War who received the Medal of Honor for bravery.

== Biography ==
Erickson was born July 18, 1870, in Finland, and after entering the navy he was sent to fight in the Spanish–American War aboard the USS Marblehead (C-11) as a Coxswain.

He died June 21, 1931, and was buried in Woodlawn Cemetery Bronx, New York.

== Medal of Honor citation ==
Rank and organization: Coxswain, U.S. Navy. Born: 18 July 1870, Finland. Accredited to: New York. G.O. No.: 521, 7 July 1899.

Citation:

On board the U.S.S. Marblehead during the operation of cutting the cable leading from Cienfuegos, Cuba, 11 May 1898. Facing the heavy fire of the enemy, Erickson set an example of extraordinary bravery and coolness throughout this action.

== See also ==
- List of Medal of Honor recipients for the Spanish–American War
