= John F. De Swan =

John Francis De Swan
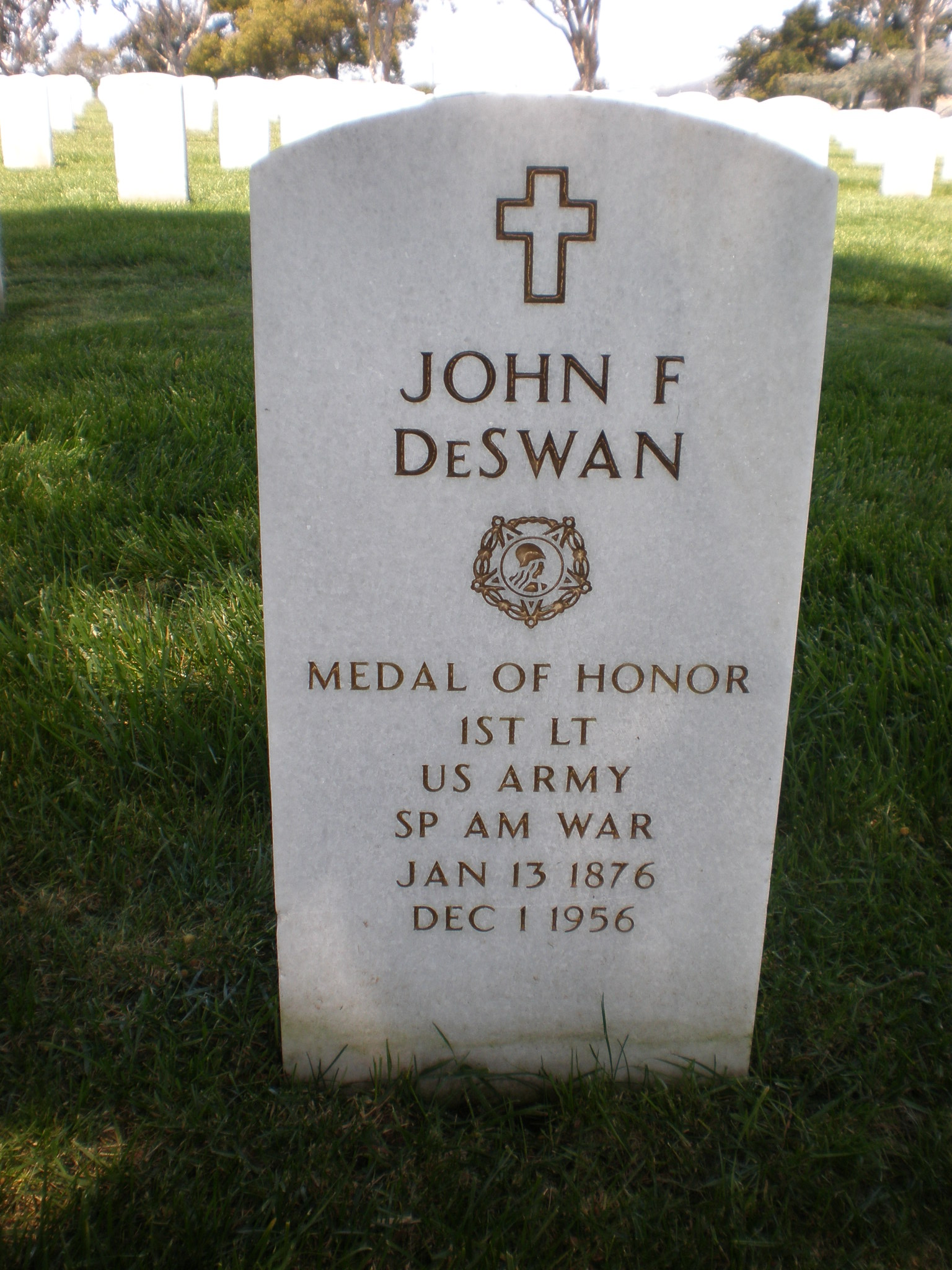
- DeSwan grave
- Born: January 13, 1876; Philadelphia, Pennsylvania, US
- Died: December 1, 1956 (aged 80)
- Military career
- Allegiance: United States
- Branch: United States Army
- Rank: First Lieutenant
- Units: Company H, 21st U.S. Infantry
- Conflicts: Spanish–American War
- Awards: Medal of Honor

John Francis DeSwan (January 13, 1876 – December 1, 1956) was a private serving in the United States Army during the Spanish–American War who received the Medal of Honor for bravery.

== Biography ==
De Swan was born January 13, 1876, in Philadelphia, Pennsylvania and joined the army from his birth city in May 1893 (claiming to be 21 because he was underage). He was discharged in December of that year, and re-enlisted in January 1896. He was sent to fight in the Spanish–American War with Company H, 21st Infantry Regiment as a private where he received the Medal of Honor for his actions.

He died December 1, 1956.

== Medal of Honor citation ==
Rank and organization: Private, Company H, 21st U.S. Infantry. Place and date: At Santiago, Cuba, 1 July 1898. Entered service at: Philadelphia, Pa. Birth: Philadelphia, Pa. Date of issue: 22 June 1899

Citation:

Gallantly assisted in the rescue of the wounded from in front of the lines and under heavy fire from the enemy.

== See also ==
- List of Medal of Honor recipients for the Spanish–American War
