= Voltz =

Voltz may refer to:

- Voltz (surname)
- Voltz (motorcycles), a Brazilian motorcycle manufacturer
- Toyota Voltz, Toyota automobile

== See also ==
- Voltz Lake, Wisconsin, unincorporated community in the United States
