= Alfred Polond =

United States Army Medal of Honor recipient

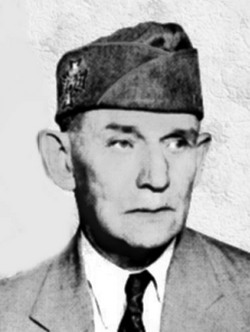
- Born: February 29, 1872; Lapeer, Michigan, US
- Died: February 29, 1956 (aged 84)
- Military career
- Allegiance: United States
- Branch: United States Army
- Rank: Private
- Units: Company F, 10th U.S. Infantry
- Conflicts: Spanish–American War
- Awards: Medal of Honor

Alfred Polond (February 29, 1872 – March 26, 1956) was a private serving in the United States Army during the Spanish–American War who received the Medal of Honor for bravery.

== Biography ==
Polond was born February 29, 1872, in Lapeer, Michigan, and entered the army from his place of birth. He was sent to fight in the Spanish–American War with Company F, 10th U.S. Infantry as a private where he received the Medal of Honor for his actions.

He died March 26, 1956.

== Medal of Honor citation ==
Rank and organization: Private, Company F, 10th U.S. Infantry. Place and date: At Santiago, Cuba, 1 July 1898. Entered service at: Lapeer, Mich. Birth: Lapeer, Mich. Date of issue: 22 June 1899. Citation:

Gallantly assisted in the rescue of the wounded from in front of the lines and while under heavy fire of the enemy.

== See also ==
- List of Medal of Honor recipients for the Spanish–American War
