= Pomeroy Parker =

- Born: March 17, 1874; Gates County, North Carolina, US
- Died: December 30, 1946 (aged 72)
- Military career
- Allegiance: United States
- Branch: United States Marine Corps
- Service years: 1892 - 1899
- Rank: Private
- Unit: USS Nashville
- Conflicts: Spanish–American War
- Awards: Medal of Honor

Pomeroy Parker (March 17, 1874 – December 30, 1946) was a private serving in the United States Marine Corps during the Spanish–American War who received the Medal of Honor for bravery.

== Biography ==
Parker was born on March 17, 1874, in Gates County, North Carolina. He joined the Marine Corps from Norfolk, Virginia in September 1892. In May 1899, shortly before his medal was awarded to him, he received a bad conduct discharge.

Parker died on December 30, 1946.

== Medal of Honor citation ==
Rank and organization: Private, U.S. Marine Corps. Born: 17 March 1874, Gates County, N.C. Accredited to: North Carolina. G.O. No.: 521, 7 July 1899.

Citation:

On board the U.S.S. Nashville during the operation of cutting the cable leading from Cienfuegos, Cuba, 11 May 1898. Facing the heavy fire of the enemy, Parker displayed extraordinary bravery and coolness throughout this action.

== See also ==
- List of Medal of Honor recipients for the Spanish–American War
