= Henry P. Russell =

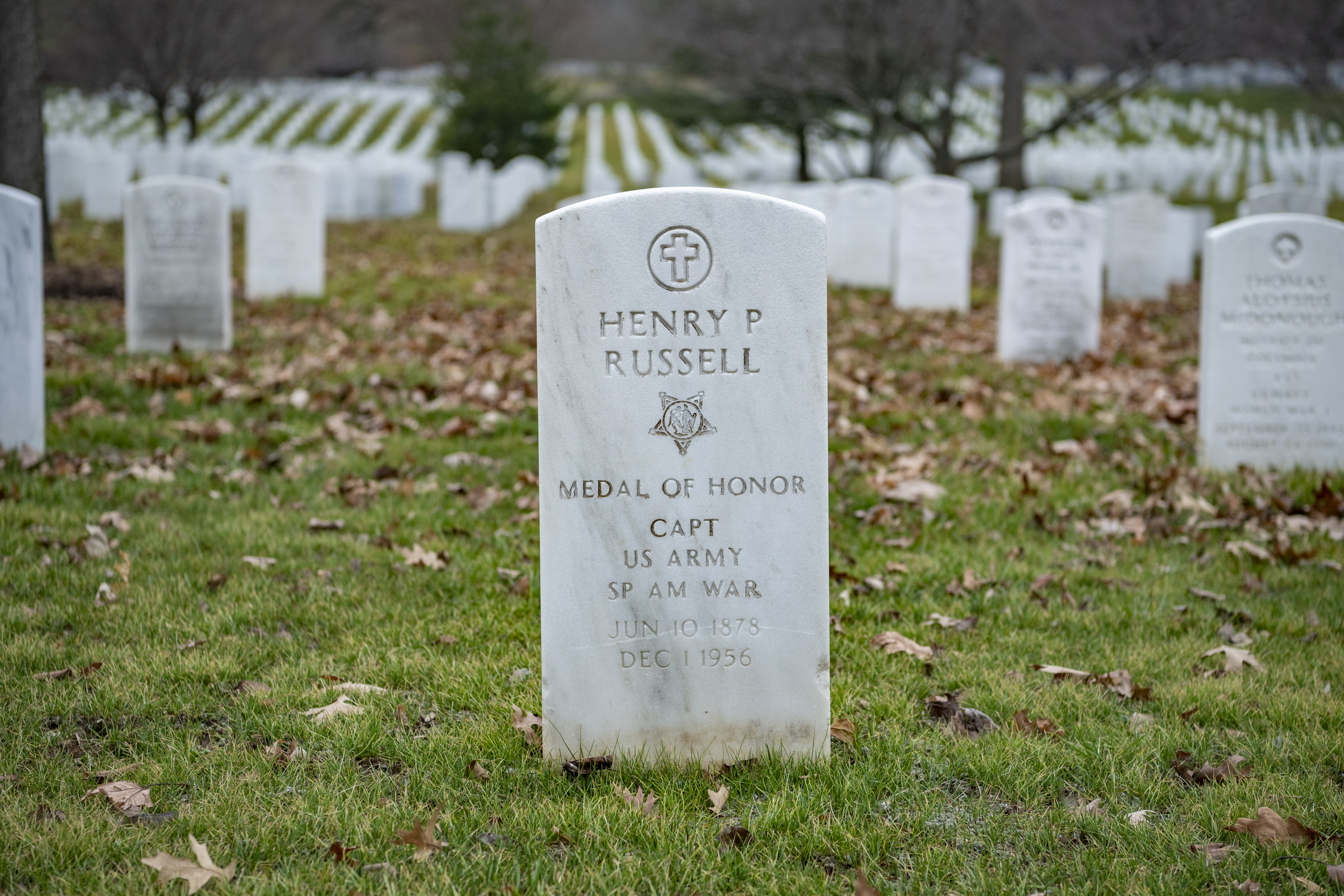
- Grave at Arlington National Cemetery
- Born: June 10, 1878; Quebec, Canada
- Died: December 1, 1956 (aged 78)
- Burial place: Arlington National Cemetery
- Military career
- Allegiance: United States
- Branch: United States Navy
- Rank: Landsman
- Unit: USS Marblehead (C-11)
- Conflicts: Spanish–American War
- Awards: Medal of Honor

Henry Peter Russell (June 10, 1878 – December 1, 1956) was a landsman serving in the United States Navy during the Spanish–American War who received the Medal of Honor for bravery.

== Biography ==
Russell was born June 10, 1878, in Quebec, Canada and after enlisting in the United States Navy on December 11, 1896, was sent to fight in the Spanish–American War aboard the U.S.S. Marblehead as a landsman.

He was awarded the Medal of Honor for participating in cutting a communications cable while serving on the cruiser USS Marblehead (C-11).

Russell was discharged from the Navy on December 10, 1899. On April 20, 1905, he joined the U.S. Army, served in the cavalry and artillery, and rose to the rank of master sergeant before retiring January 28, 1930. About 1910 he served with the 14th Cavalry Regiment in the Philippines.

Shortly after his discharge from the Regular Army, Russell was commissioned as a 1st lieutenant in the New Hampshire National Guard on May 10, 1930, and secured employment on the staff of the Adjutant General of New Hampshire. He was promoted to captain on October 11, 1931. In 1940 he was living in Portland, Maine.

Captain Henry P. Russell died at the Maine Veterans Hospital in Togus, Maine on December 1, 1956, and is buried at Arlington National Cemetery Arlington, Virginia. His grave can be found in the section 31, lot 6377.

== Awards ==
- Medal of Honor
- Sampson Medal
- Spanish Campaign Medal
- Philippine Campaign Medal
- Victory Medal

=== Medal of Honor citation ===
Rank and organization: Landsman, U.S. Navy. Born: 10 June 1878, Quebec, Canada. Accredited to: New York. G.O. No.: 521, 7 July 1899.

Citation:

On board the U.S.S. Marblehead during the operation of cutting the cable leading from Cienfuegos, Cuba, 11 May 1898. Facing the heavy fire of the enemy, Russell displayed extraordinary bravery and coolness throughout this action.

== See also ==
- List of Medal of Honor recipients for the Spanish–American War
