= Walter Scott West =

- Born: March 13, 1872; Bradford, New Hampshire, US
- Died: September 14, 1943 (aged 71)
- Military career
- Allegiance: United States of America
- Branch: United States Marine Corps
- Service years: 1897–1899
- Rank: Private
- Unit: USS Marblehead
- Conflicts: Spanish–American War
- Awards: Medal of Honor

Walter Scott West (March 13, 1872 – September 14, 1943) was a private serving in the United States Marine Corps during the Spanish–American War who received the Medal of Honor for bravery.

== Biography ==
West was born on March 13, 1872, in Bradford, New Hampshire. He joined the Marine Corps from Boston in May 1897. He initially received a bad conduct discharge in January 1899, which was upgraded to honorable in 1932.

West died on September 14, 1943.

== Medal of Honor citation ==
Rank and organization: Private, U.S. Marine Corps. Born: 13 March 1872, Bradford, N.H. Accredited to: New Hampshire. G.O. No.: 521, 7 July 1899.

Citation:

On board the U.S.S. Marblehead during the operation of cutting the cable leading from Cienfuegos, Cuba, 11 May 1898. Facing the heavy fire of the enemy, West displayed extraordinary bravery and coolness throughout this action.

== See also ==
- List of Medal of Honor recipients for the Spanish–American War
