= Robert Volz =

U.S. Navy sailor (1875–??)

- Born: January 31, 1875; San Francisco, California, U.S.
- Military career
- Allegiance: United States of America
- Branch: United States Navy
- Service years: 1897 - 1900
- Rank: Seaman
- Unit: U.S.S. Nashville
- Conflicts: Spanish–American War
- Awards: Medal of Honor

Robert Volz (born January 31, 1875) was a seaman serving in the United States Navy during the Spanish–American War who received the Medal of Honor for bravery.

== Biography ==
Volz was born January 31, 1875, in Hamberg near of Pforzheim, Germany, son of Emma Volz born Sickinger and Johannes Volz, and enlisted in the Navy from Norfolk, Virginia in August 1897 for a three-year term. After entering the navy he was sent to fight in the Spanish–American War aboard the U.S.S. Nashville as a seaman.

Volz's date of death and place of burial are unknown.

== Medal of Honor citation ==
Rank and organization: Seaman, U.S. Navy. Born. 31 January 1875, San Francisco, Calif. Accredited to: Virginia. G.O. No.: 521, 7 July 1899.

Citation:

On board the U.S.S. Nashville during the operation of cutting the cable leading from Cienfuegos, Cuba, 11 May 1898. Facing the heavy fire of the enemy, Volz displayed extraordinary bravery and coolness throughout this period.

== See also ==
- List of Medal of Honor recipients for the Spanish–American War
