= David D. Barrow =

American sailor

David Duffy Barrow
- Born: July 22, 1876; Reelsboro, North Carolina, U.S.
- Died: December 6, 1948 (aged 72); Richmond, Virginia, U.S.
- Burial place: Evergreen Memorial Park, Portsmouth, Virginia
- Military career
- Allegiance: United States of America
- Branch: United States Navy
- Rank: Seaman
- Conflicts: Spanish–American War
- Awards: Medal of Honor

David Duffy Barrow (July 22, 1876– December 6, 1948) was an American sailor serving in the United States Navy during the Spanish–American War who received the Medal of Honor for bravery.

== Biography ==
Barrow was born July, 1876 in Reelsboro, North Carolina, and after entering the navy he was sent as a seaman to fight in the Spanish–American War.

He died December 6, 1948, and was buried in Evergreen Memorial Park, Portsmouth, Virginia.

== Medal of Honor citation ==
Rank and organization: Seaman, U.S. Navy. Born: 22 October 1876, Reelsboro, N.C. Entered service at: Norfolk, Va. G.O. No.: 521, 7 July 1899.

Citation:

On board the U.S.S. Nashville during the cutting of the cable leading from Cienfuegos, Cuba, 11 May 1898. Facing the heavy fire of the enemy, Barrow set an example of extraordinary bravery and coolness throughout this action.

== See also ==
- List of Medal of Honor recipients for the Spanish–American War
