= George Washington Bright =

United States Navy Medal of Honor recipient

- Born: December 1, 1874; Norfolk, Virginia, U.S.
- Died: March 20, 1949 (aged 74); Richmond, Virginia, U.S.
- Burial place: Blandford Cemetery Petersburg, Virginia: Ward C, Old Ground, Section 13, Square 6
- Military career
- Allegiance: United States
- Branch: United States Navy
- Rank: Coal Passer
- Unit: USS Nashville (PG-7)
- Conflicts: Spanish–American War
- Awards: Medal of Honor

George Washington Bright (December 27, 1874 – March 20, 1949) was an American sailor serving in the United States Navy during the Spanish–American War who received the Medal of Honor for his actions.

== Biography ==
Bright was born December 27, 1874, in Norfolk, Virginia, and after entering the navy he was sent as a Coal Passer to fight in the Spanish–American War aboard the USS Nashville (PG-7).

He died March 20, 1949, and is buried in Blandford Cemetery Petersburg, Virginia.

== Medal of Honor citation ==
Rank and organization: Coal Passer, U.S. Navy. Born: 27 December 1874, Norfolk, Va. Accredited to: Virginia. G.O. No.: 521, 7 July 1899.

Citation:

On board the U.S.S. Nashville during the cutting of the cable leading from Cienfuegos, Cuba, 11 May 1898. Facing the heavy fire of the enemy, Bright set an example of extraordinary bravery and coolness throughout this action.

== See also ==
- List of Medal of Honor recipients for the Spanish–American War
