= Voltz (surname) =

Voltz is a surname. Notable people with the surname include:

- Philippe-Louis Voltz (1785–1840), French geologist and paleontologist
- Johann Michael Voltz (1784–1858), German painter, graphic artist, and cartoonist
- Ray Voltz, American soccer player
- Lynda Voltz (born 1965), Australian politician
- Alexander Voltz (born 1999), Australian composer

== See also ==
- Holtz
