= Alexander Jardine (Medal of Honor) =

US Navy sailor and Medal of Honor recipient (1874–1949)

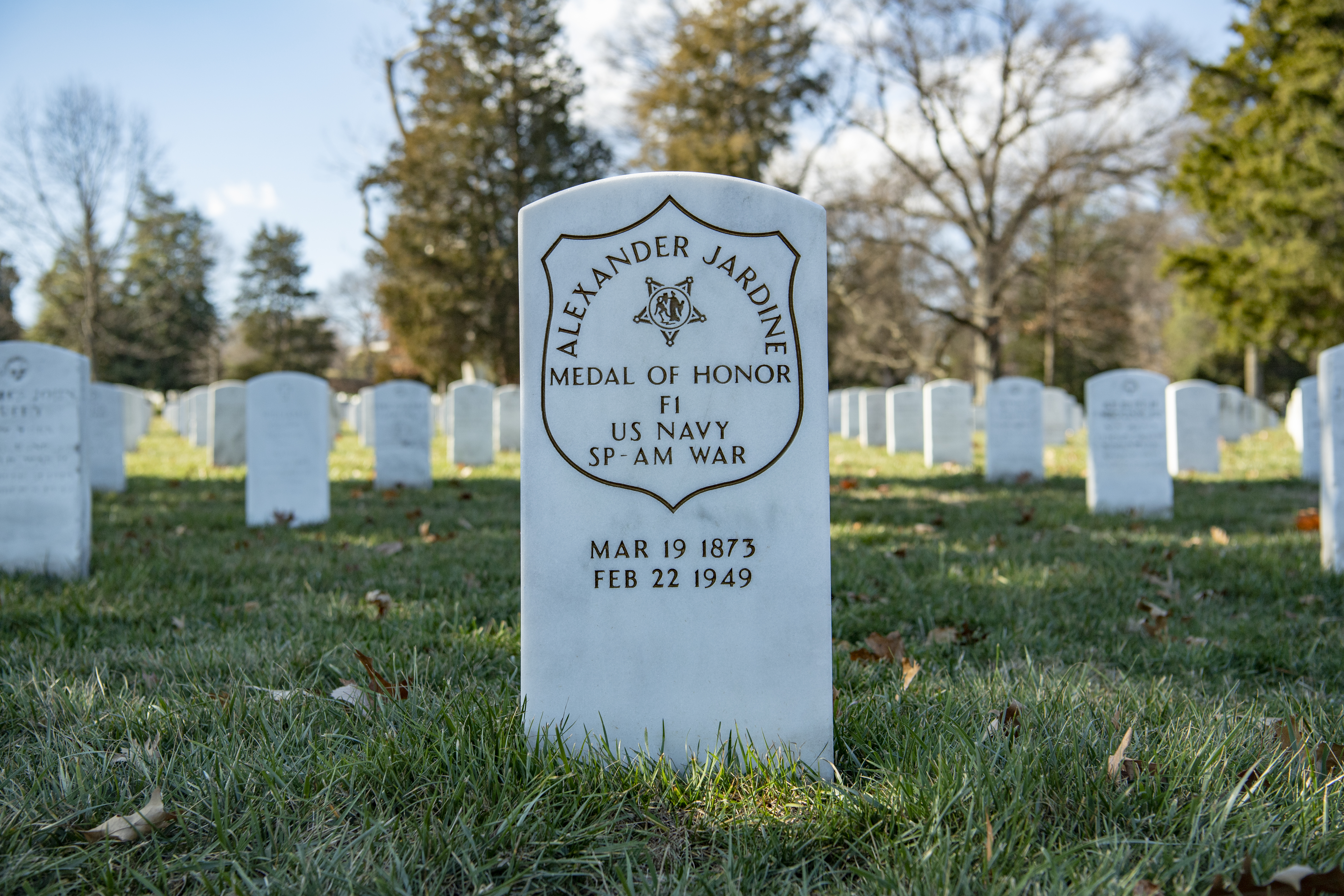
- Grave at Arlington National Cemetery
- Born: March 19, 1873; Inverness, Scotland
- Died: February 22, 1949 (aged 75)
- Burial place: Arlington National Cemetery Arlington, Virginia
- Military career
- Allegiance: United States
- Branch: United States Navy
- Rank: Fireman First Class
- Unit: U.S.S. Potomac
- Conflicts: Spanish–American War
- Awards: Medal of Honor

Alexander Jardine (October 17, 1874 – February 22, 1949) was a fireman first class serving in the United States Navy during the Spanish–American War who received the Medal of Honor for bravery.

== Biography ==
Jardine was born October 17, 1874, in Inverness, Scotland and after entering the navy he was sent to fight in the Spanish–American War aboard the U.S.S. Potomac as a Fireman First Class.

He died February 22, 1949, and was buried at Arlington National Cemetery Arlington, Virginia.

== Medal of Honor citation ==
Rank and organization: Fireman First Class, U.S. Navy. Born: 19 March 1873, Inverness, Scotland. Accredited to: Ohio. G.O. No.: 503, 13 December 1898.

Citation:

On board the U.S.S. Potomac during the passage of that vessel from Cat Island to Nassau, 14 November 1898. Volunteering to enter the fireroom which was filled with steam, Jardine, after repeated attempts, succeeded in reaching the auxiliary valve and opening it, thereby relieving the vessel from further danger.

== See also ==
- List of Medal of Honor recipients for the Spanish–American War
