= Albert Vadas =

Albert Radas
- Born: March 26, 1876; Austria-Hungary
- Died: October 3, 1946 (aged 70)
- Burial place: Weehawken Cemetery, North Bergen, New Jersey, U.S.
- Military career
- Allegiance: United States
- Branch: United States Navy
- Rank: Seaman
- Unit: USS Marblehead
- Conflicts: Spanish–American War
- Awards: Medal of Honor

Albert Radas (March 26, 1876 – October 3, 1946) was a United States Navy seaman of Croatian descent who served during the Spanish–American War. He received the Medal of Honor for his bravery.

== Biography ==
Vadas was born on March 26, 1876, in Fiume, Austria-Hungary. After entering the United States Navy, he served aboard the USS Marblehead as a seaman during the Spanish-American war.

Vadas died on October 3, 1946, and is interred at Weehawken Cemetery in North Bergen, New Jersey.

== Medal of Honor citation ==
Rank and organization: Seaman, U.S. Navy. (Named changed to Wadas, Albert.) Born: 26 March 1876, Austria-Hungary. Accredited to: New York. G.O. No.: 521, 7 July 1899.

Citation:

On board the U.S.S. Marblehead during the operation of cutting the cable leading from Cienfuegos, Cuba, 11 May 1898. Facing the heavy fire of the enemy, Vadas displayed extraordinary bravery and coolness throughout this period.

== See also ==
- List of Medal of Honor recipients for the Spanish–American War
