= Edwin Martin =

Edwin Martin may refer to:

- Edwin M. Martin (1908–2002), American diplomat and government official
- Edward S. Martin (a.k.a. Edwin S. Martin, 1840–1901), American Civil War sailor and Medal of Honor recipient
- Edwin W. Martin (1917–1991), American diplomat
- Edwin Barnard Martin, member of the British Free Corps during the Second World War
- Edwin Martin (1860–1915), English potter with the Martin Brothers
- Ned Martin (1923–2002), American sportscaster
- Edwin W. Martin Jr., American policymaker in the area of education for people with disabilities
- Edwin “Ed” Martin (1915-2026), American supercentenarian

== See also ==
- Edward Martin (disambiguation)
