= Peter Stewart =

Peter or Pete Stewart may refer to:

- Peter Stewart (athlete) (born 1947), British middle-distance runner
- Peter Stewart (cricketer) (1730–1796), English cricketer
- Peter A. Stewart (1921–1993), Canadian physiologist
- Peter G. Stewart (1809–1900), American pioneer
- Pete Stewart, American singer and songwriter
- Pete Stewart (racing driver) (1931–2013), American NASCAR Cup series driver
- Peter Stewart (Medal of Honor) (1858–1914), USMC gunnery sergeant awarded the Medal of Honor during the Boxer Rebellion
- Peter Stewart (politician), American politician in New Jersey
- Sam Newfield (1889–1964), American film director often credited as Peter Stewart

== See also ==
- Peter Stuart, American singer-songwriter
