= Cypress Hills National Cemetery =

Veterans cemetery in Brooklyn, New York

- United States National Cemetery
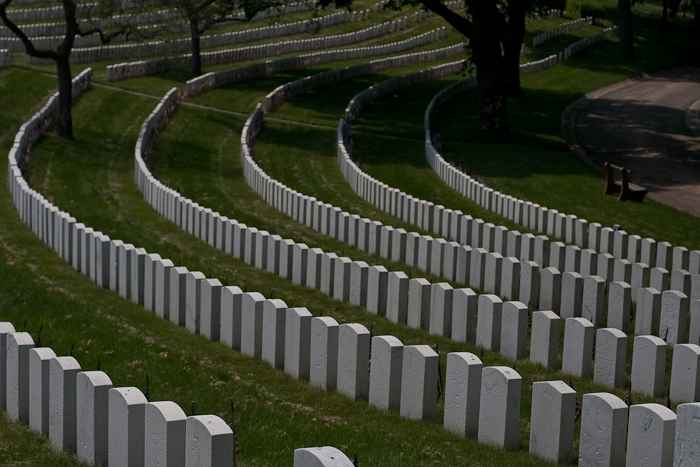
- The Union Plot of Cypress Hills National Cemetery
- For the Americans of all wars
- Location: 40°41′17″N 73°52′55″W near Cypress Hills, Brooklyn, Kings County, New York
- Total burials: >21,000 (through FY 2007)

Cypress Hills National Cemetery is a 18.2-acre (7.4 ha) cemetery located in the Cypress Hills neighborhood of Brooklyn, New York City. It is the only United States National Cemetery in New York City and has more than 21,100 interments of veterans and civilians.

There are 24 Medal of Honor recipients buried in the cemetery, including three men who received the award twice. Although Cypress Hills was established to honor Civil War veterans, its grounds include the graves of soldiers who fought in the American Revolutionary War, Spanish–American War, Korean War and Vietnam War.

Cypress Hills National Cemetery opened in 1862 and gravesites were exhausted in 1954. However, burials of veteran's spouses continues at the rate of approximately ten per year. The two sections of this national cemetery are located approximately one half-mile apart.

== History ==
In 1849 the private Cypress Hills Cemetery was established as a nonsectarian burial ground. On April 21, 1862, the cemetery's board of directors acted upon the request of undertaker A. J. Case to establish a place for burial of United States veterans who died in Brooklyn and the vicinity. With the American Civil War underway, a location was needed for casualties who died in New York hospitals. The board of directors authorized 2.7 acres (1.1 ha) for deceased veterans and was known colloquially as the Union Grounds. Private Alfred Mitchell, a young soldier of the 1st New York Engineers who died on April 13, 1862, was the first Civil War casualty to be interred in the new Union Grounds. Eight years later, an inspection report noted that 3,170 Union soldiers and 461 Confederate prisoners of war were already buried here. Others were brought from cemeteries on Long Island Sound and as far away as Rhode Island.

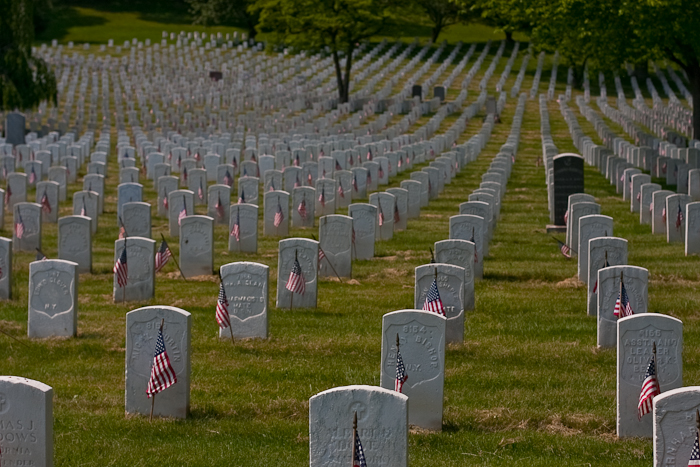
Section 2, Cypress Hills National Cemetery.

In 1870 the private Cypress Hills Cemetery Association deeded the Union Grounds property to the federal government for a consideration of $9,600. Three years later, Congress approved a change in legislation to extend burial rights to honorably discharged soldiers, sailors, and Marines who served in the war. This would necessitate a larger cemetery location for the Brooklyn location. To accommodate the large number of burial requests, the government sought to expand the cemetery. Congress balked at the price asked by the Cypress Hills Cemetery Association, so it went outside the cemetery's boundaries for a new tract. In 1884 the government purchased a 15.4-acre (6.2 ha) parcel from Isaac Snediker, located approximately one half-mile away from the Union Grounds.

These two parcels were joined by a third piece of the private Cypress Hills Cemetery. On September 17, 1941, a 0.06-acre (0.024 ha) parcel known as The Mount of Victory was donated to the United States by the State of New York. There are approximately one dozen graves in this plot, most from the War of 1812. These three parcels combined equal 18.2 acres (7.4 ha), and make up the Cypress Hills National Cemetery.

By the 1950s the area for burials was running out. The government decided that henceforth all New York City area veterans, and spouses, would be interred at the Long Island National Cemetery in Suffolk County, New York. Today the administration of the cemetery is the responsibility of the Farmingdale staff. Cypress Hills National Cemetery has been listed on the National Register of Historic Places since 1997.

Cypress Hills National Cemetery opened in 1862, the same year as Mill Springs National Cemetery in Kentucky, the oldest active national cemetery in the United States. Cypress Hills National Cemetery is two years older than Arlington National Cemetery.

== Sections ==
=== The Union Grounds (Cypress Hill Cemetery) ===
Located on the east slope of the Ridgewood Reservoir, the Union Grounds are in the southwest portion of Cypress Hills Cemetery, 833 Jamaica Avenue. There are more than 3,170 Union soldiers and sailors, and more than 461 captured or surrendered Confederates buried in the Union Grounds. Over the years the bowl-shaped space accepted veterans from other conflicts, up through World War I. Re-interments from other cemeteries added more graves. Most other interments, however, were largely local in nature, due to the cemetery's location in New York State (which contributed the largest numbers of fighting forces in the Civil War) and the adjacent proximity of the cemetery to New York City, the nation's most populous and hence the prime source of Federal enlistments for the war effort.

=== The Mount of Victory (Cypress Hill Cemetery) ===
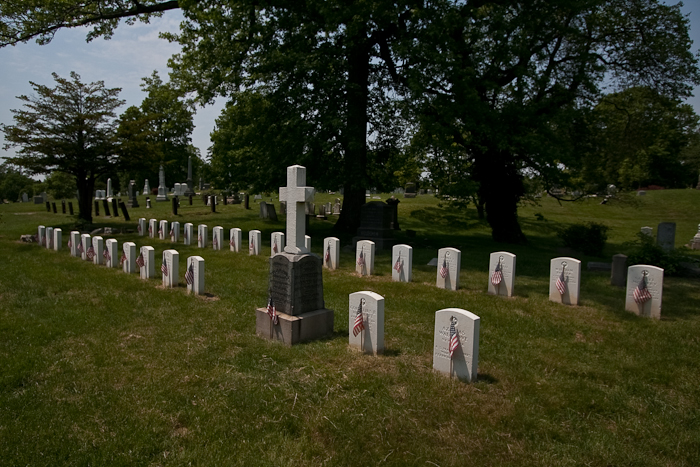
Mount of Victory section contains War of 1812 graves.

Several hundred yards southeast of the Union Grounds, atop one of the higher elevations of Cypress Hill Cemetery, is another section of the national cemetery. In actual size, less than an acre and possessing at least 39 visible veteran headstones and one chaplain monument, The Mount of Victory is the smallest parcel of federal land. It is accentuated by the Eagle Monument (see below), and is visible from West Dolorosa Road. Many of those buried here are veterans of the War of 1812. The Mount of Victory is in Section 2 (plot marked 10) on grid 40.69151° N, 73.87549° W of the cemetery nearby West Dolorosa Road.

=== Cypress Hills National Cemetery ===
The largest of the three sections of the national cemetery is located at 625 Jamaica Avenue. Visitors enter through decorative wrought iron gates constructed in 1886. The visitors lodge, built in 1887, is on the right. This Queen Anne style building has an office, meeting room and museum. There is a grave locator outside the lodge door. This section of the cemetery contains approximately 15,000 graves. Although the parcel is quite narrow, it is long, and leads to a hilltop. The cemetery is divided into 16 sections.

This cemetery also contains three British Commonwealth war graves from World War I – two sailors of the Royal Navy and one of the British Merchant Navy.

== Notable monuments ==
There are several notable monuments in Cypress Hills. These are listed in the order that they were erected:

- The 1881 Garfield Memorial Oak Tree (Union Grounds, Section 1 F, on Cypress Way and Metropolitan Way). On November 3, 1881, the James A. Garfield Oak Society of Brooklyn planted an oak in honor of the slain 20th President of the United States. Following a storm in 1944 that damaged the oak, a new one was planted. At one time an iron fence encircled the memorial.
- The Ringgold Monument (Union Grounds, Section 1B). This large obelisk was erected by veterans who served under Colonel Benjamin Ringgold's command in the Civil War.
- British Navy Monument (Section 2, Grave No. 36). In 1908 workers at Fort Hancock, New Jersey, uncovered a buried earthen brick vault with the remains of a number of men. It was determined this was the crew of a British Navy vessel that perished in 1783 while sailing homeward following the Revolutionary War. On March 5, 1909, the remains were moved to Cypress Hills and interred in a single grave. The headstone—a large granite monument that bears the names of 14 men—was erected in 1939.
- The French Cross to honor French Sailors (Section 3). This 12-foot (3.7 m) granite cross was erected in memory of 25 sailors of the French Navy who died while on duty in American waters in the fall of 1918. The remains of three sailors were repatriated to France; 22 are interred in Cypress Hills.
- Second Division AEF Monument (in front of rostrum).

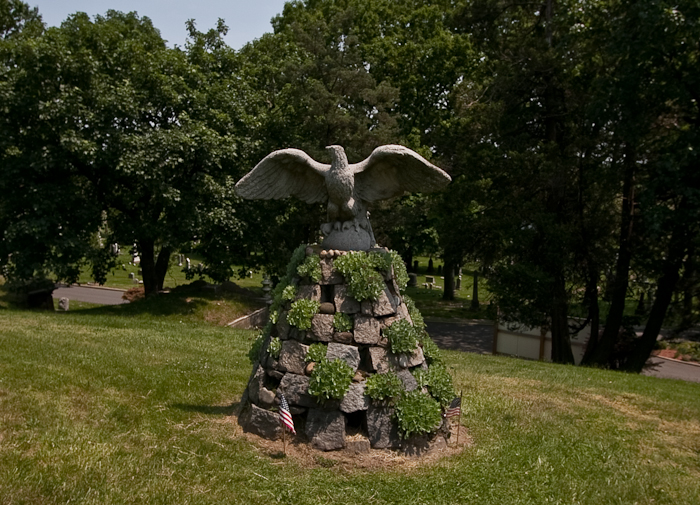
Mount of Victory eagle was erected in the early 1930s.

- The Eagle Monument (Cypress Hills Section 2, The Mount of Victory). This unique hand-crafted monument of fieldstones was created by cemetery laborers around 1934. An American eagle, carved in stone was placed atop the stone pyramid.

== Notable burials ==
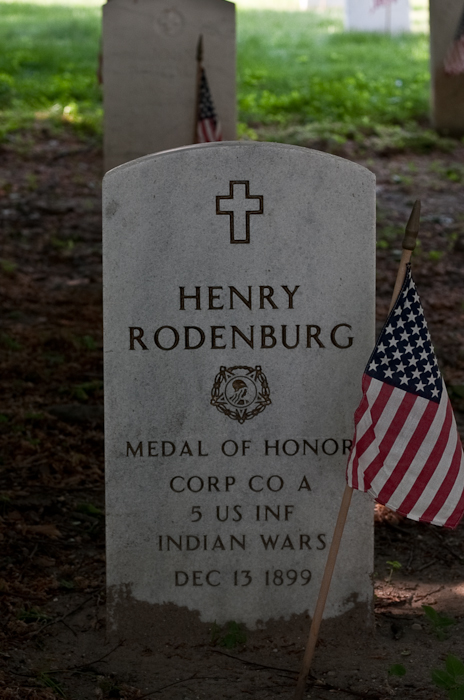
Medal of Honor recipient Henry Rodenburg.

- There are 24 Medal of Honor recipients interred at Cypress Hills
  - Marine Sergeant John Mapes Adams, for action during the Boxer Rebellion
  - Army Sergeant Wilbur E. Colyer, for action at the Battle of Verdun during World War I
  - Coxswain John Cooper, aka John Laver Mather, two time recipient. The first for action on board USS Brooklyn during the Battle of Mobile Bay, and the second a year later while serving on Rear Admiral Henry K. Thatcher's staff in Mobile, Alabama
  - Marine Sergeant Major Daniel Joseph Daly, two time Medal of Honor recipient. The first for action in the Boxer Rebellion, and the second for action in Haiti in 1915
  - Marine Private James Dougherty, for action aboard USS Carondelet (second ship by that name) in Korea in 1871
  - Army Private Christopher Freemeyer, for action in Montana Territory during the Indian Wars
  - Army Sergeant Major Frederick W. Gerber, for 32 years of service to the US Army during the Mexican–American and Civil Wars
  - Army Sergeant Patrick Golden, for action in the Arizona Territory during the Indian Wars
  - Army First Sergeant Edward P. Grimes, for action in Colorado Territory during the Indian Wars
  - Army Sergeant Bernhard Jetter, for action during the Indian Wars
  - Chief Watertender Johannes J. Johannessen, for peace time service aboard USS Iowa
  - Quartermaster Edward S. Martin, for action at the Battle of Mobile Bay during the Civil War
  - Lieutenant Mons Monssen, for peace time service aboard USS Missouri
  - Army Sergeant John Nihill, for action in Arizona Territory during the Indian Wars
  - Quartermaster Third Class Anton Olsen, for action aboard USS Marblehead during the Spanish–American War
  - Army Private Henry Rodenburg, for action in Montana Territory during the Indian Wars
  - Army Sergeant Valentine Rossbach, for action at the Battle of Spotsylvania Court House during the Civil War
  - Army Private John Schiller, for action at the Battle of Chaffin's Farm during the Civil War
  - Chief Watertender Eugene P. Smith, for peace time service aboard USS Decatur
  - Gunner's Mate First Class Wilhelm Smith, for peace time service aboard USS New York
  - Marine Gunnery Sergeant Peter Stewart, for action during the Boxer Rebellion
  - Army Private James W. Webb, for action at the Second Battle of Bull Run during the Civil War
  - Army First Sergeant Henry Wilkens, for action in Montana Territory during the Indian Wars
  - Seaman Louis Williams, a.k.a. Ludwig Andreas Olsen, two time recipient. Both medals were for peace time service aboard USS Lackawanna
- Other notable interments
  - Robert Osborne Abbott, American Civil War surgeon, and medical director, Department of Washington
  - Edward J. Coughlin, New York state politician, veteran of World War I
  - Hiram Cronk, soldier with the New York Volunteers, the last surviving veteran of the War of 1812 as of the date of his death in 1905
  - General Thomas W. Egan, 40th New York Volunteer Infantry Regiment, Civil War
  - Brevet Brigadier General William Gates, veteran of the War of 1812, Seminole War, Mexican War and Civil War
  - Mohammed Kahn, a.k.a. John Ammahaie, Afghan-American Muslim veteran of the Civil War
  - William "Wild Bill" Lovett, leader of the White Hand Gang, veteran of World War I
  - Giovanni Martino, a.k.a. John Martin, Italian-American veteran of the Indian Wars and the Spanish–American War
  - Brevet Brigadier General Robert Nugent, Irish-American veteran of the Civil War and Indian Wars
  - Colonel Benjamin Kendrick Pierce, veteran of the War of 1812, Second Seminole War, and Mexican–American War, and brother of President Franklin Pierce
  - Brevet Colonel Thomas Benton Weir, veteran of the Civil War and Indian Wars

== Gallery ==
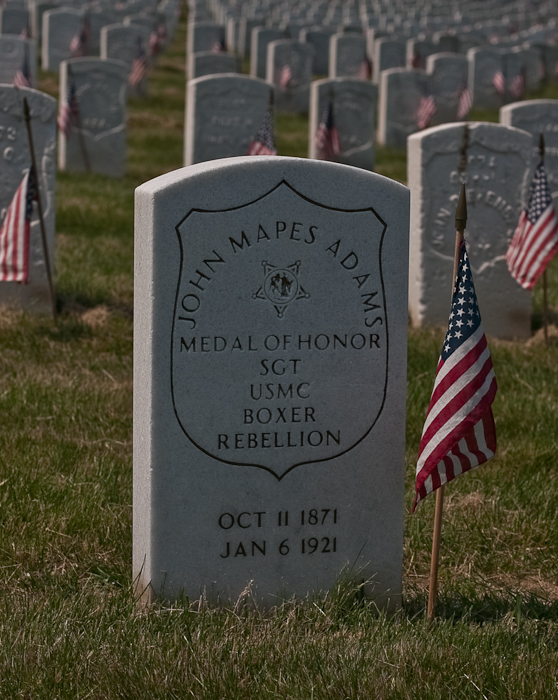
Marine Sergeant John Mapes Adams, Medal of Honor recipient for action during the Boxer Rebellion.

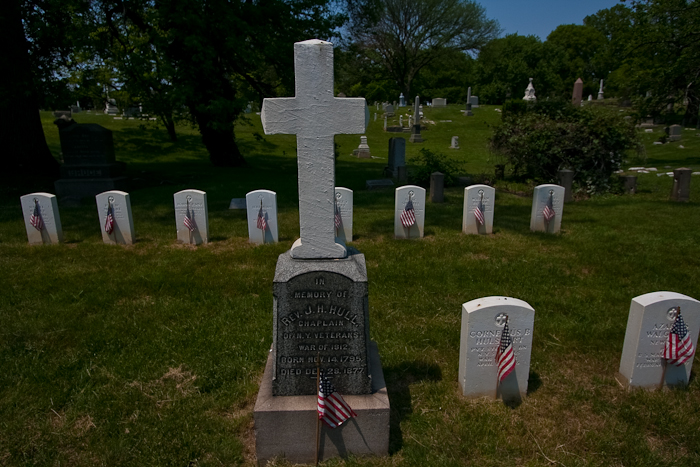
Chaplain J. H. Hull, veteran of the War of 1812, Mount of Victory section.

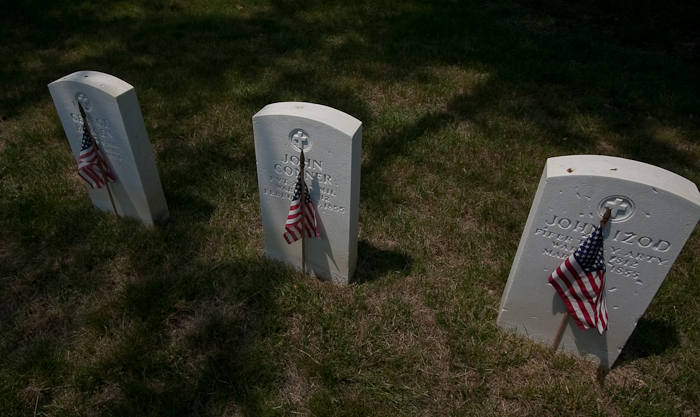
Mount of Victory section, War of 1812 graves.

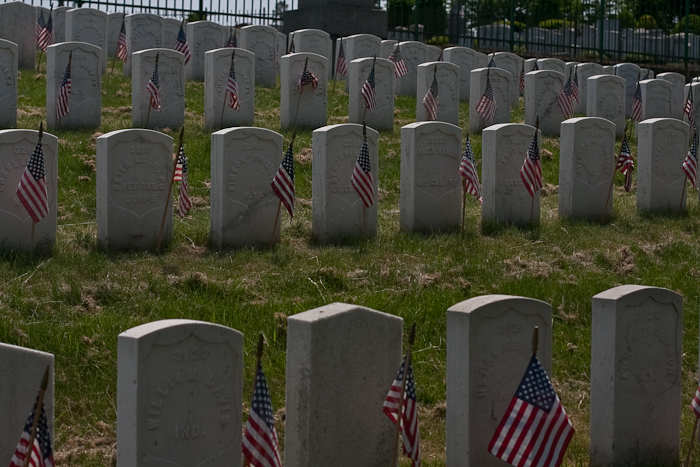
The "Old Field" with Civil War graves.

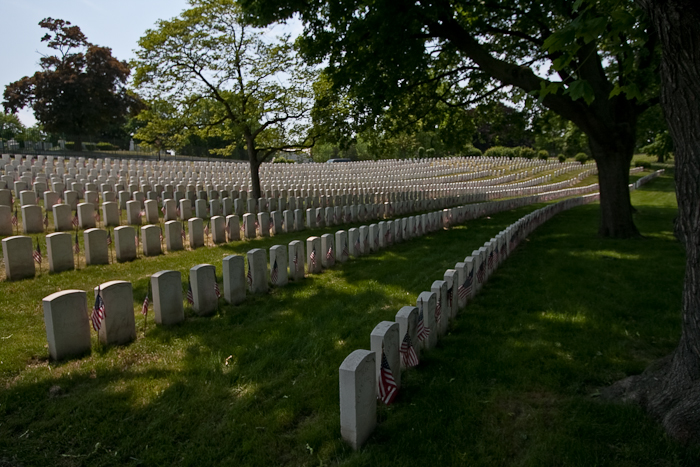
Union Plot in Cypress Hills.

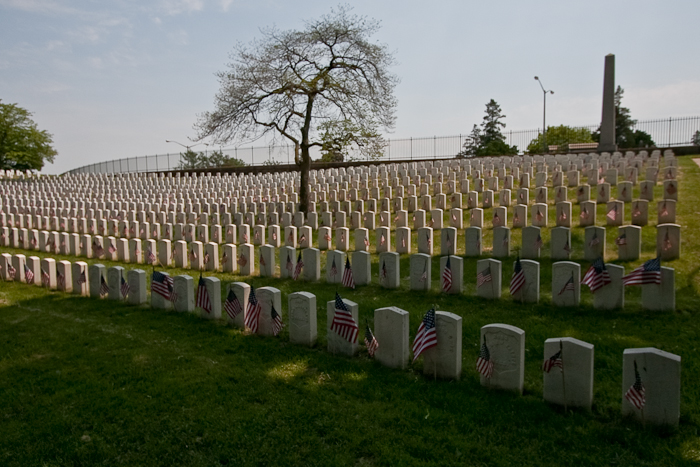
In the distance is the Ringgold Monument in the Union Grounds, Section 1B.

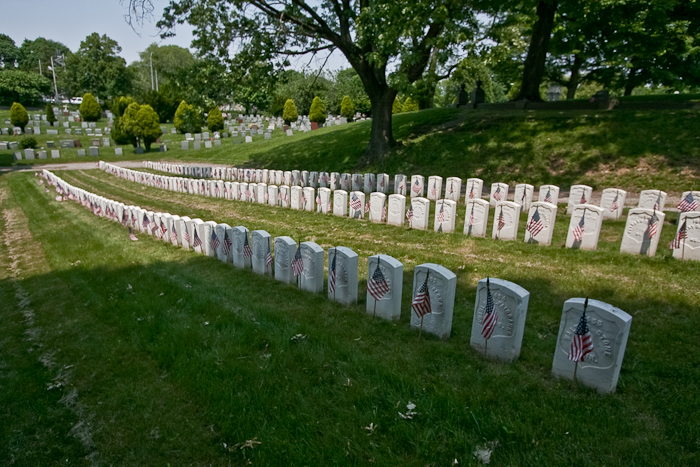
Union Grounds in Cypress Hills.

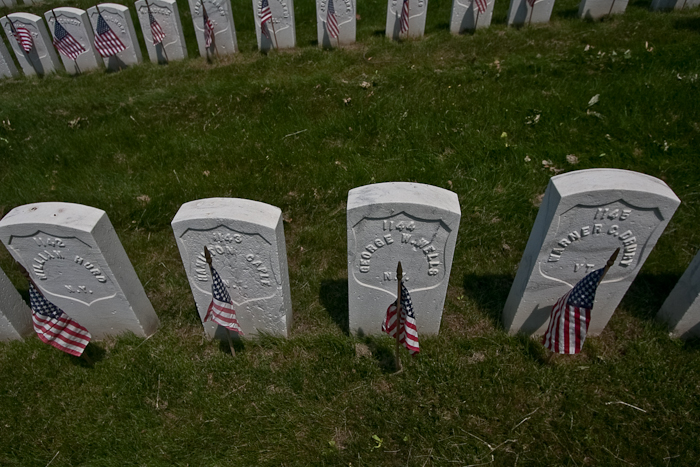
Union soldiers from the Civil War in the "Old Field."

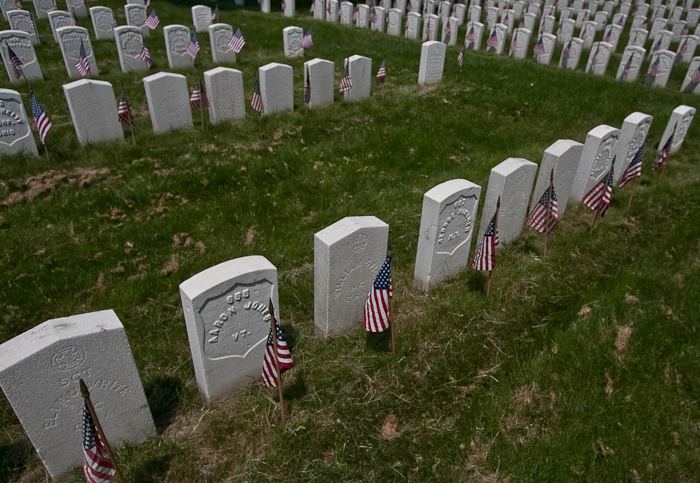
Confederates and Union veterans buried side by side in the Union Grounds.

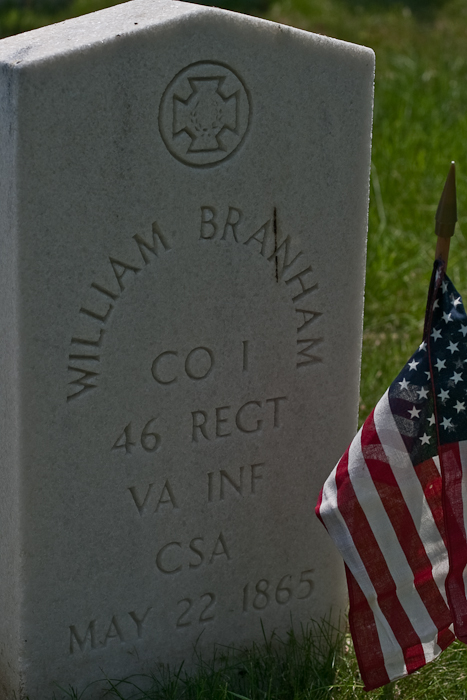
CSA soldier William Branham, Union Grounds.

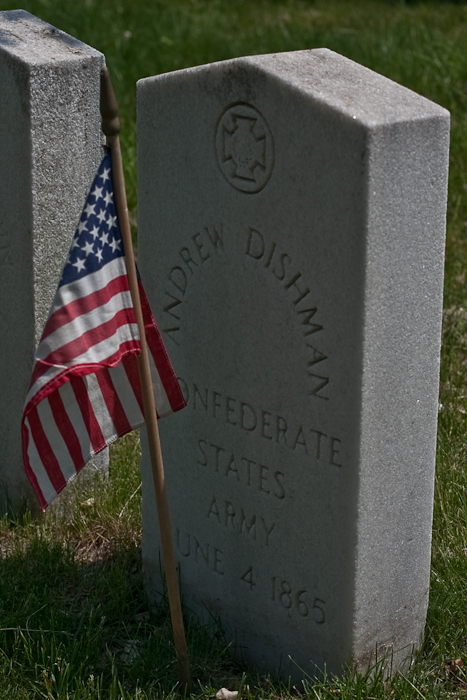
CSA soldier Andrew Dishman, Union Grounds.

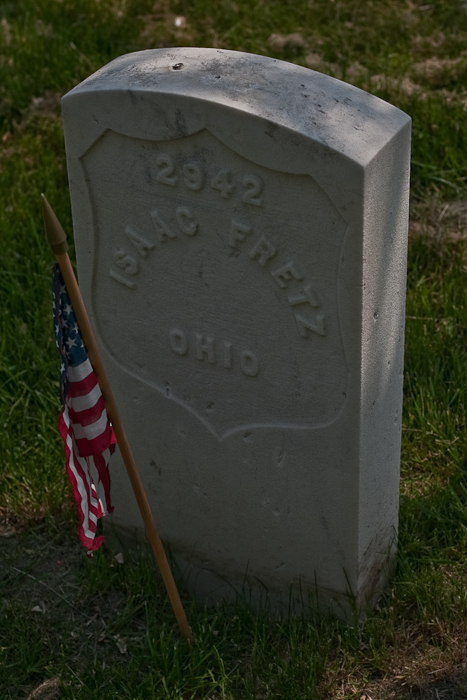
Union soldier Isaac Fretz, Union Grounds.

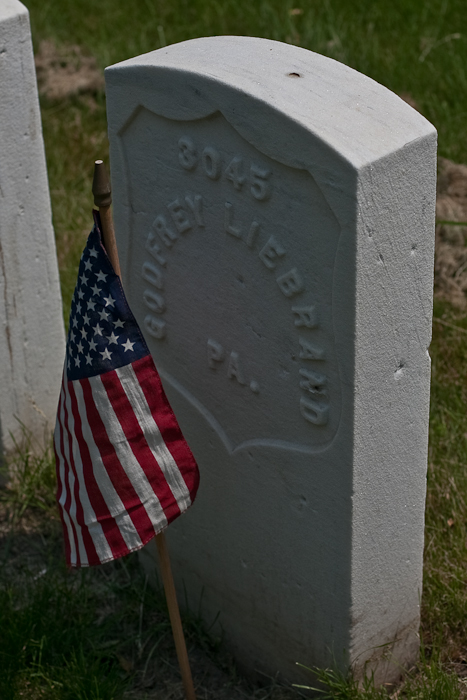
Union soldier Godfrey Liebrand, Union Grounds.

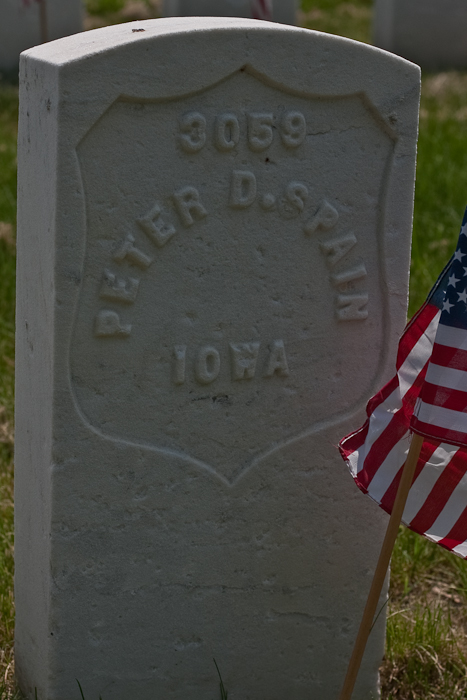
Union soldier Peter D. Spain, Union Grounds.

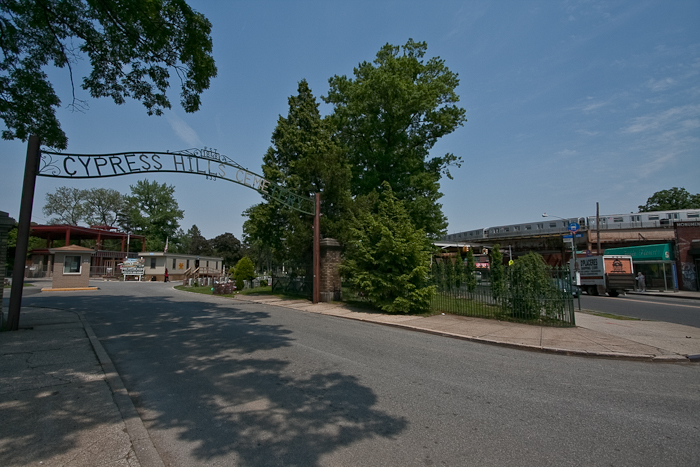
Main entrance to Cypress Hills Cemetery, the private cemetery where two portions of the National Cemetery are located. The Cypress Hills station is across Jamaica Avenue.

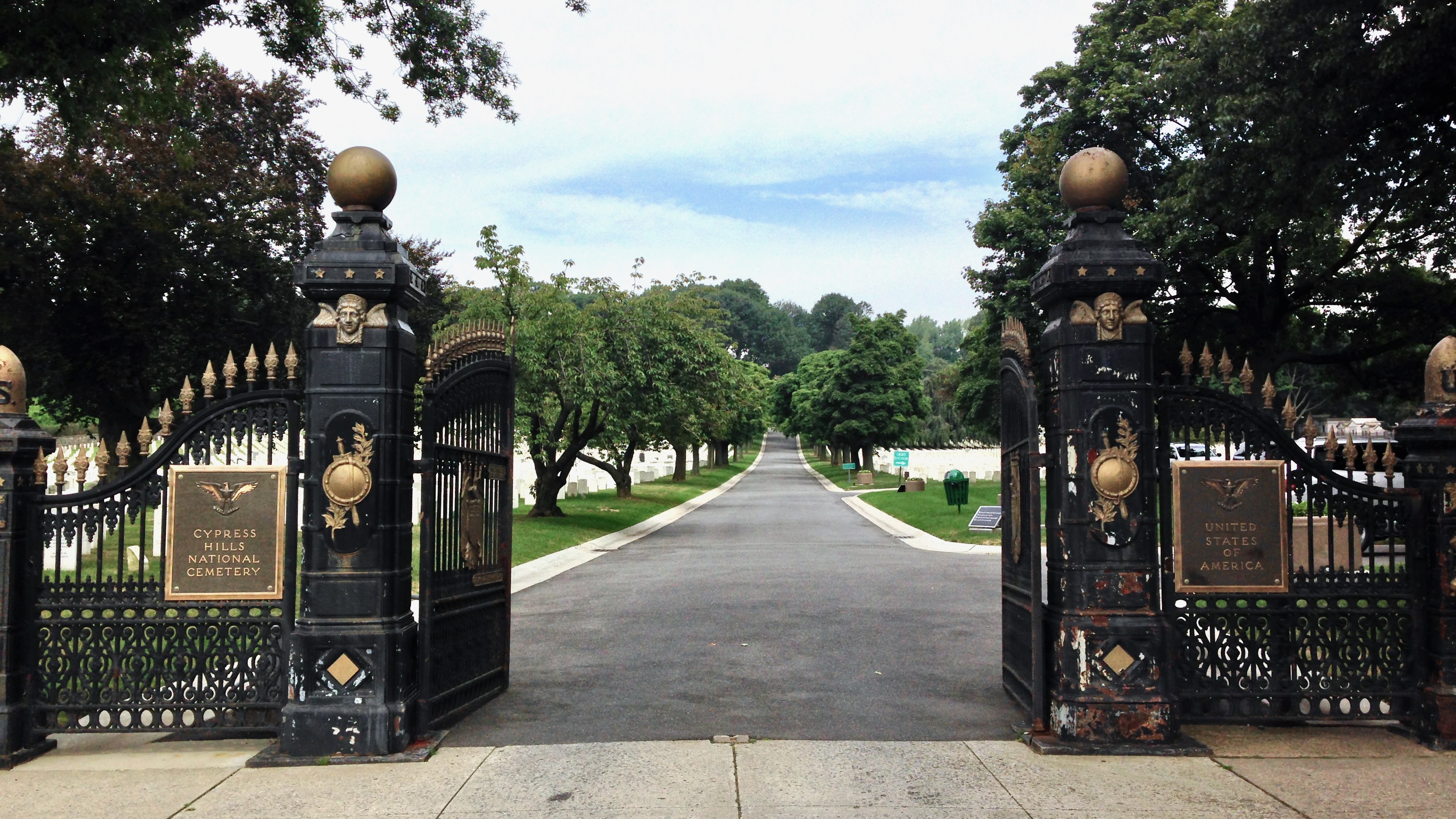
Main entrance to Cypress Hills National Cemetery, located at 625 Jamaica Avenue.

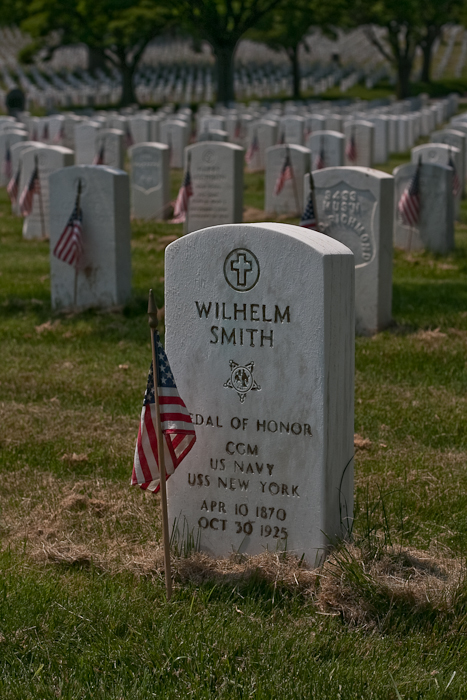
Medal of Honor recipient Wilhelm Smith.

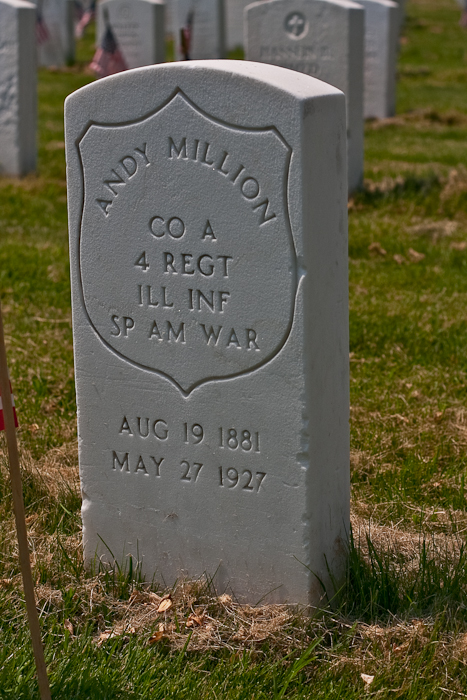
Spanish–American War veteran Andy Million.

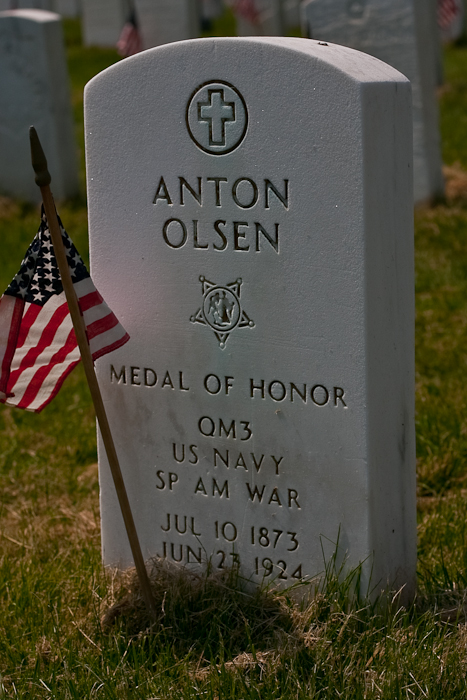
Medal of Honor recipient Anton Olsen.

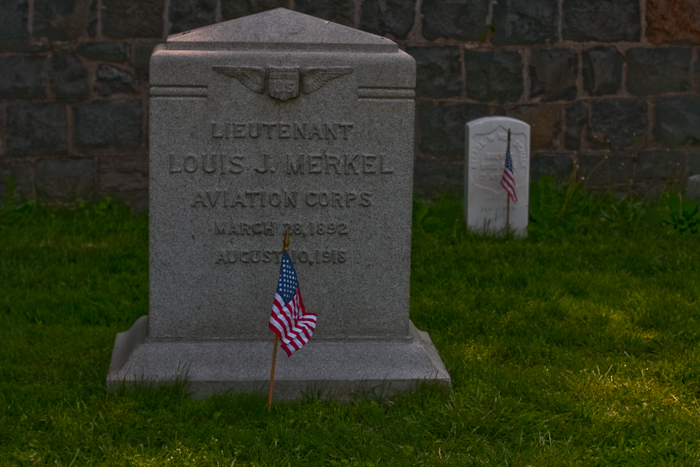
World War I aviation corps Lt. Louis J. Merkel.

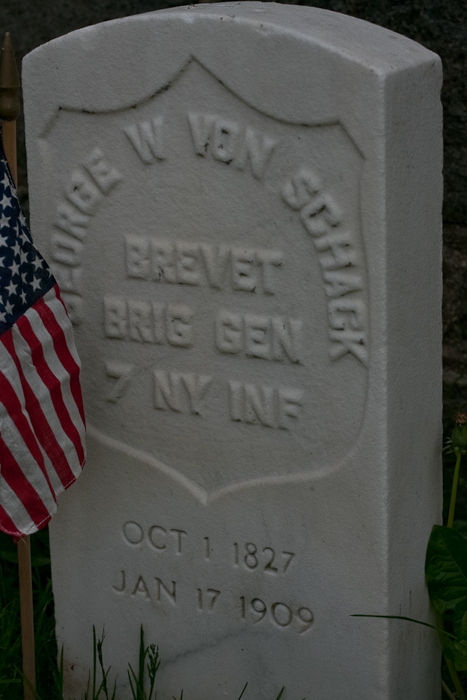
Brevet Brigadier General George W. Von Schack, 7th New York Volunteers.

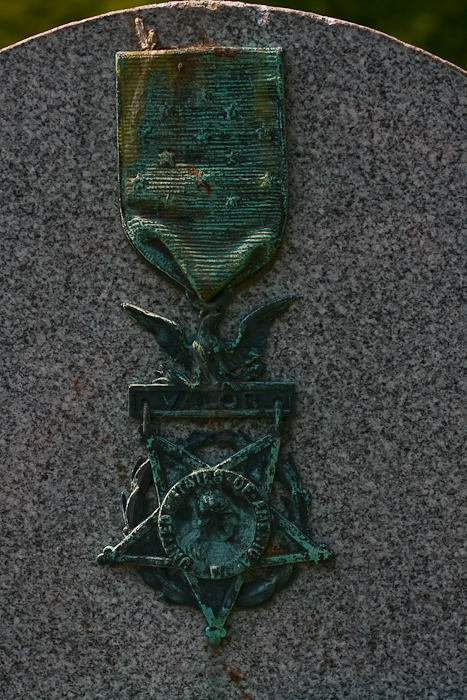
Detail of grave of Medal of Honor recipient Wilbur E. Colyer.

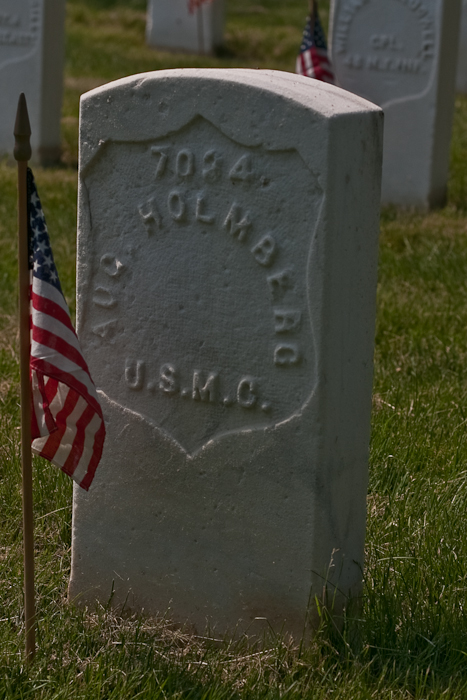
Marine veteran Aug. Holmberg.

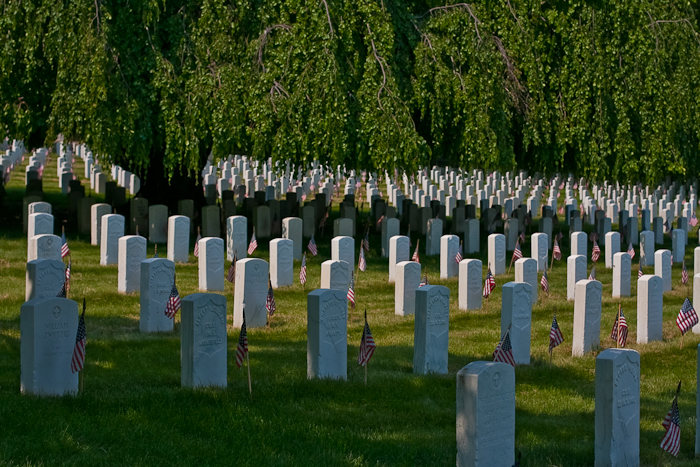
Cypress Hills National Cemetery.

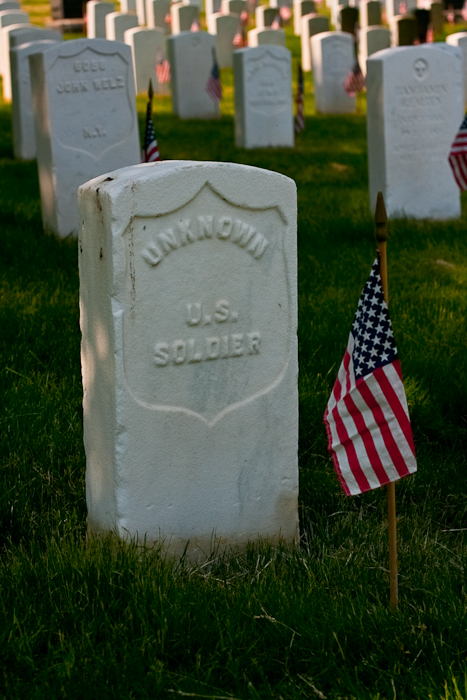
Unknown soldier.

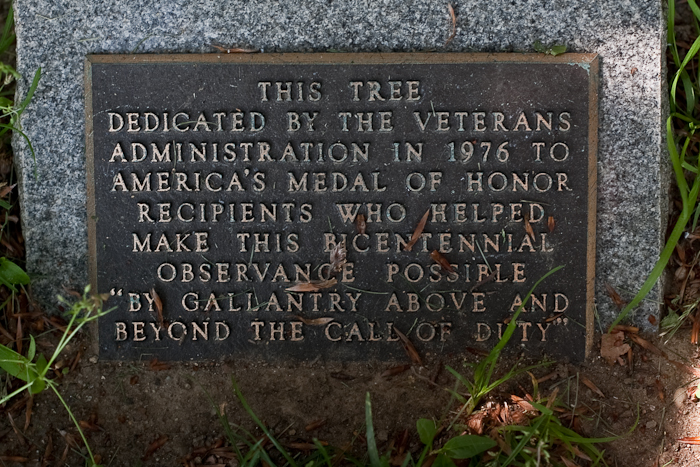
Plaque dedicated in 1976 for U.S. Bicentennial.

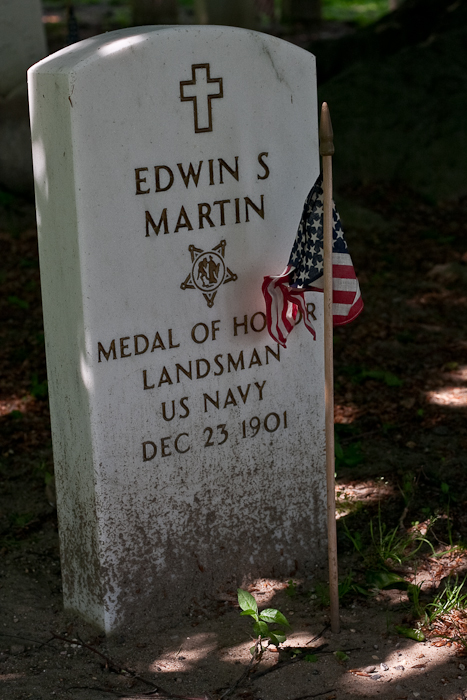
Medal of Honor recipient Edwin S. Martin.

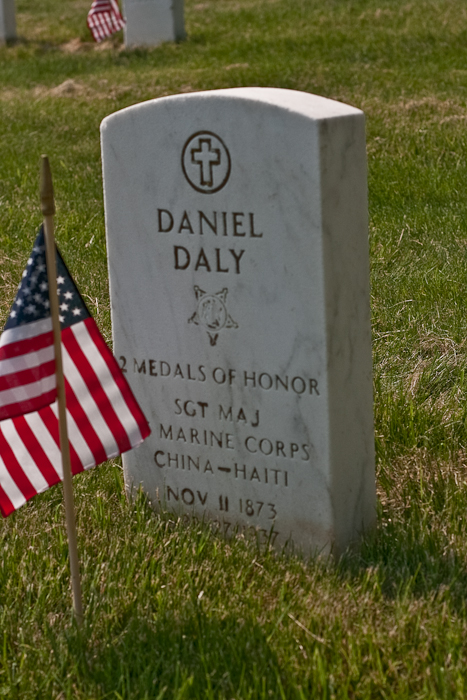
Two-time Medal of Honor recipient Daniel Daly.

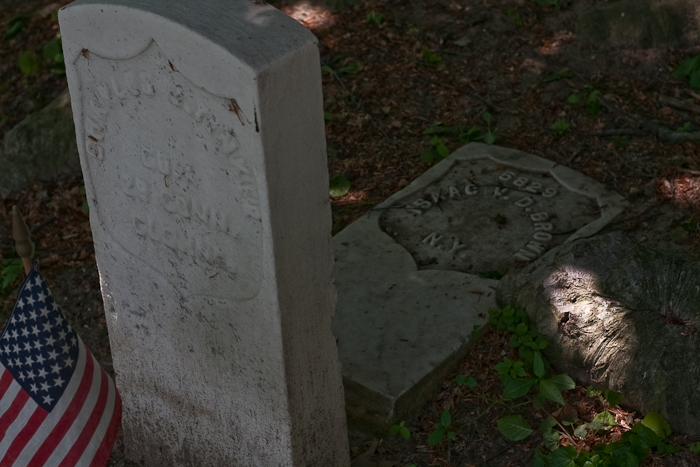
Civil War graves.

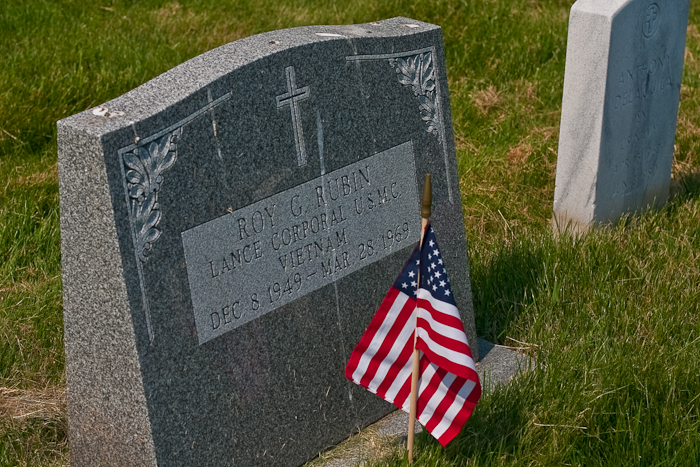
One of the few Vietnam War graves, Marine Lance Corporal Roy G. Rubin, buried more than 15 years after Cypress Hills filled up.

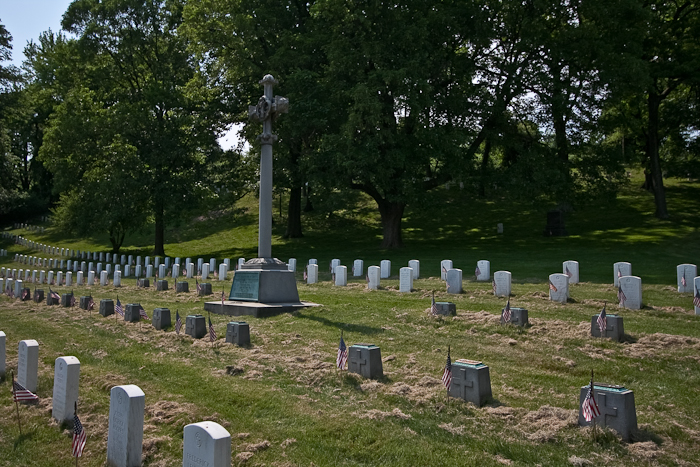
The French Cross to honor French Sailors (Section 3).

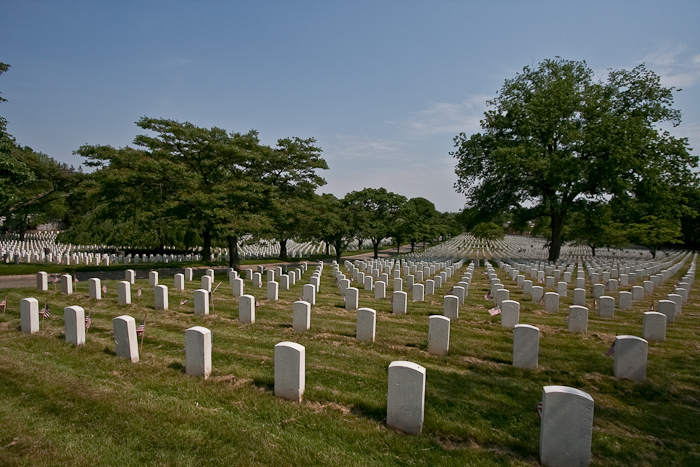
Cypress Hills National Cemetery.

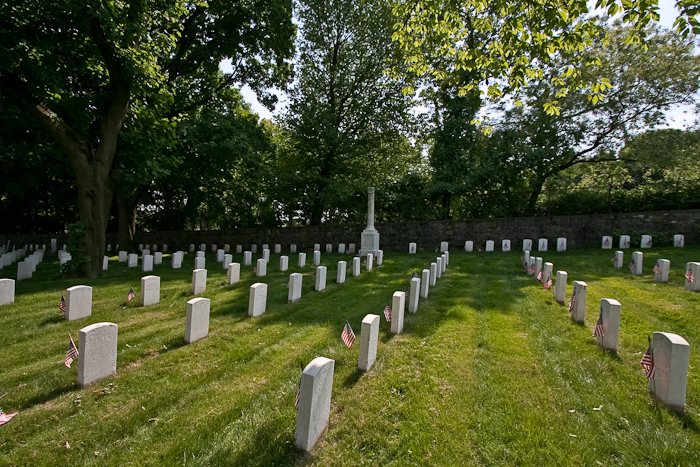
Cypress Hills National Cemetery.

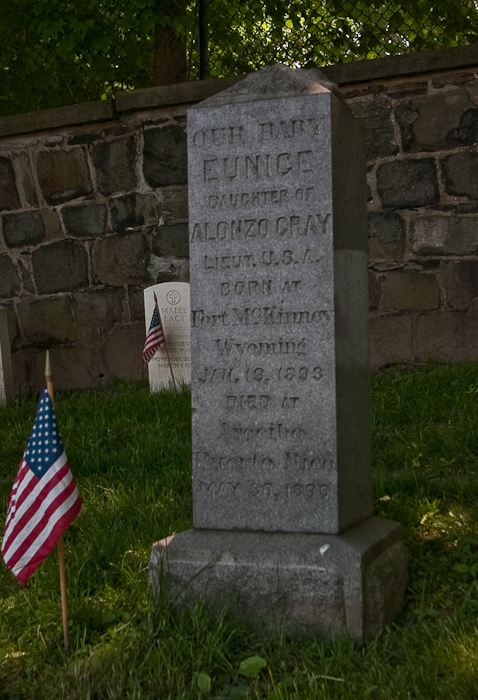
Memorial to Eunice Gray, daughter of a soldier, who died in Puerto Rico.
