= John Schiller =

- Born: March 7, 1830; Germany
- Died: June 3, 1926 (aged 96); New York City
- Burial place: Cypress Hills National Cemetery
- Military career
- Allegiance: United States of America; Union
- Branch: United States Army; Union Army
- Rank: private
- Units: Company E, 158th New York Infantry
- Conflicts: American Civil War • Battle of Chaffin's Farm
- Awards: Medal of Honor

John Schiller (March 7, 1830 – June 3, 1926) (born John Schilling) was an enlisted soldier in the U.S. Army during the American Civil War. He received the Medal of Honor for his actions during the Battle of Chaffin's Farm on September 29, 1864.

== Military service ==
Emigrating from his native Germany, his surname was originally Schilling. He volunteered for service with the 158th regiment of New York Infantry, part of the Empire-Spinola Brigade which was organized in Brooklyn in August 1862. Assigned to the Union XVIII Corps, the regiment lost during service two officers and 45 enlisted men killed and mortally wounded and 83 enlisted men by disease.

At the Battle of Chaffin's Farm, Private Schiller led a Union infantry advance into the Confederate trench works. His actions in this battle resulted in the awarding of the Medal of Honor.

Schiller died at age 96 and was buried at Cypress Hills National Cemetery in Brooklyn.

== Medal of Honor citation ==
The President of the United States of America, in the name of Congress, takes pleasure in presenting the Medal of Honor to Private John Schiller, United States Army, for extraordinary heroism on 29 September 1864, while serving with Company E, 158th New York Infantry, in action at Chaffin's Farm, Virginia. Private Schiller advanced to the ditch of the enemy's works.

== See also ==
- List of Medal of Honor recipients
- List of American Civil War Medal of Honor recipients: Q–S
