= Bernhard Jetter =

United States Army Medal of Honor recipient (1862–1927)

- Born: February 26, 1862; Kingdom of Württemberg, German Empire
- Died: August 23, 1927 (aged 65); Brooklyn, New York, United States
- Burial place: Cypress Hills National Cemetery
- Spouse: Rose Elizabeth Wagner (m. 1916)
- Military career
- Allegiance: United States of America
- Branch: United States Army
- Service years: 1883 – 1896
- Rank: First Sergeant
- Unit: 7th U.S. Cavalry
- Conflicts: Indian campaigns
- Awards: Medal of Honor

Bernhard Jetter (February 26, 1862 – August 23, 1927) was a Kingdom of Württemberg-born soldier in the U.S. Army who served with the 7th U.S. Cavalry during the Indian Wars. He was one of twenty men who received the Medal of Honor for gallantry against the Dakota at the Battle of Wounded Knee, but now called the Wounded Knee Massacre, in South Dakota on December 29, 1890.

== Biography ==
Bernhard Jetter was born in the Kingdom of Württemberg in 1862. He immigrated into the United States at New York City, New York, on April 17, 1881. He enlisted in K Troop, 7th Cavalry Regiment, U.S. Army on May 5, 1883, in New York City. He was promoted to sergeant; he was discharged on May 4, 1888, upon his termination of service at Rapid City, Dakota Territory with a character rating of excellent. Bernard Jetter (sic) re-enlisted near Rapid City on June 5, 1888.

Jetter was among the cavalry troops sent to arrest Chief Big Foot and disarm his Sioux followers and, on the morning of December 29, 1890, surrounded their camp on the banks of Wounded Knee Creek. In the ensuing Wounded Knee Massacre, Jetter and several other soldiers took part in search-and-destroy missions along White Clay Creek and were cited for "distinguished bravery" in skirmishes against the Sioux. Jetter himself was witnessed "killing an Indian who was in the act of killing a wounded man" in his unit. He and nineteen other members of his regiment were awarded the Medal of Honor on April 24, 1891.

Jetter was discharged as a first sergeant on June 4, 1893, at Fort Sheridan. He immediately re-enlisted on June 5, 1893, at Fort Sheridan. Jetter was naturalized as a U.S. Citizen on July 10, 1896, in the U.S. District Court in New York, New York; his occupation at the time was "U.S. soldier." He was discharged by authority of a special order on September 4, 1896, as a first sergeant at Fort Huachuca, Arizona Territory was a character rating of excellent.

Jetter married Rose Elizabeth Wagner on June 3, 1916, in New York, New York, giving his marital status as widowed.

Jetter returned to Brooklyn after leaving military service and died in Brooklyn on August 23, 1927, at the age of 65; his wife Rose survived him. He was interred at Cypress Hills National Cemetery.

== Medal of Honor citation ==
Rank and organization: Sergeant, Company K, 7th U.S. Cavalry. Place and date: At Sioux campaign, December 1890. Entered service at: ------. Birth: Germany. Date of issue: 24 April 1891.

Citation:

Distinguished bravery.

== See also ==
- List of Medal of Honor recipients for the Indian Wars
