= Patrick Golden =

United States Army Medal of Honor recipient (1836–1872)

- Born: c. 1836; County Sligo, Ireland
- Died: May 25, 1872 (aged 36); Brooklyn, New York, United States
- Burial place: Cypress Hills National Cemetery
- Military career
- Allegiance: United States of America
- Branch: United States Army
- Service years: c. 1868–c. 1872
- Rank: Sergeant
- Unit: 8th U.S. Cavalry
- Conflicts: Indian Wars
- Awards: Medal of Honor

Patrick Golden (c. 1836 – May 25, 1872) was an Irish-born soldier in the U.S. Army who served with the 8th U.S. Cavalry during the Indian Wars. He was one of 34 men received the Medal of Honor for "bravery in scouts and actions" in several engagements against the Apache Indians in the Arizona Territory from August to October 1868.

== Biography ==
A native of County Sligo, Ireland, Patrick Golden emigrated to the United States and eventually enlisted in the U.S. Army in San Francisco, California. He became a member of the 8th U.S. Cavalry and was assigned to frontier duty in the Arizona Territory. From August to October 1868, Golden was part of a small force, one of two companies numbering 50–60 troopers, tasked to protect settlements from Apache war parties. In this 90-day period, Golden and other soldiers frequently faced the Apaches in heavy fighting, especially in ambushes and sniper attacks, during their patrols. At the end of the campaign, Golden was one of 34 soldiers to receive the Medal of Honor for "bravery in scouts and actions against Indians". The men of the regiment were officially issued the award on July 24, 1869, in one of the largest Medal of Honor presentations at the time. Golden died in Brooklyn, New York on May 25, 1872, at age 36. He was buried in Cypress Hills National Cemetery.

== Medal of Honor citation ==
Rank and organization: Sergeant, Company B, 8th U.S. Cavalry. Place and date: Arizona, August to October 1868. Entered service at: ------. Birth: Ireland. Date of issue: 24 July 1869.

Citation:

Bravery in scouts and actions against Indians.

== See also ==
- List of Medal of Honor recipients for the Indian Wars
