= James Webb (Medal of Honor) =

American soldier

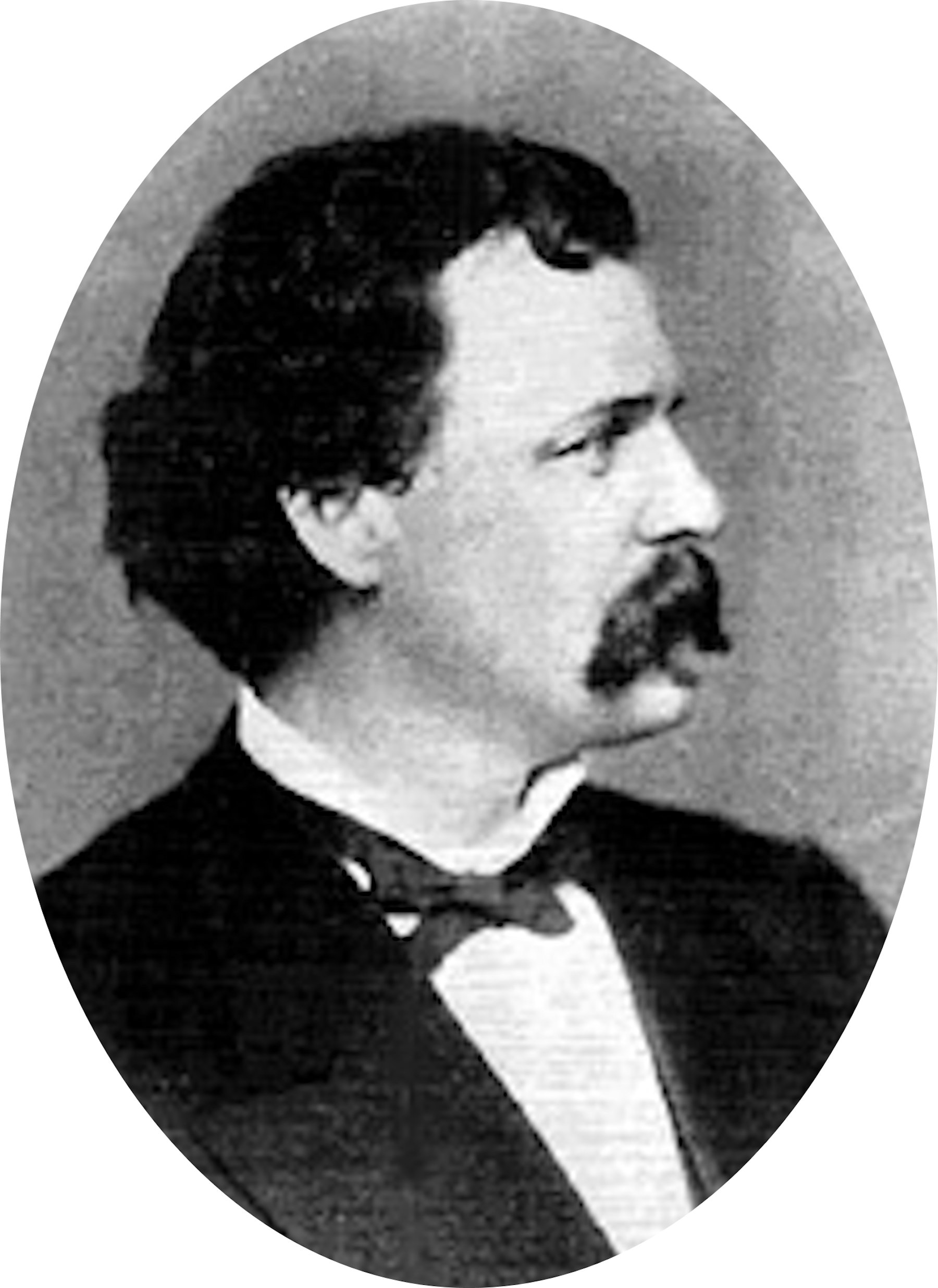
- Born: September 2, 1841; Brooklyn, New York
- Died: June 7, 1915 (aged 73) Brooklyn, New York
- Buried: Cypress Hills National Cemetery
- Awards: Medal of Honor

James W. Webb (September 2, 1841 – June 7, 1915) was an American soldier who fought in the Union Army during the American Civil War. He received the Medal of Honor on September 17, 1897, for actions as a private with the 5th New York Infantry during the Second Battle of Bull Run on August 30, 1862. He was born in Brooklyn, Kings County, New York on September 2, 1841 and died from pneumonia at Kings County Hospital there on June 7, 1915. He is buried in Cypress Hills National Cemetery in Brooklyn.

== Medal of Honor citation ==
Under heavy fire voluntarily carried information to a battery commander that enabled him to save his guns from capture. Was severely wounded, but refused to go to the hospital and participated in the remainder of the campaign.
