= Johannes J. Johannessen =

United States Navy Medal of Honor recipient (1872–1915)

- Born: Johannes Jeremias Johannessen; May 13, 1872; Bodø, Norway
- Died: November 14, 1915 (aged 43)
- Burial place: Cypress Hills National Cemetery
- Military career
- Allegiance: United States of America
- Branch: United States Navy
- Rank: Chief Watertender
- Unit: USS Iowa (BB-4)
- Awards: Medal of Honor

Johannes J. Johannessen (May 13, 1872 – November 14, 1915) was a sailor serving in the United States Navy who received the Medal of Honor for bravery.

== Biography ==
Johannessen was born May 13, 1872, in Bodø, Norway, and after immigrating to the United States he joined the navy. He was stationed aboard the USS Iowa (BB-4) as a chief watertender when, on January 25, 1905, a manhole plate blew out of boiler D. For his actions received the Medal of Honor March 20, 1905.

He died on November 14, 1915, and a funeral service was held at Zion Lutheran Church in Brooklyn, New York on November 22. He is buried in Cypress Hills National Cemetery in Brooklyn.

== Medal of Honor citation ==
Rank and organization: Chief Watertender, U.S. Navy. Born: 13 May 1872, Bodø, Norway. Enlisted at: Yokohama, Japan. G.O. No.: 182, 20 March 1905.

Citation:

Serving on board the U.S.S. Iowa, for extraordinary heroism at the time of the blowing out of the manhole plate of boiler D on board that vessel, 25 January 1905.

== See also ==
- List of Medal of Honor recipients during peacetime
