= Anton Olsen (Medal of Honor) =

American navy quartermaster (1873–1924)

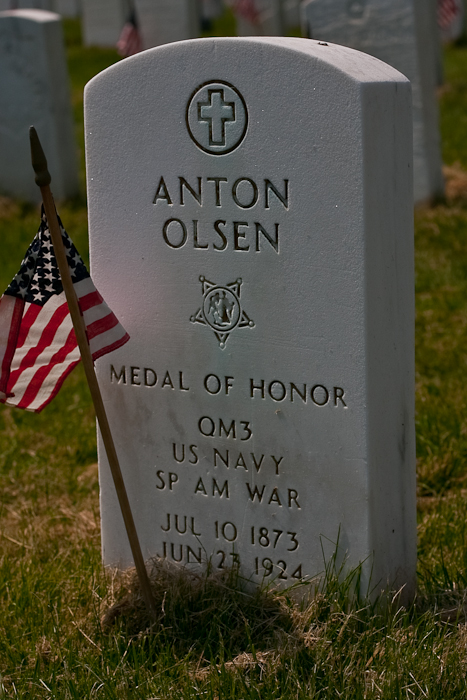
- Anton Olsen's gravestone in Cypress Hills National Cemetery, Section 2, Grave 9158.
- Born: July 10, 1873; Norway
- Died: June 23, 1924 (aged 50); New York City, U.S.
- Burial place: Cypress Hills National Cemetery
- Military career
- Allegiance: United States of America
- Branch: United States Navy
- Unit: USS Marblehead
- Conflicts: Spanish–American War
- Awards: Medal of Honor

Ordinary Seaman Anton Olsen (July 10, 1873 – June 23, 1924) was a Norwegian-born United States Navy quartermaster who received the Medal of Honor.

== Medal of Honor recipient ==
Olsen died at Metropolitan Hospital in Brooklyn on June 23, 1924. He is buried at Cypress Hills National Cemetery in New York City, Section 2, Grave No. 9158.

- Rank and organization: Ordinary Seaman, U.S. Navy
- Born: 26 April 1867, in Norway
- Accredited to: Massachusetts
- G.O. No.: 529, 2 November 1899

=== Citation ===
On board the USS Marblehead during the operation of cutting the cable leading from Cienfuegos, Cuba, 11 May 1898. Facing the heavy fire of the enemy, Olsen displayed extraordinary bravery and coolness throughout this period.

== See also ==
- List of Medal of Honor recipients for the Spanish–American War
