= John Laver Mather Cooper =

United States Navy Medal of Honor recipient

- Born: July 24, 1828; Dublin, Ireland
- Died: August 22, 1891 (aged 63)
- Burial place: Cypress Hills National Cemetery, Brooklyn, New York
- Military career
- Allegiance: United States of America
- Branch: United States Navy
- Service years: 1845 - 1866
- Rank: Quartermaster
- Nickname: John Cooper
- Unit: USS Brooklyn (1858)
- Conflicts: American Civil War; *Battle of Mobile Bay
- Awards: Medal of Honor (2)

John Cooper (July 24, 1828 – August 22, 1891) (born as John Laver Mather Cooper) was a member of the United States Navy. He is one of only nineteen people who have received the Medal of Honor twice and one of only fourteen to receive the Medal of Honor for two distinct events.

His first such award came about because of his actions aboard the USS Brooklyn (1858) during the Battle of Mobile Bay, August 5, 1864. The second award was a result of an accidental fire in which Cooper advanced through the burning area in order to rescue a wounded man from certain death on April 26, 1865.

He was buried at Cypress Hills National Cemetery, Section 2, Grave 5022, in Brooklyn, New York.

== Medal of Honor citations ==
Rank and organization: Coxswain, U.S. Navy. Born: 1832, Ireland. Accredited to: New York. G.O. No.: 45, December 31, 1864. Second award.

=== First award ===
Citation:

On board the U.S.S. Brooklyn during action against rebel forts and gunboats and with the ram Tennessee, in Mobile Bay, 5 August 1864. Despite severe damage to his ship and the loss of several men on board as enemy fire raked her decks from stem to stern, Cooper fought his gun with skill and courage throughout the furious battle which resulted in the surrender of the prize rebel ram Tennessee and in the damaging and destruction of batteries at Fort Morgan.

=== Second award ===
G.O. No.: 62, June 29, 1865.

Citation:

Served as quartermaster on Acting Rear Admiral Thatcher's staff. During the terrific fire at Mobile, on 26 April 1865, at the risk of being blown to pieces by exploding shells, Cooper advanced through the burning locality, rescued a wounded man from certain death, and bore him on his back to a place of safety.

== See also ==
- List of Medal of Honor recipients
- List of American Civil War Medal of Honor recipients: A–F
