= Edward Martin =

Edward Martin may refer to:

== Government and politics ==
- Edward L. Martin (1837–1897), U.S. representative from Delaware
- Edward Lowe Martin (1842–1912), Kansas City mayor
- Edward Martin (Pennsylvania politician) (1879–1967), governor of Pennsylvania and U.S. senator
- Edward T. Martin (1910–1984), former Massachusetts Attorney General
- Ed Martin (Missouri politician) (born 1970), Missouri politician and United States Pardon Attorney

== Military ==
- Edward D. Martin, United States Navy rear admiral and acting assistant secretary of defense (1993, 1997)
- Edward Fowell Martin (1875–1950), Australian Army brigadier general who served in World War I
- Edward H. Martin (1931–2014), vice admiral in the United States Navy
- Edward S. Martin (1840–1901), American Civil War sailor and Medal of Honor recipient

== Sports ==
- Ed Martin (American football) (born 1962), American professional football player, 1984–1986
- Edward Martin (basketball) (1925–2002), American college basketball coach and Negro leagues baseball player
- Ed Martin (boxer) (1881–1937), World Colored Heavyweight Champion, 1902–1903
- Edward Martin (cricketer) (1814–1869), English cricketer
- Edward Martin (rugby league) (1912–1937), Australian rugby league player

== Other ==
- Edward Pritchard Martin (1844–1910), British engineer and steel maker
- Edward Sandford Martin (1856–1939), American journalist and editor
- Edward Martin (pioneer) (1818–1882), missionary and pioneer with the Church of Jesus Christ of Latter-day Saints
- Edward Martin (Queens') (died 1662), English clergyman and college president
- Kwasi Jones Martin, born Edward Martin, English songwriter and producer

== See also ==
- Eddie "Ed" Martin, the person behind the 1990s University of Michigan basketball scandal
- Eddy Martin (born 1990), American actor
- Edward Martyn (1859–1923), Irish activist and playwright
