= Henry Rodenburg =

U.S. Army soldier who received the Medal of Honor

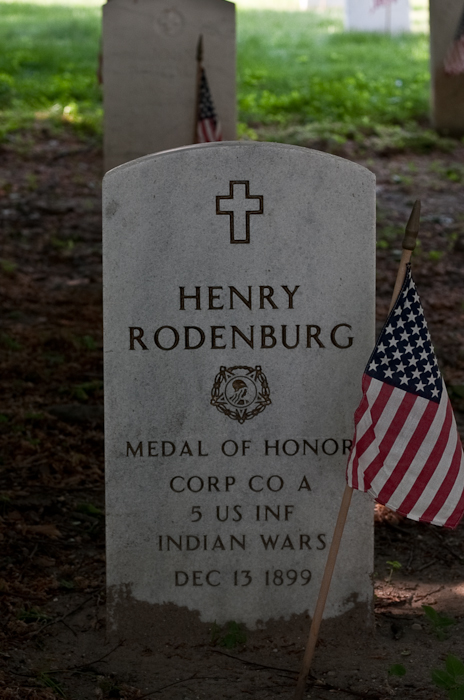
- Grave of Henry Rodenburg
- Born: c. 1851; Germany
- Died: December 13, 1899 (aged 48); New York City, US
- Burial place: Cypress Hills National Cemetery
- Military career
- Allegiance: United States of America
- Branch: United States Army
- Rank: Corporal
- Conflicts: Indian Wars
- Awards: Medal of Honor

Henry Rodenburg (c. 1851–13 December 1899) was a United States Army soldier who received the Medal of Honor. His award came for gallantry in the Indian Wars.

== Biography ==
Rodenburg was born in Germany in 1851. He joined the army and achieved the rank of corporal.

Rodenburg died on 13 December 1899 and is buried in Cypress Hills National Cemetery in New York City.

== Medal of Honor citation ==
"For gallantry in engagements at Cedar Creek, Montana and other campaigns during the period 21 October 1876 to 8 January 1877, while serving with Company A, 5th U.S. Infantry. Private Rodenburg served in a series of engagements against the Sioux Indians in the Montana Territory. In actions at Cedar Creek, Private Rodenburg personally helped in the security of settlers throughout the region. For extreme gallantry, he was awarded the Medal of Honor and promoted Corporal. Date of Issue: 27 April 1877."

== See also ==
- List of Medal of Honor recipients
- List of Medal of Honor recipients for the Indian Wars
