= Frederick W. Gerber =

United States Army Medal of Honor recipient (1813–1875)

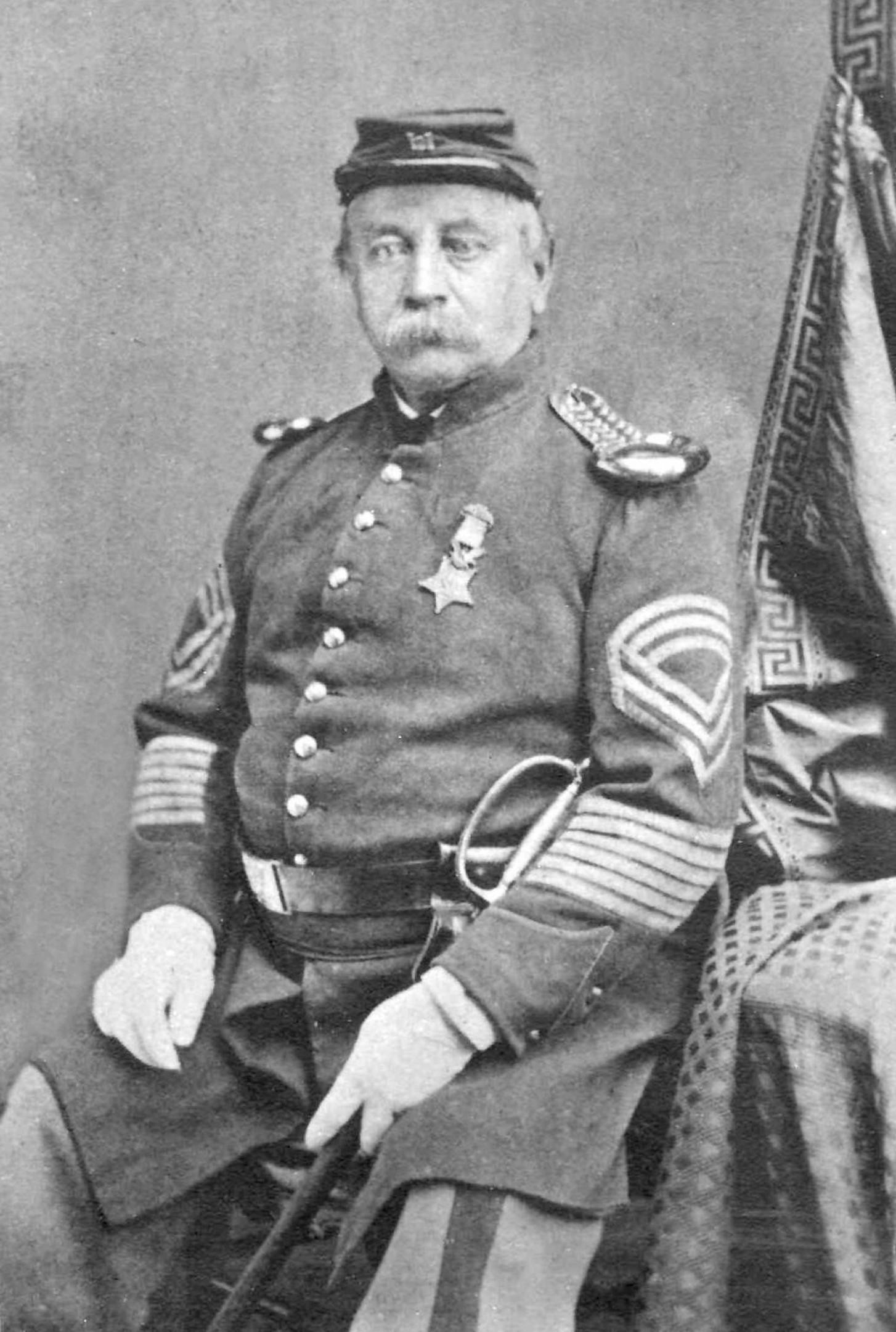
Gerber with his Medal of Honor

Frederick William Gerber (1813 – November 10, 1875) was a German-American soldier who received the Medal of Honor for his 32 years of service in the US Army. He is one of only two people (the other being Major General Adolphus Greely) who received the Medal of Honor for his entire career rather than a single action. He was born in Dresden, Kingdom of Saxony.

Gerber immigrated to the United States in the 1830s and enlisted with the 4th US Infantry in February 1839, leaving the army a first time in February 1844. He joined the 1st Engineer Battalion when it was created in 1846 and served in the Mexican–American War. During the Battle of Mexico City, he is said to have saved the life of then second lieutenant George B. McClellan.

During the American Civil War, Gerber was responsible for training volunteer recruits into combat engineers. In September 1864, he was promoted to sergeant major, becoming the senior enlisted soldier in the Corps of Engineers and the first person to hold that rank in the Corps of Engineers. He was appointed adjutant of the Corps of Engineers in February 1867. He was offered a commission on several occasions, but declined each time.

On the 8th of November 1871, during his 7th re-enlistment, Gerber was awarded the Medal of Honor for his entire career. He was the first enlisted US Army engineer to receive the medal. Gerber died in 1875 from asthma while serving at the Engineer School at Camp Morgan at Willets Point, Queens (now known as Fort Totten). He is buried in Cypress Hills National Cemetery (MH) (2-6101) in Brooklyn, New York along with several other Medal of Honor recipients.

== Medal of Honor citation ==
Rank and unit/command: Sergeant Major, U.S. Engineers

Place and date: 1839-1871

Entered service at: Brooklyn, Kings County, New York

Birth: Dresden, Germany

Date of issue: November 8, 1871

Distinguished gallantry in many actions and in recognition of long, faithful, and meritorious services covering a period of 32 years.
