= Wilbur E. Colyer =

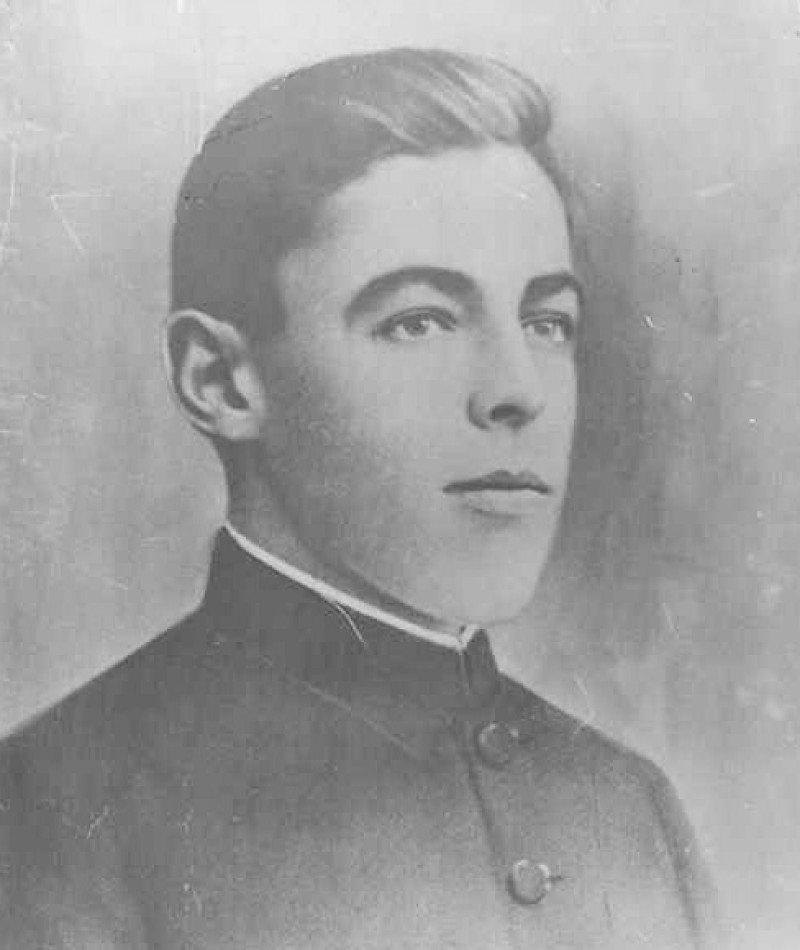
- Born: March 5, 1898; Brooklyn, New York, US
- Died: October 10, 1918 (aged 20) near Verdun, France
- Burial place: Cypress Hills National Cemetery, Brooklyn, New York
- Military career
- Allegiance: United States of America
- Branch: United States Army
- Service years: 1917 - 1918
- Rank: Sergeant
- Units: Company A, 1st Engineer Regiment, 1st Infantry Division
- Conflicts: World War I
- Awards: Medal of Honor

Wilbur E. Colyer (March 5, 1898 – October 10, 1918) was an American soldier serving in the U.S. Army during World War I who received the Medal of Honor for bravery.

== Biography ==
Colyer was born March 5, 1898, in Brooklyn, New York and after enlisting in the Army in 1917 was sent to France to fight in World War I. He died October 10, 1918, and is buried in Cypress Hills National Cemetery, Brooklyn, New York.

== Medal of Honor citation ==
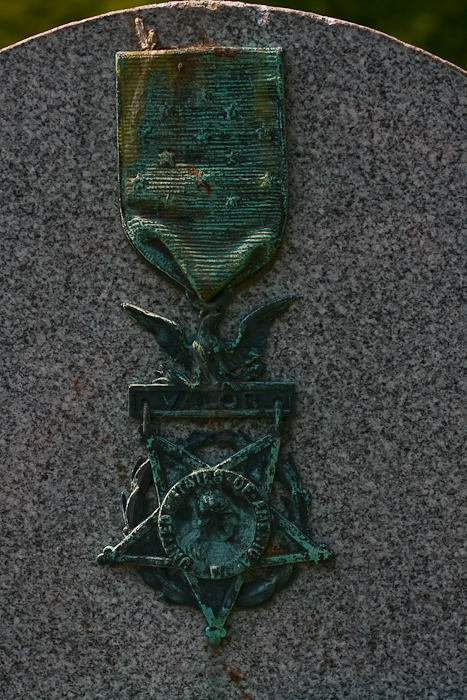
Detail of Colyer's gravestone at Cypress Hills National Cemetery

Rank and organization: Sergeant, U.S. Army, Company A, 1st Engineers, 1st Division. Place and date: Near Verdun, France, 9 October 1918. Entered service at: South Ozone Park, Long Island, N.Y. Birth: Brooklyn, N.Y. General Orders: War Department, General Orders No. 20 (January 30, 1919).

Citation:

Volunteering with 2 other soldiers to locate machinegun nests, Sgt. Colyer advanced on the hostile positions to a point where he was half surrounded by the nests, which were in ambush. He killed the gunner of one gun with a captured German grenade and then turned this gun on the other nests silencing all of them before he returned to his platoon. He was later killed in action.

== Remembrance ==
On October 9, 2013, the 1st Engineer Battalion hosted a "mud run," modeled after the popular Tough Mudder, that included ruck marching, an obstacle course, and a crawl through a muddy pit. The course was named the "SGT Wilbur E. Colyer Diehard Challenge" in memory of SGT Colyer.

== Military awards ==
Colyer's military decorations and awards include:

1st row	Medal of Honor	World War I Victory Medal w/one silver service star to denote credit for the Montdidier-Noyon, Aisne-Marne, St. Mihiel, Meuse-Argonne and Defensive Sector battle clasps.
Unit Award	French Fourragère - Authorized permanent wear based on two French Croix de Guerre with Palm unit citations awarded the 1st Engineer Battalion for Lorraine-Picardy and Aisne-Marne/Meuse-Argonne	

== See also ==
- List of Medal of Honor recipients for World War I
