= Valentine Rossbach =

American Civil War Medal of Honor recipient

- Born: 1842; Germany
- Died: February 20, 1897; Flushing, New York, US
- Military career
- Allegiance: United States: Union
- Branch: Union Army
- Rank: Sergeant
- Unit: 34th New York Battery
- Conflicts: American Civil War: Battle of Spotsylvania Court House
- Awards: Medal of Honor

Valentine Rossbach (or Rossback) (1842 – February 20, 1897) was a German-American soldier and member of the 34th New York Battery who fought in the American Civil War and was awarded the Medal of Honor for services in the Battle of Spotsylvania Court House.

== Biography ==
Valentine Rossbach was born in 1842 in Germany.

He enlisted in the 34th New York Battery during the American Civil War.

He received the Medal of Honor for heroism at the Battle of Spotsylvania Court House on May 12, 1864.

His Medal of Honor citation reads as follows:

for extraordinary heroism on 12 May 1864, while serving with 34th New York Battery, in action at Spotsylvania, Virginia. Sergeant Rossbach encouraged his cannoneers to hold a very dangerous position, and when all depended on several good shots it was from his piece that the most effective were delivered, causing the enemy's fire to cease and thereby relieving the critical position of the Federal troops.

== Death and burial ==
Sergeant Rossbach died on February 20, 1897 (aged about 54 or 55) in Flushing, New York. He was interred at Cypress Hills National Cemetery.
