= 1st Engineer Battalion =

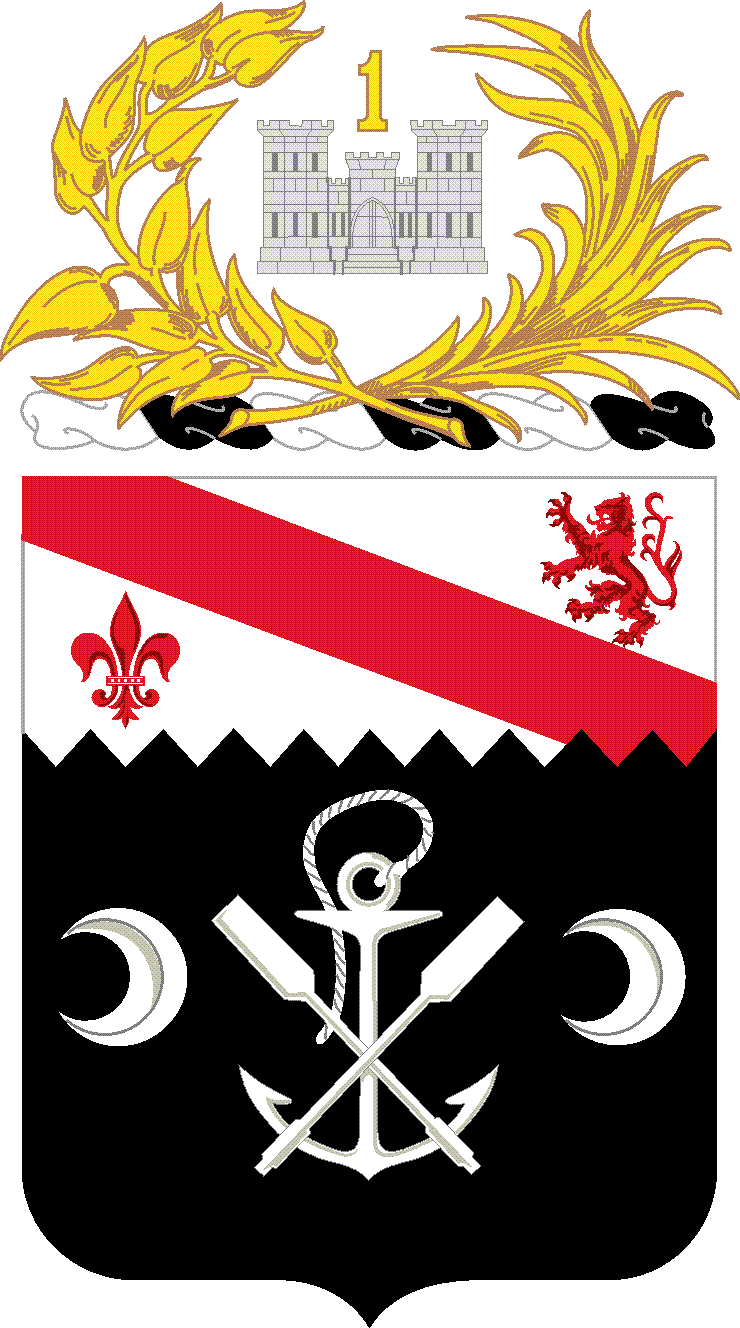
- Coat of arms
- Active: 1846–present
- Country: United States
- Branch: Army
- Type: Engineer
- Part of: 1st Infantry Division
- Garrison/HQ: Fort Riley, Kansas
- Nickname: "Diehard"
- Motto: Always First
- Engagements: Mexican–American War; American Civil War; Spanish–American War; World War I World War II; Vietnam War; Operation Desert Shield; Operation Desert Storm; Operation Iraqi Freedom; Operation Enduring Freedom
- Decorations: Presidential Unit Citation (3); Joint Meritorious Unit Award; Valorous Unit Citation (3); Meritorious Unit Commendation (6); Superior Unit Award; French Croix de Guerre with palm (4); French Médaille militaire

Commanders
- Commanding officer: LTC Robert (Bobby) B. Howell
- Command Sergeant Major: CSM Megan Payton
- Notable commanders: Gustavus W. Smith George B. McClellan; George W. Cullum; Ulysses S. Grant III; Thomas P. Bostick; Robert F. Whittle Kirk E. Gibbs

Insignia
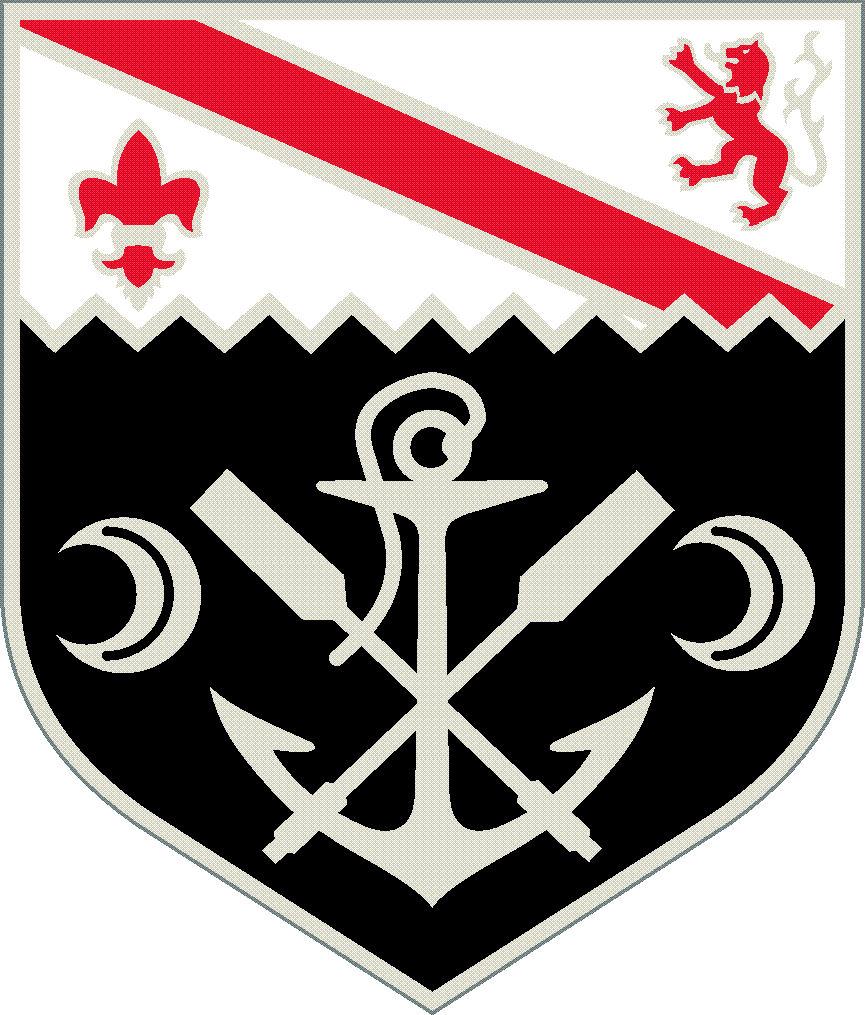
- Distinctive unit insignia

The 1st Engineer Battalion is a combat engineer unit of the United States Army that provides sustained engineer support across the full spectrum of military operations. The 1st Engineer Battalion is the oldest and most decorated engineer battalion in the US Army, tracing its lineage to the original Company of Sappers and Miners organized at West Point, New York in 1846.

The battalion nickname is "Diehard".

== Current units ==
- Headquarters and Headquarters Company (HHC)
- 41st Combat Engineer Company
- 232nd Combat Engineer Company
- 595th Combat Engineer Company
- FSC Company (Forward Support Company)

== Attached units ==
None

== Transformation ==
With the Army Structure (ARSTRUC) announcement, 1st Engineer Battalion re-aligned into the brigade engineer battalion formation while retaining its heraldry and name, aligned under the 1st Armor Brigade Combat Team, 1st Infantry Division. To accomplish this, 72nd MAC inactivated in September 2014 and 41st Clearance Company became an echelons above brigade asset in October 2014. In addition, the battalion reflagged 111th Sapper Company to their historic roots as A/1st EN and welcomed three new companies (formerly of the 1st Brigade Special Troops Battalion):

- A/1-1 BSTB (MICO) became D/1st EN
- B/1-1 BSTB (Signal) became C/1st EN
- C/1-1 BSTB (Combat Engineer Mechanized) became B/1st EN

== Unit history ==
=== Origins and the Mexican–American War ===
The battalion's history can be traced back to 15 May 1846 when a company of miners, sappers, and pontoniers was formed at West Point, New York. Alpha Company, 1st Engineer Battalion is that company's direct descendant. The battalion has received 67 decorations and campaign streamers and eight foreign awards. Company A served during the Mexican–American War of 1846, participating in the Veracruz campaign and charging up the heights of Chapultepec in Mexico City.

During the war, three future Civil War generals, among them George McClellan and P.G.T. Beauregard served as lieutenants in Alpha Company, and the company worked closely with then-Captain Robert E. Lee, an engineer aide to General Winfield Scott.

=== The American Civil War ===
With initiation of hostilities, the company was expanded into the "Battalion of Engineer Troops". On 31 December 1861, the battalion was officially designated as "The United States Engineer Battalion", and was assigned to the Engineer Brigade of the Union Army of the Potomac through the remainder of the war. The battalion earned ten campaign streamers. The battalion fought at Antietam, bridged the Rappahannock River six times at Fredericksburg, breached fortifications at Petersburg and was present at the surrender of General Lee at Appomattox. The first Company C was attritted during the Civil War. In 1865, Company E was redesignated Company C, replacing it.

Following the cessation of hostilities, on 1 July 1866, The United States Engineer Battalion was redesignated the "1st Battalion of Engineers".

The battalion's first sergeant major, Frederick W. Gerber, was awarded the Medal of Honor for his 25 years of service to the battalion, which included the Mexican–American War and the American Civil War.

=== The Spanish–American War ===
During the Spanish–American War, Company C and Company E of the battalion were sent to Cuba where they fought in the campaign to take the city of Santiago. The remainder of the battalion was sent to the Philippines where they provided engineer support during the battles for Manila and Cavite. Alpha Company remained in the Philippines and conducted pacification operations during the Philippine Insurrection.

=== World War I ===
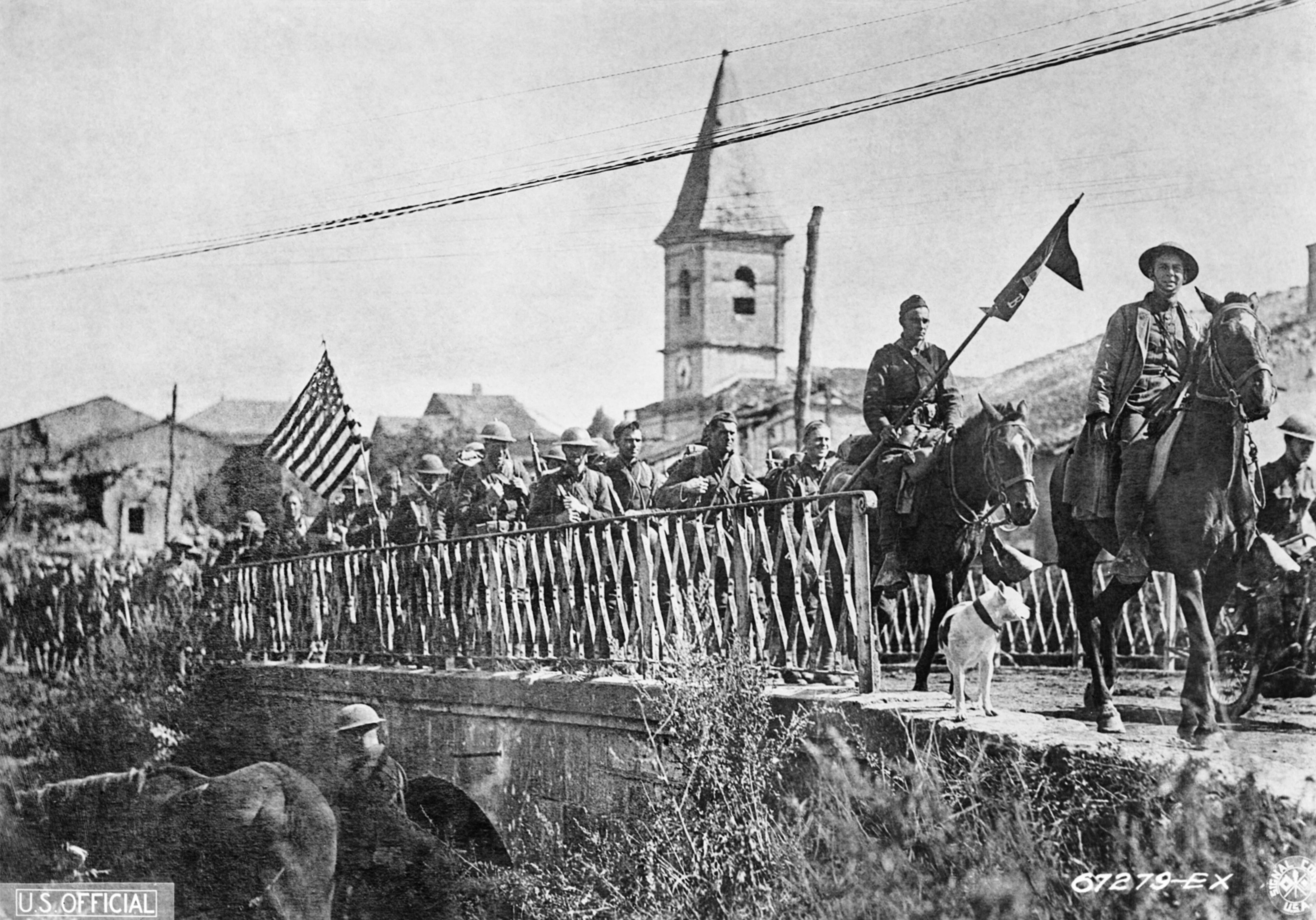
Returning from the Front. Company B, 1st Engineers, 1st Division. Colors flying, entering shell-torn town on return from their job on the firing line, 13 September 1918.

On 1 July 1916, the 1st Battalion of Engineers was redesignated the "1st Engineer Battalion". With the American entry into World War I, the battalion was expanded on 15 May 1917 to become the 1st Engineer Regiment, composed of six companies, and assigned to the 1st Infantry Division. As part of this expansion, Company C and Company D were reorganized to form the 6th Engineer Battalion the same day. A new Company C (the third company to bear the name), was formed to replace the company reorganized as part of the 6th Engineers.

The regiment fought as part of the "Big Red One" and participated in the Lorraine and Meuse-Argonne campaigns and was awarded the French Fourragère and two awards of the Croix de Guerre for valorous service. Sergeant Wilbur E. Colyer of Company A received the Medal of Honor for advancing under fire and destroying a series of enemy machine gun positions near Verdun, France, in 1918.

=== Between the wars ===
The regiment arrived at the port of New York 3 September 1919 on the USS Orizaba, and was transferred 4 October 1919 to Camp Zachary Taylor, Kentucky. It was transferred again on 16 September 1920 in a permanent change of station to Camp Dix, New Jersey. Transferred in September 1922 to Fort DuPont, Delaware. Company D constructed a 368-foot pontoon bridge across the Winooski River at Burlington Vermont, in November 1927 to replace a bridge washed out during the heavy floods that fall. The company remained on duty to maintain the bridge until October 1928. Company A (commanded by First Lieutenant Leslie R. Groves) was attached to the 29th Engineer Battalion (Topographic) 15 October 1929-25 July 1931 and conducted surveys in Nicaragua for possible canal routes across Central America. In April 1933, the regiment assumed command and control of the Delaware Civilian Conservation Corps (CCC) District. In 1931 and 1933 the unit was responsible for floating six sets of officer quarters from Fort Mott in Pennsville, New Jersey, just across the Delaware River. The regiment undertook a construction and renovation project from February to November 1934 at Camp Dix to improve roads, build artillery shelters, and construct vehicle maintenance buildings. Other projects included four identical sets of brick duplexes and a 398-seat movie theatre, all of which still stand today. From 1934 to 1936, the unit was commanded by Colonel Ulysses S. Grant III, a grandson of the former general and president. The regiment assisted in the summer training of Organized Reserve engineer units of the First, Second, and Third Corps Areas at Fort DuPont 1922-39. On 9 October 1939, the 2nd Battalion was redesignated as the 27th Engineer Battalion (Combat) and relieved from the 1st Division, while the 1st Battalion was redesignated on 12 October 1939 as the 1st Engineer Battalion (Combat); the regiment, less the 1st and 2nd Battalions, was disbanded on 16 October 1939.

=== World War II ===
Prior to the start of World War II, the 1st Engineer Regiment was reorganized as the "1st Engineer Combat Battalion" and again assigned to fight as part of the 1st Infantry Division. In October 1939, the 1st Engineer Regiment was reorganized, separating into two battalions. Companies A, B and C formed the 1st Engineer Battalion and Companies D, E and F formed the 27th Engineer Battalion.

In 1942, the battalion was redesignated the "1st Engineer Combat Battalion" and landed with the initial forces in the North Africa invasion. In 1943, the battalion cleared underwater obstacles and destroyed enemy pillboxes during the landings on Sicily. During the Normandy landings at Omaha Beach in 1944, the battalion led the assault forces, breaching gaps in the extensive enemy mine and wire obstacles and clearing the combat trails leading off the beaches.

The battalion received the Presidential Unit Citation for actions at Gafsa, at Tunisia, Omaha Beach, and the Croix de guerre 1939-1945 with palm for its actions in the Kasserine and Normandy as part of the 1st Infantry Division. The battalion was awarded the Fourragère cited at the orders of the Médaille militaire for four citations at the orders of the armed forces. The battalion fought as part of the 1st Infantry Division during the remainder of the war in the European Theater and after 10 years of occupation duty moved to Fort Riley, Kansas.

In 1953, the 1st Engineer Combat Battalion was redesignated the "1st Engineer Battalion (Combat)", continuing to support the 1st Infantry Division.

=== Vietnam War ===
On 2 May 1965 the battalion, under the command of Lieutenant Colonel Howard L. Sargent, Jr., deployed to South Vietnam as part of the 1st Infantry Division. For five years the battalion cleared obstacles, built roads, airfields, basecamps and bridges in support of numerous combat operations including Junction City I and II and the Tet Offensive of 1968. The battalion's DieHard Tunnel Rat section cleared the extensive Vietcong tunnel systems with little more than small arms and demolitions. The battalion received four Meritorious Unit Commendations for actions during the Vietnam War.

Some time following its return to Ft. Riley, the battalion was reorganized as a mechanized engineer battalion, composed of one headquarters company ("HHC"), four line companies (A-D) and an assault float ribbon bridge company (E Company).

During the next 20 years at Fort Riley, the battalion took part in numerous training exercises, National Training Center (NTC) rotations in the Mojave Desert, and REFORGER deployments to and from West Germany. During this period, Company D, 1st Engineers, was detached and stationed in northern Germany as part of a forward-deployed combat brigade of the 1st Infantry Division known as 1st Infantry Division (Forward), or "1st IDF".

=== Desert Shield and Desert Storm ===
Following the invasion of Kuwait by the military forces of Iraq, the battalion deployed with the 1st Infantry Division to Southwest Asia in support of Operations Desert Shield and Desert Storm in December 1990, under the command of Lieutenant Colonel Steven R. Hawkins (later Brigadier General). The battalion supported the destruction of the Republican Guard Division "Hammurabi".

Equipped with M113 Armored Personnel Carriers, Mine Clearing Line Charges and M728 Combat Engineer Vehicles, the battalion breached and cleared lanes through Iraqi obstacle belts that allowed the passage of two divisions including the British "1st Armoured Division". Elements of the battalion destroyed 58 Iraqi tanks, 41 anti-aircraft artillery pieces, and other large quantities of ammunition and war material. The battalion was one of the first operators of the new M9 Armored Combat Earthmover, a critical obstacle breaching asset.

The battalion returned to Fort Riley in 1991, receiving the Valorous Unit Citation for actions in Southwest Asia.

=== Post-Desert Storm reorganization ===
In 1992, engineer battalions across the Army were significantly reorganized. Known as the Engineer Restructure Initiative ("ERI"), under this new organization, the 1st Engineer Battalion, under the command of Lieutenant Colonel (later Brigadier General) Joseph Schroedel, was separated into three distinct organizations.

The first organization, composed of Company A, Company B, and a portion of the 1st Engineers' headquarters remained as the 1st Engineer Battalion.

The second organization, composed of Company C, Company E, and a second portion of the battalion headquarters formed the nucleus of the reactivated 70th Engineer Battalion (Mechanized), whose nickname is "Kodiaks". Company C, 1st Engineers "Charlie Rock", under the command of Captain (later Lieutenant Colonel) Joseph Gandara, became Company C, 70th Engineer Battalion. Company E, an assault float ribbon bridge company at the time equipped with powerful bridge erection boats, float bridge bays and trucks, was reorganized and re-equipped as a mechanized engineer company becoming Company A, 70th Engineer Battalion, under the command of Captain (later Colonel) Vance F. Stewart. A new Company B, 70th Engineers was formed from new personnel and equipment.

To replace the Company C that moved to the 70th Engineers, a new Company C, 1st Engineers was organized, the fourth company to hold the name. A platoon each from Company A, 1st Engineers and Company B, 1st Engineers, were combined to form the new Company C under the command of Captain (later Lieutenant Colonel) Stephen C. Larsen with First Sergeant Mark D. Burrell. Since the new Company C, adopting the nickname "Cold Steel", was composed of elements of the original Companies A and B, it carries forth the old lineage of the battalion and is therefore, like Companies A and B, a direct descendant of the oldest combat engineer organization of the US Army. Six months and two-month-long National Training Center rotations after its organization, Company C was awarded the prestigious 1st Infantry Division Company of the Quarter Award.

Company D, 1st Engineers, detached from the battalion and serving as part of a combat brigade of the 1st Infantry Division in northern Germany (the 1st Infantry Division (Forward)), was inactivated.

The third organization was composed of the remainder of the battalion headquarters and became the newly activated Division Engineer Brigade headquarters under the command of Colonel Henry "Chip" Leonard.

The 1st Engineer Battalion was assigned in direct support of the 1st Brigade, 1st Infantry Division while the 70th Engineer Battalion was assigned in direct support of the 2nd Brigade, 1st Infantry Division.

From 1994–1996, the battalion was commanded by then-Lieutenant Colonel Thomas P. Bostick, later to achieve the rank of lieutenant general (LTG) and serve as the chief of engineers, the commanding general of the US Army Corps of Engineers.

The battalion operations officer during ERI was then-major Todd T. Semonite, later to achieve the rank of lieutenant general, succeeding LTG Bostick as the chief of engineers.

Since 1992, the battalion participated in many National Training Center and Joint Readiness Training Center rotations, fought fires in the Northwestern United States, and supported anti-drug operations as part of JTF-6.

In 1995, the 1st Engineer Battalion was awarded the Army Superior Unit Award for performance during the Engineer Restructuring Initiative on Fort Riley.

=== Bosnia and Herzegovina ===
On 30 August 1999 the battalion deployed to Bosnia and Herzegovina in support of SFOR. Units redeploying on 12 December 1999, the battalion helped provide a stable and secure environment in the area. To this end, the battalion conducted reconnaissance of over 1,230 kilometers of routes and 298 bridges; destroyed 116,000 anti-personnel land mines; constructed 30 kilometers of roads and 5 bridges; supervised Entity Armed Forces' clearance of more than 43,000 square miles (110,000 km^{2}) of minefields; and distributed toys, clothing, and humanitarian aid to Bosnian children and homeless families. Upon completing their task the unit received the NATO Ribbon as well as the Armed Forces Expeditionary Medal.

=== Global war on terror ===
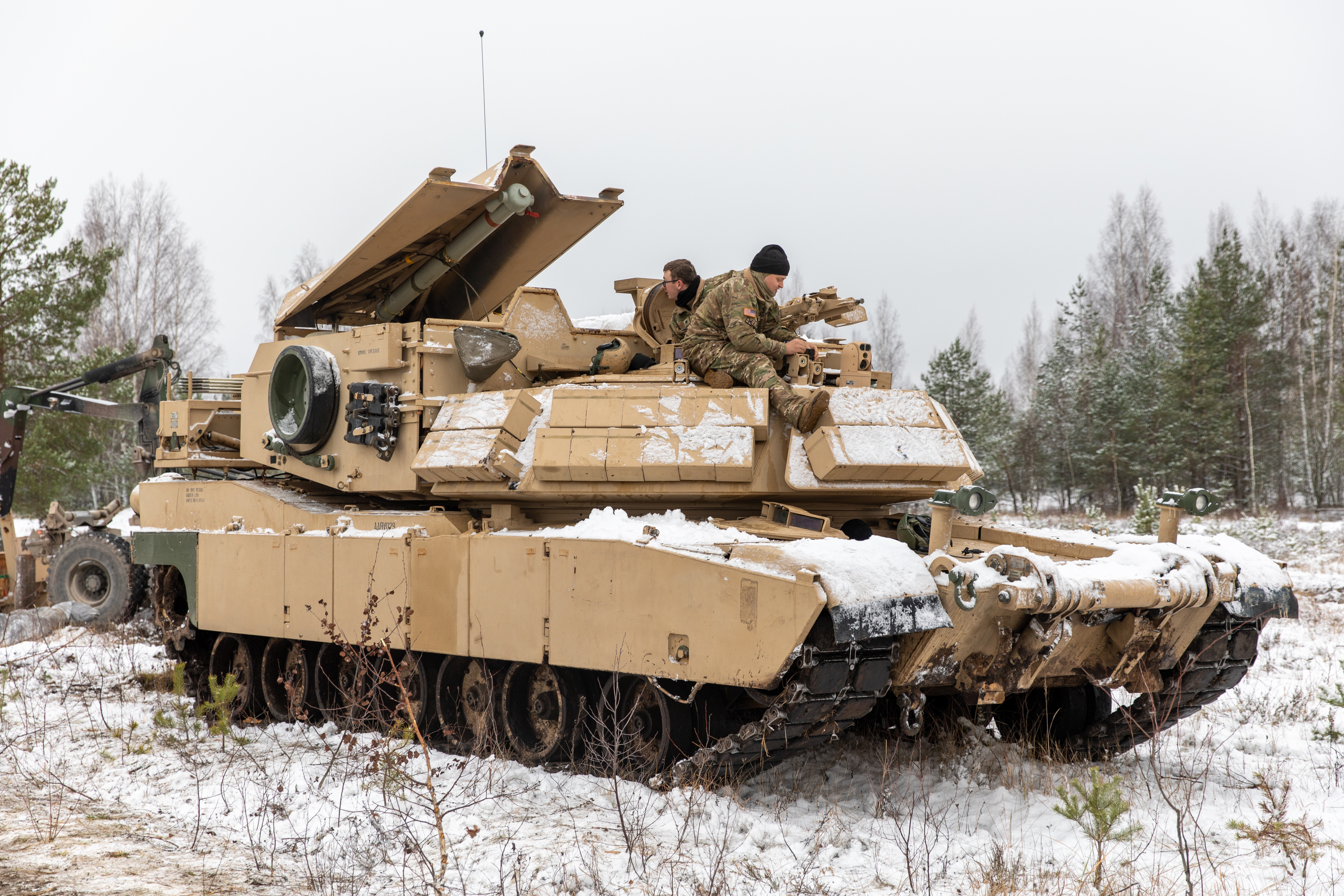
Soldiers with 1st Brigade Engineer Battalion "Diehard" prepare a Mine-Clearing Line Charge for an explosive breach exercise during Winter Shield 2021 at Camp Ādaži, Latvia, Nov. 28, 2021.

On 8 September 2003, the 1st Engineer Battalion deployed to Iraq as part of the 1st Brigade, 1st Infantry Division for Operation Iraqi Freedom. In one year the battalion exploited over 370 enemy caches consisting of 28 tons of munitions and weapons, found and destroyed over 150 improvised devices, fortified 21 government buildings and coalition camps in the Al Anbar Province, cleared several hundred kilometers of roads, supported six battalions in the Ar Ramadi and Habbaniyah areas with combat engineer operations for six other camps in the Ar Ramadi area. The battalion returned to Fort Riley in October 2004. For actions in Al Anbar, the battalion earned a second Valorous Unit Award.

The battalion restructured its companies in 2006 as part of the Corps of Engineers restructuring plan for engineer forces Army-wide. A part of this restructuring made the battalion a separate, echelon above brigade unit and assigned training and readiness authority to the 555th Engineer Brigade and briefly to the 36th Engineer Brigade.

The battalion deployed to Iraq again in the fall of 2006 for a 15-month deployment, conducting route clearance operations in Multinational Division-North. Working as Task Force Trailblazer, the battalion earned a third Valorous Unit Award for combat action.

In July 2009 the 41st Clearance Company deployed to the RC-East Area of Operations in Afghanistan as a part of Operation Enduring Freedom. The company headquarters was located at FOB Fenty, with the four clearance platoons separated, relocating numerous times, to provide route clearance assets for three separate brigade combat teams and the Polish Battle Group. The 41st CC redeployed in July 2010.

In November 2009 the 1st Engineer Battalion deployed in support of OIF IX-X. The 1st Engineer Battalion(-), composed of HHC, FSC, 111th Sapper Company, and 72nd Mobility Augmentation Company, conducted engineer operations in United States Division - North (USD-N) in support of Operation Iraqi Freedom. The 573rd Clearance Company out of White Sands Missile Range, NM was modularly deployed and assigned to the 1st Engineer Battalion(-) to round out the battalion's clearance capabilities. The battalion conducted route clearance along assigned division routes while concurrently partnering with the 4th and 12th Iraqi Army Field Engineer Regiments in a modified advise and assist role in order to help these FERs become mission capable. HHC, FSC, and 111th redeployed in July 2010. The 72nd MAC remained in Iraq until their redeployment in November 2010. For actions in Iraq, the battalion was awarded its fifth Meritorious Unit Citation.

In September 2012, the battalion deployed to Regional Command-East, Afghanistan. Once deployed, the 72d MAC and the 111th Sapper Companies were task organized to the 178th En Bn (SCANG) to provide route clearance in Paktiya and Paktika Provinces, while the 41st CC remained in the north with the battalion as Task Force Diehard. As Task Force Diehard, headquartered at FOB Shank, the battalion assumed control of all mobility, counter-mobility, survivability, general engineering, and engineer partnerships in the Logar, Wardak, Nangahar, Kunar, Laghman and Kapisa Provinces. Over the nine-month deployment, the battalion assumed responsibility for all engineer operations in RC-East; thus adding Kabul, Paktika, Paktiya, and Ghazni Provinces. By April 2013, the task force had 1,100 soldiers with six combat engineer and two construction companies. The battalion returned to Fort Riley in June 2013. For actions in Afghanistan, the battalion was awarded a sixth Meritorious Unit Citation.

In November 2013, after 2162 days, the battalion was again reassigned back to the 1st Infantry Division.

The battalion reorganized in October 2014 as a brigade engineer battalion under Devil Brigade, 1st Infantry Division.

=== Korea ===
In October 2016, the battalion marked its first visit to the Korean Peninsula with a deployment to Camp Hovey, South Korea with the 1st Brigade, 1st Infantry Division. The deployment was part of an HQDA initiated Armored Brigade Combat Team (ABCT) rotation of forces to the Republic of Korea (ROK) in support of national level and theater specific requirements. The mission of the Diehard Battalion was to enable 1ABCT to deter North Korean aggression and maintain peace on the Korean Peninsula; and, if deterrence failed, enable the Devil Brigade to "Fight Tonight" in support of the US-ROK Alliance. For nine months, the Diehard Battalion supported national interests in the Korean Theater of Operations by preparing for non-combatant evacuation operations (NEO), counter weapons of mass destruction (CWMD) operations, relocating elements of the battalion from Area I into Area III, and integrating enablers in support of the brigade. The battalion redeployed to Ft Riley, Kansas in June 2017.

=== Europe ===
In January 2019, the battalion deployed with the 1st Brigade, 1st Infantry Division, to Europe in support of Operation Atlantic Resolve. The deployment supported deterrence operations in US Army EUCOM, as well as facilitating multiple multinational training events, including Allied Spirit X and Combined Resolve XII at the Joint Multinational Readiness Center (JMRC). Engineers of the 1st Engineer Battalion deployed to multiple locations across the continent, including Germany, Poland, Romania, and Bulgaria. The battalion redeployed to Ft Riley, Kansas in September 2019.

== Awards and decorations ==
=== Campaign credit ===
Conflict	Streamer	Year(s)
Mexican War - A Company	Vera Cruz 1847	9–29 March 1847
Mexican War - A Company	Cerro Gordo 1847	17 April 1847
Mexican War - A Company	Contreras 1847	18–20 August 1847
Mexican War - A Company	Churubusco 1847	20 August 1847
Mexican War - A Company	Molino del Rey 1847	8 September 1847
Mexican War - A Company	Chapultepec 1847	13 September 1847
Civil War	Peninsula 1862	1862
Civil War	Antietam 1862	1862
Civil War	Fredericksburg 1862	1862
Civil War	Chancellorsville 1863	1863
Civil War	Wilderness 1864	1864
Civil War	Spotsylvania 1864	1864
Civil War	Cold Harbor 1864	1864
Civil War	Petersburg 1864-1865	1864-1865
Civil War	Appomattox 1865	1865
War With Spain	Manila 1898	1898
Philippine Insurrection	Manila 1899	1899
Philippine Insurrection	Cavite 1899-1900	1899-1900
Philippine Insurrection	Tarlac 1899	1899
World War I	Montdidier-Noyon 1918	1918
World War I	Aisne-Marne 1918	1918
World War I	St. Mihiel 1918	1918
World War I	Meuse-Argonne 1918	1918
World War I	Lorraine 1918	1918
World War I	Picardy 1918	1918
World War II	Algeria-French Morocco 1942 (with arrowhead)	1942
World War II	Tunisia 1942	1942
World War II	Sicily 1943 (with arrowhead)	1943
World War II	Normandy 1944 (with arrowhead)	1944
World War II	Northern France 1944	1944
World War II	Rhineland 1944-1945	1944-1945
World War II	Ardennes-Alsace 1944-1945	1944-1945
World War II	Central Europe 1945	1945
Vietnam War	Defense	1965
Vietnam War	Counteroffensive	1965–1966
Vietnam War	Counteroffensive, Phase II	1966–1967
Vietnam War	Counteroffensive, Phase III	1967–1968
Vietnam War	Tet Counteroffensive	1968
Vietnam War	Counteroffensive, Phase IV	1968
Vietnam War	Counteroffensive, Phase V	1968
Vietnam War	Counteroffensive, Phase VI	1968–1969
Vietnam War	Tet 69/Counteroffensive	1969
Vietnam War	Summer-Fall 1969	1969
Vietnam War	Winter-Spring 1970	1969–1970
Gulf War	Defense of Saudi Arabia	1990-1991
Gulf War	Liberation and Defense of Kuwait	1991
Gulf War	Ceasefire	1991
Global War On Terrorism	Global War on Terrorism	2001-Current
Operation Iraqi Freedom	Iraqi Governance	2004
Operation Iraqi Freedom	National Resolution	2005
Operation Iraqi Freedom	Iraqi Surge	2007
Operation Iraqi Freedom	Iraqi Sovereignty	2009
Operation Iraqi Freedom	New Dawn	2010
Operation Enduring Freedom	Transition I	2011–2012

=== Unit decorations ===
Ribbon	Award	Year	Notes
	Presidential Unit Citation (Army)		GAFSA
	Presidential Unit Citation (Army)		TUNISIA
	Presidential Unit Citation (Army)		NORMANDY
	Valorous Unit Award		IRAQ-KUWAIT 1991
	Valorous Unit Award		AL-ANBAR PROVINCE
	Valorous Unit Award		IRAQ 2006-2007
	Meritorious Unit Commendation (Army)		VIETNAM 1966
	Meritorious Unit Commendation (Army)		VIETNAM 1966-1967
	Meritorious Unit Commendation (Army)		VIETNAM 1967-1968
	Meritorious Unit Commendation (Army)		VIETNAM 1968-1969
	Meritorious Unit Commendation (Army)		IRAQ 2009-2010
	Meritorious Unit Commendation (Army)		AFGHANISTAN 2012-2013
	Army Superior Unit Award (Army)		1992-1993
	French Croix de Guerre, with Palm		LORRAINE-PICARDY
	French Croix de Guerre, with Palm		AISNE-MARNE and MEUSE-ARGONNE
	French Croix de Guerre, with Palm		KASSERINE
	French Croix de Guerre, with Palm		NORMANDY
	French Médaille militaire		FRANCE
	French Médaille militaire, Fourragere		
	Belgian Fourragere	1940	
	Cited in the Order of the Day of the Belgian Army		For action at MONS
	Cited in the Order of the Day of the Belgian Army		For action at EUPEN-MALMEDY
	Republic of Vietnam Cross of Gallantry, with Palm	1965–1968	For service in Vietnam
	Republic of Vietnam Civil Action Unit Citation	1965–1970	For service in Vietnam
