= Mohammed Kahn =

Muslim American Civil War soldier (1823–1891)

- محمد خان
- Born: 1823; Tehran, Guarded Domains of Iran
- Died: 26 May 1891 (aged 67–68); Manhattan, New York, United States
- Military career
- Allegiance: United States
- Branch: Union Army
- Service years: 1861–1865
- Nickname: John Ammahaie
- Unit: 43rd New York Infantry Regiment
- Conflicts: American Civil War: Battle of Malvern Hill; Battle of Gettysburg; Battle of the Wilderness; Battle of Spotsylvania Court House; Battle of Monocacy

Mohammed Kahn (Pashto; محمد خان 1823 – 26 May 1891), also known by the alias that he was buried under, John Ammahaie, was an Afghan–American soldier in the American Civil War, who was enlisted as a private in the 43rd New York Infantry and fought at the Battle of Gettysburg. He was born in Persia (modern Iran) and raised in Afghanistan.

Kahn was admitted to the United States in 1861 and resided with his family in Boston, Massachusetts. On August 2, 1861, he enlisted in the Union Army after encouragement from some friends. Kahn served with the 43rd New York Infantry until July 1863, when he became separated from his unit after the Battle of Gettysburg. Suspected of being African-American because of his dark skin color, he was not allowed to rejoin his all-white unit and instead was attached to a work party of escaped slaves. Kahn eventually managed to rejoin his unit at Spotsylvania, Virginia and convince them that he was not a deserter prior to the Battle of the Wilderness in May 1864.

Kahn was wounded at the Battle of Malvern Hill; again at the Battle of the Wilderness; again at the Battle of Spotsylvania Court House; and again at the Battle of Monocacy in Frederick, Virginia. According to official records, he was first admitted to the District of Columbia General Hospital in Washington, D.C. In May 1864 he was transported to Philadelphia, where he received treatment at the Chestnut Hill Hospital, and in July of that year at nearby Mower General Hospital.

Kahn spent the rest of the war as a sharpshooter, and applied for an army pension which was approved in 1881. He was one of a small number of Muslims who had served in the American Civil War, and is known primarily from his pension application which is housed at the National Archives and Records Administration. His pension case made it to the U.S. Congress in 1884.

A civilian acquaintance of Kahn recalled that Kahn owned and would read aloud from the Quran. This Quran was most likely an Arabic copy acquired in Iran or Afghanistan, as Kahn could not read English.

Kahn died on May 26, 1891 and was interred at the Cypress Hills National Cemetery in Brooklyn, New York.

== See also ==
- Josiah Harlan
- 11th Pennsylvania Cavalry Regiment
- Pashtuns
- Afghan Americans
