= Robert Osborne Abbott =

American surgeon and medical director

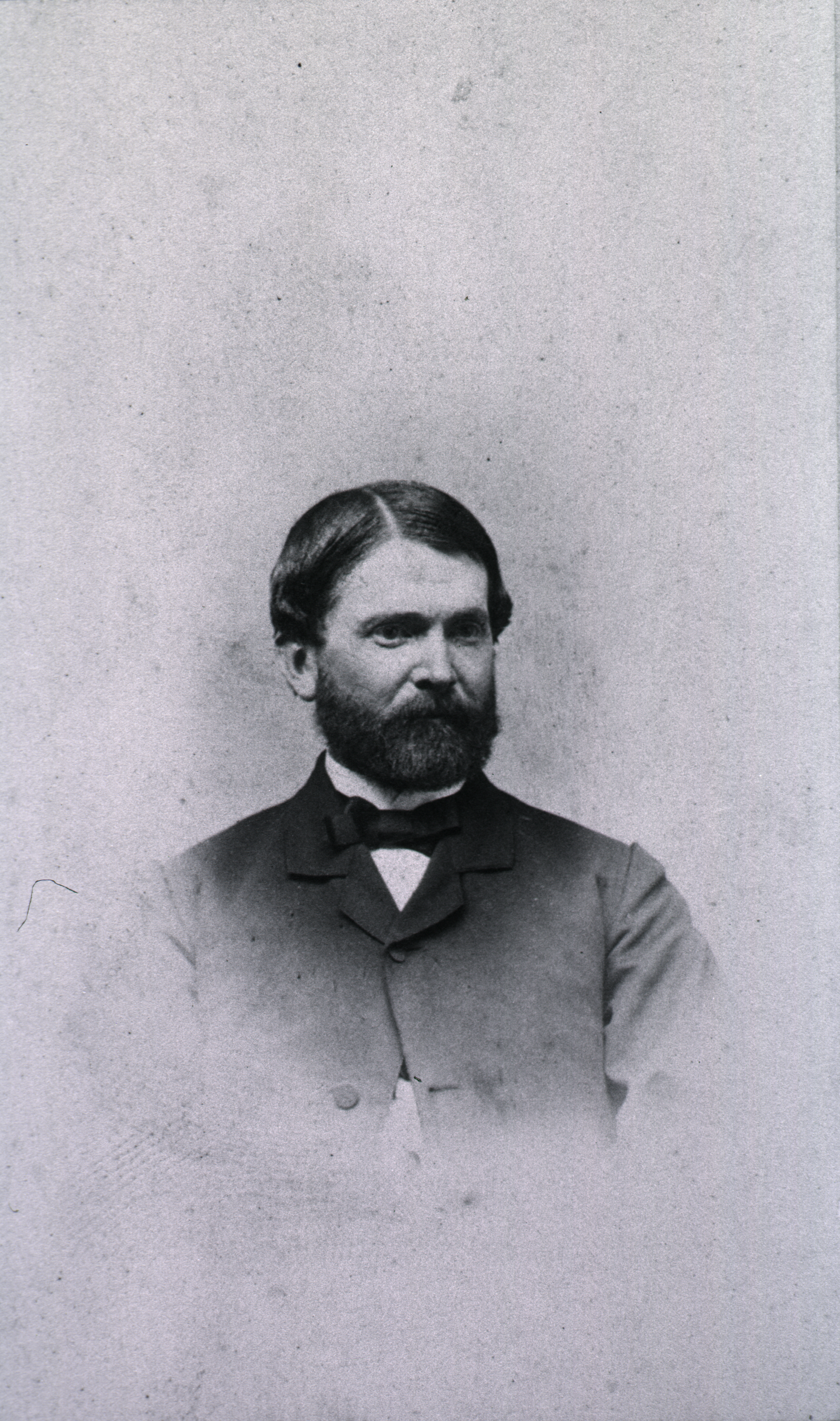
- Born: March 17, 1824; Pittsburgh
- Died: June 16, 1867 (aged 43); Brooklyn
- Occupation: Surgeon
- Branch: Union Army (1861–)

Robert Osborne Abbott (1824 – June 16, 1867) was an American surgeon and medical director of the Department of Washington during the American Civil War.

Robert Osborne Abbott was born in 1824 in Pennsylvania. He entered the United States Army in 1849 as assistant surgeon, and in that capacity accompanied John B. Magruder's battery to California. He subsequently served in the East, and also in Florida and Texas. During 1861 he was assistant to the chief medical purveyor in New York. In 1862 he was made medical director of the Fifth Army Corps, and later in the same year was appointed medical director of the Department of Washington, having charge of all the hospitals in and about the capital, together with all the hospital transports. He was present at the bedside of the dying President Abraham Lincoln after the president was shot at Ford's Theater in April 1865. The incessant and arduous duties of this office, which he held until November, 1866, seriously impaired his health. A six months' sick-leave failed to restore it, and he died a victim of over-work. Abbott died on 16 June 1867 in Brooklyn. He is buried in Cypress Hills National Cemetery.
