= Eugene P. Smith =

United States Navy Medal of Honor recipient (1871–1918)

- Born: August 8, 1871; Quincy, Illinois, US
- Died: March 24, 1918 (aged 46); Brooklyn Naval Hospital, New York, U.S.
- Military career
- Allegiance: United States
- Branch: United States Navy
- Rank: Chief Watertender
- Unit: USS Decatur (DD-5)
- Conflicts: World War I
- Awards: Medal of Honor

Eugene Patrick Smith (August 8, 1871 – March 24, 1918) was a United States Navy sailor and a recipient of the United States military's highest decoration, the Medal of Honor.

== Biography ==
Smith was born in Quincy, Illinois on August 8, 1871. He joined the Navy from California and by September 9, 1915, was serving as a Chief Watertender on the USS Decatur (DD-5). On that day, the Decatur suffered an explosion of unknown cause and four compartments, including the ship's magazine, were engulfed in flames. Despite heavy fumes of undetermined origin and the risk of further explosions, Smith and other sailors entered the compartments and rescued three gunner's mates. Smith was one of the first to enter the compartment in which the three men were trapped, and he returned "between five and eight times" while trying to locate them through the thick smoke. Finding one man, named Elkins, in the farthest corner of the chamber, Smith was partially overcome by the fumes and forced to retreat. After regaining his breath, he re-entered the compartment and saved Elkins. The commanding officer of the Decatur later stated that, of the crewmen, Smith "did most of all to save his shipmates." For these actions, he was awarded the Medal of Honor five months later, on February 8, 1916.

Smith reenlisted in the navy at San Francisco on February 15, 1916 and continued to serve during World War I. He died at the Brooklyn Naval Hospital on March 24, 1918 from lobar pneumonia, possibly related to the Spanish flu epidemic. Smith was interred at Cypress Hills National Cemetery.

== Medal of Honor citation ==
Smith's official Medal of Honor citation reads:

Attached to U.S.S. Decatur; for several times entering compartments on board of Decatur immediately following an explosion on board that vessel, 9 September 1915, and locating and rescuing injured shipmates.

== See also ==
- List of Medal of Honor recipients
