= Wilhelm Smith =

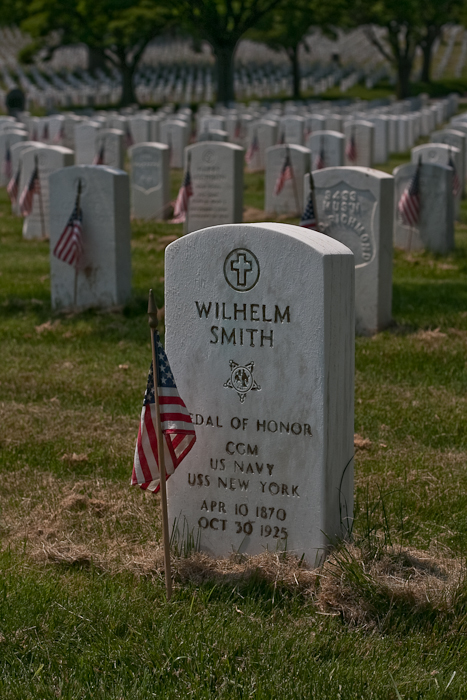
- Smith's grave marker
- Born: April 10, 1870; Germany
- Died: October 30, 1925 (aged 55)
- Military career
- Allegiance: United States
- Branch: United States Navy
- Rank: Chief Gunner's Mate
- Unit: USS New York (BB-34)
- Awards: Medal of Honor

Wilhelm Smith (April 10, 1870 – October 30, 1925) was a United States Navy sailor and a recipient of the United States military's highest decoration, the Medal of Honor.

== Biography ==
Born in Germany, Smith immigrated to the United States and joined the U.S. Navy from New York. By January 24, 1916, he was serving as a gunner's mate first class on the USS New York (BB-34).

On that day, a sanitary tank which collected runoff from the torpedo room, anchor chain locker, and anchor engine room was scheduled for a routine cleaning. The tank was inadequately ventilated, and the air inside was discovered to be too foul for men to enter. After allowing the empty tank to air out, the three-man cleaning crew was ordered to commence work. A hose was run to the tank from an ammunition handling room, of which Smith was in charge, and one sailor, Ordinary Seaman Peter J. Walsh, descended into the tank to begin cleaning. Walsh was quickly overcome by fumes and fell unconscious to the bottom of the chamber. His two companions rushed to the handling room where Smith was working and shut off the hose. While one of the men tried unsuccessfully to save Walsh, Smith gathered a rope and prepared to make his own rescue attempt.

Short and stocky, Smith struggled to fit his 192-pound (87 kg) frame through the small hatch into the tank. Making it through with great difficulty, he climbed to the bottom and tied the rope to Walsh's limp body. While ascending out of the tank, he too was overcome by the noxious gases and was pulled through the hatch unconscious by his fellow sailors. Both Smith and Walsh were taken to sick bay and resuscitated by use of a Pulmotor device. An officer on the New York stated that "Smith not only saved the life of Walsh, who could not have been resuscitated if he had been allowed to remain any longer, but he took a very great risk of not being able to get back himself through the manhole on account of his being so stout." For these actions, Smith was awarded the Medal of Honor three months later, on April 6.

Smith reached the rank of chief gunner's mate before leaving the Navy. He died at age 55.

== Medal of Honor citation ==
Smith's official Medal of Honor citation reads:

On board the U.S.S. New York, for entering a compartment filled with gases and rescuing a shipmate on 24 January

== See also ==
- List of Medal of Honor recipients
