= Peter Stewart (Medal of Honor) =

United States Marine Corps Medal of Honor recipient

- Medal of Honor recipient
- Born: February 17, 1858; Airdrie, North Lanarkshire, Scotland
- Died: June 17, 1914 (aged 56); Manhattan, New York City, New York
- Burial place: Cypress Hills National Cemetery, Brooklyn, New York
- Military career
- Allegiance: United States of America
- Branch: United States Marine Corps
- Service years: 1883 - 1909
- Rank: Gunnery Sergeant
- Conflicts: Boxer Rebellion
- Awards: Medal of Honor

Gunnery Sergeant Peter Stewart (February 17, 1858 – June 17, 1914) was a member of the United States Marine Corps and a recipient of the Medal of Honor.

He was one a group of U.S. sailors and Marines dispatched to guard the United States legation in Beijing during the Boxer Rebellion, and was awarded the medal for his extreme gallantry in four separate actions during June 1900.

Stewart died on June 17, 1914 in Manhattan, New York City. He was buried at the Cypress Hills National Cemetery in Brooklyn, New York, Section 2, Grave 7303.

== Medal of Honor citation ==
Rank and organization: Gunnery Sergeant, U.S. Marine Corps. Born: February 17, 1858, Airdrie, Scotland. Accredited to: Washington, D.C. G.O. No.: 55, July 19, 1901.

Citation:

In action with the relief expedition of the Allied forces in China during the battles of 13, 20, 21, and 22 June 1900. Throughout this period and in the presence of the enemy, Stewart distinguished himself by meritorious conduct.

== See also ==
- List of Medal of Honor recipients
- List of Medal of Honor recipients for the Boxer Rebellion
