= Edwin W. Martin Jr. =

American academic (born 1931)

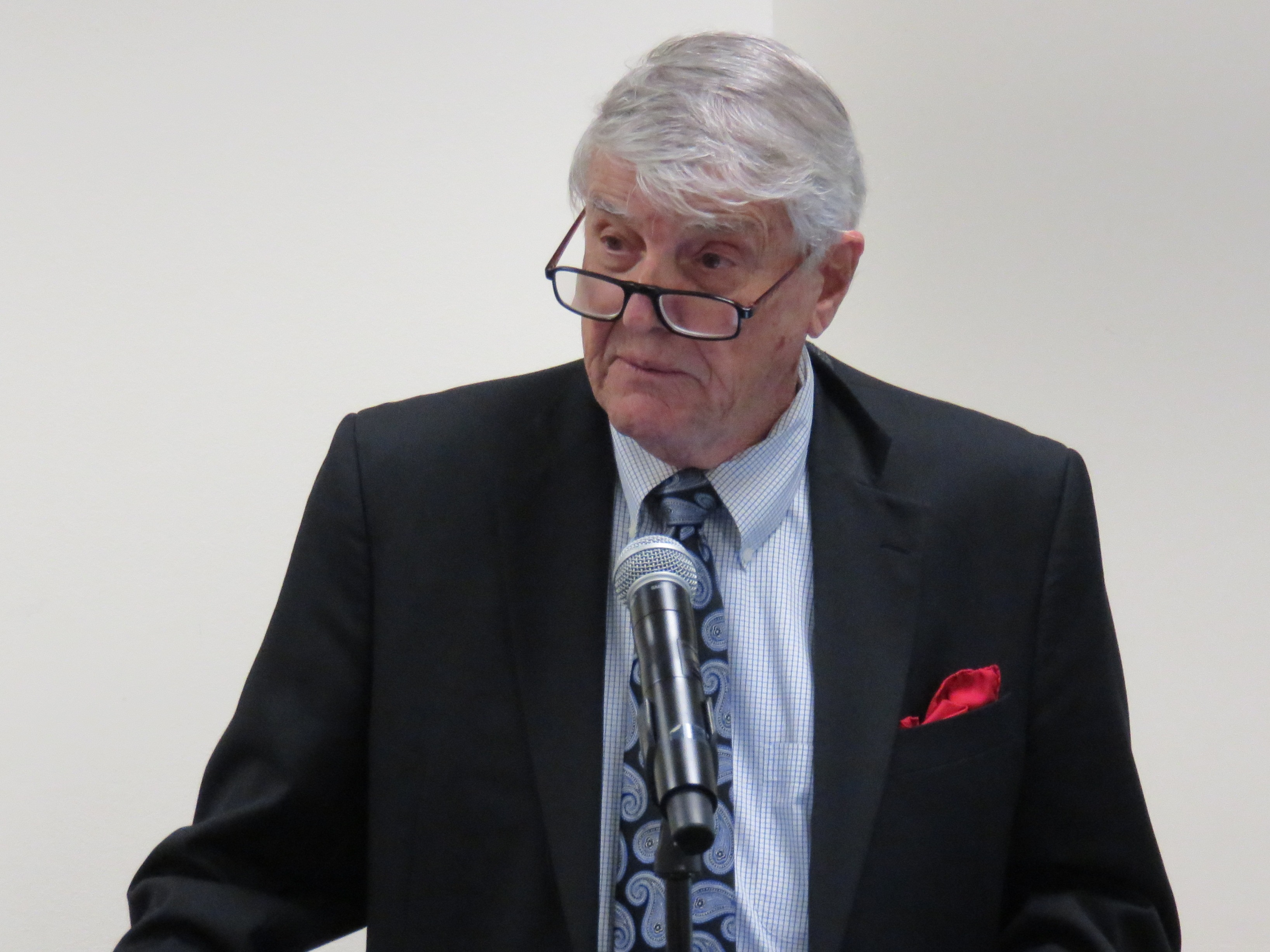
- Martin participating in a panel discussion of Pennsylvania Association for Retarded Children (PARC) v. Commonwealth of Pennsylvania, at the TASH symposium in honor of Tom Gilhool, George Washington University, Marvin Center, Washington, D.C., 14 June 2017

Assistant Secretary of Education for Special Education and Rehabilitative Services
- President: Jimmy Carter
- Preceded by: Position established
- Succeeded by: Jean S. Tufts

Personal details
- Born: September 3, 1931 (age 94) Oceanside, New York
- Education: A.B., Muhlenberg College, 1953; M.A., University of Alabama, 1955; Ph.D., speech pathology, University of Pittsburgh, 1961
- Known for: P.L. 94-142, the Education for All Handicapped Children Act

Edwin W. Martin Jr. (born September 3, 1931) is a policymaker in the area of education for people with disabilities. He served as congressional committee staff and in the Johnson, Nixon, Ford and Carter administrations. He was instrumental in drafting the Education of All Handicapped Children Act (1975). When the Department of Education was created in 1979–1980, Martin served as the first Assistant Secretary of Education for Special Education and Rehabilitative Services.

== Early life and education ==
Martin earned his PhD from the University of Pittsburgh in Speech Pathology and Psychology. Muhlenberg College, his undergraduate college, Emerson College and Long Island University's C.W. Post College have awarded him honorary degrees.

== Public service ==
Martin began his Washington career by serving as Director of the House of Representatives's ad-hoc Subcommittee on the Handicapped in 1966-67. The subcommittee, Chaired by Rep. Hugh L. Carey of New York, drafted, and saw passed, the first Education of the Handicapped Act, Title VI of the Elementary and Secondary Education Act, (P.L. 89-750).

In 1967 Martin was invited to serve as Deputy Associate Commissioner and Deputy Director of the new Bureau of Education for the Handicapped (BEH) created by Title VI. It was a competitive Civil Service appointment.

In 1969, Martin was promoted to Associate Commissioner and Director of the Bureau, and in 1977 advanced to Deputy Commissioner, remaining Bureau Chief. During these years Martin played a key role in developing federal special education policy, drafting and advising the Congress on multiple pieces of legislation.

In 1975, he was one of a small group of hill staff members and advocates for children who drafted what became P.L. 94-142, the Education of All Handicapped Children Act, a landmark bill in which states promised to educate all their handicapped children to qualify for federal funding for such programming. In 1990, the law became known as the Individuals with Disabilities Education Act (IDEA).

President Carter appointed Martin to serve as the nation's first Assistant Secretary of Education for Special Education and Rehabilitative Services, to head the newly created Office of Special Education and Rehabilitative Services (OSERS). He was confirmed unanimously by the Senate. He served in that role until he was succeeded by President Reagan's appointee, Jean S. Tufts, in October 1981.

In 1981, Martin received the highest accolade of the Council for Exceptional Children, the J. E. Wallace Wallin Award for Lifetime Achievement.

== Later career ==
Leaving the government in 1981, Martin became the president and CEO of three non-profit corporations serving children and adults with disabilities, The National Center for Disability Services on Long Island, New York. The Center has since been renamed The Viscardi Center. Martin's efforts won him invitations to become Lecturer in Education at the Harvard Graduate School of Education and Columbia University's Teachers College.

After retiring, Martin ran for, and won, election for the office of Mayor of Venice, Florida. He served for one three-year term from 2007-2010. He currently writes a blog opposing increased land development in the area, Inside Venice, Florida.

== Bibliography ==
- Martin, Edwin W. (2013). Breakthrough: Federal Special Education Legislation, 1965-1981. Sarasota, Fla.: Bardolf & Company. ISBN 978-1-93-884205-4.

President Jimmy Carter wrote of this book, "For the current generation of special education scholars, this book provides a valuable report on serious challenges in meeting the needs of the disadvantaged, and provides examples of how noble efforts can be successful."
