= Edward S. Martin =

US Navy Sailor and Medal of Honor recipient

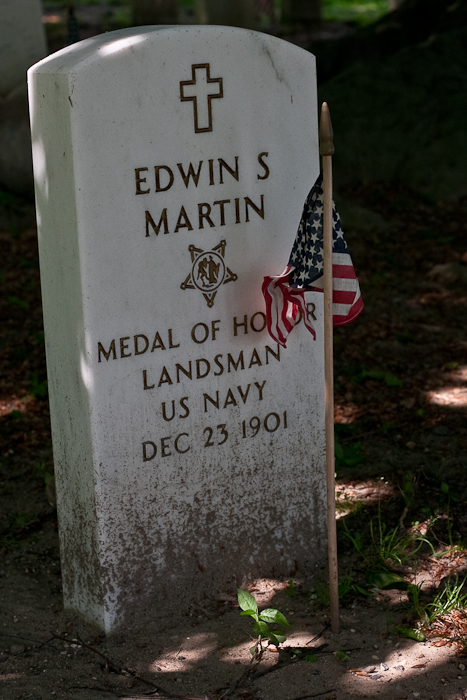
- Martin's grave marker
- Born: 1840; Ireland
- Died: December 23, 1901 (aged 60–61)
- Burial place: Cypress Hills National Cemetery, Brooklyn, New York
- Military career
- Allegiance: United States
- Branch: United States Navy
- Rank: Quartermaster
- Unit: USS Galena
- Conflicts: American Civil War • Battle of Mobile Bay
- Awards: Medal of Honor

Edward or Edwin S. Martin (1840 – December 23, 1901) was a Union Navy sailor in the American Civil War and a recipient of the U.S. military's highest decoration, the Medal of Honor, for his actions at the Battle of Mobile Bay.

Born in 1840 in Ireland, Martin immigrated to the United States and was living in Philadelphia when he joined the U.S. Navy. He served during the Civil War as a quartermaster on the USS Galena. At the Battle of Mobile Bay on August 5, 1864, he "performed his duties with skill and courage" as his ship assisted the disabled USS Oneida while under heavy fire. For this action, he was awarded the Medal of Honor a year later on June 22, 1865.

Martin's official Medal of Honor citation reads:

On board the U.S.S. Galena during the attack on enemy forts at Mobile Bay, 5 August 1864. Securely lashed to the side of the Oneida which had suffered the loss of her steering apparatus and an explosion of her boiler from enemy fire, the Galena aided the stricken vessel past the enemy forts to safety. Despite heavy damage to his ship from raking enemy fire, Martin performed his duties with skill and courage throughout the action.

Martin died on December 23, 1901, at age 60 or 61 and was buried at Cypress Hills National Cemetery in Brooklyn, New York.
