= James Martin II =

- Born: 1826; Derry, Ireland
- Died: 29 October 1895 (aged 68–69); Philadelphia, Pennsylvania, US
- Burial place: Mount Moriah Cemetery, Philadelphia, Pennsylvania
- Military career
- Allegiance: United States of America
- Branch: United States Marine Corps
- Service years: 1847–1879
- Rank: Quartermaster sergeant
- Units: USS Brandywine; USS North Carolina; USS Preble; USS Mississippi; USS Potomac; USS Wabash; USS Niagara; USS Constellation; USS Richmond; USS Vincennes; USS Memphis; USS Idaho; USS Madawaska; USS Contoocook; USS Vandalia
- Conflicts: American Civil War: Battle of Forts Jackson and St. Philip; Battle of Mobile Bay; Surrender of New Orleans
- Awards: Medal of Honor

James Martin II (1826 – 29 October 1895) was a native of Ireland who served in the U.S. Marine Corps during the mid-19th century. Rising up through the ranks from private to sergeant while fighting for the federal government of the United States (Union) during the American Civil War, he displayed conspicuous bravery on 5 August 1864, while serving aboard the USS Richmond. Operating one of that ship's guns under heavy enemy fire for two hours during the Battle of Mobile Bay, Alabama, he helped to damage the CSS Tennessee and destroy artillery batteries of the Confederate States Army at Fort Morgan, even as the enemy's shell and shot damaged his ship and killed several of his shipmates. In recognition of his gallantry, he was presented with the Medal of Honor, the United States' highest award for valor, on 31 December 1864.

== Formative years ==
Martin was born in 1826 in Derry in the Kingdom of Ireland. He emigrated sometime before July 1847 when he enrolled for military service in Philadelphia, Pennsylvania. On 18 April 1860, he became a naturalized American citizen by action of the U.S. District Court in Philadelphia.

== Military service ==
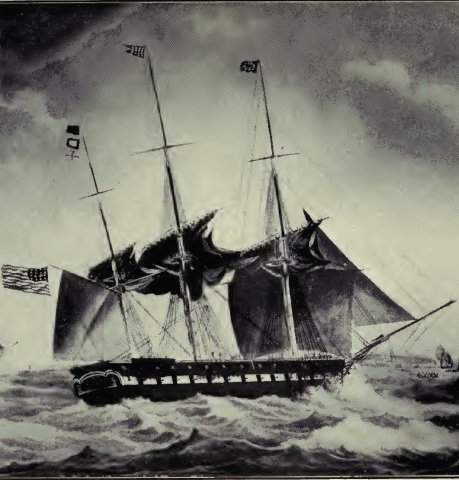
USS Brandywine shown off the coast of Malta, circa 1831.

At the age of 21, James Martin enlisted for military service with the United States Marine Corps. After enrolling in Philadelphia, Pennsylvania on 9 July 1847, he was designated as a private and assigned to land duties there prior to transfer to the Marine Barracks in Washington, D.C. (14 July) and Roanoke, Virginia (10 August). Assigned to a Marine Detachment aboard the USS Brandywine beginning on 30 August, he remained with that ship until transferred to the Marine barracks in Brooklyn, New York on 14 December 1850. Reassigned to the USS North Carolina on 23 January 1851, he re-enlisted on 9 May of that year, and served aboard the North Carolina (or the USS Mississippi) before transferring to the USS Preble on 4 August 1851. Reassigned to duties at the Philadelphia Naval Barracks on 30 October 1852, he then continued to serve on land in Washington, D.C. and Norfolk, Virginia until assigned to the USS Mississippi on 22 November of that year. Reassigned to land duties at the Brooklyn Naval Barracks on 26 April 1855, he re-enlisted for another tour of duty on 9 May, and was transferred briefly to Roanoke before being reassigned to the USS Potomac (3 July), where he remained until transferred to the USS Wabash on 18 August 1856. Stationed aboard ship until November of that year, he then moved back and forth between the naval barracks in Brooklyn and Washington, D.C., until reassigned to the USS Niagara on 2 April 1857. Assigned to land duties at the Brooklyn Naval Barracks again beginning 2 December of that year, he was then reassigned to the USS Constellation from 11 June – 6 August 1858, when he was stationed at the Boston Naval Barracks prior to reassignment on the USS North Carolina through 10 May 1959. Re-enlisting again the next day, he was transferred briefly to the Boston Naval Barracks, and was then stationed on the USS Constellation from 13 June of that year through most of the first year of the American Civil War.

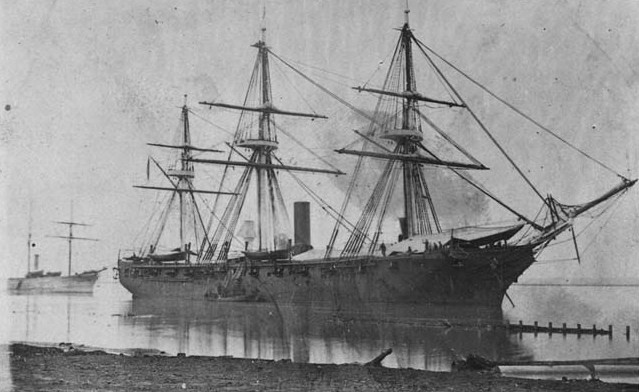
USS Richmond, Baton Rouge, Louisiana, 1863.

Assigned briefly to land duties at the naval barracks in Portsmouth and Brooklyn, he was then reassigned to the USS Richmond on 31 January 1862, where he continued to serve until transferred to the USS Pensacola on 18 May 1863. Returned to land duties in August of that year, he re-enlisted again and was promoted to the rank of sergeant on 26 August 1863, and returned to the USS Richmond. Engaged with other Union soldiers and sailors in attacks on Fort St. Philip, Fort Jackson and the Chalmette batteries in Louisiana under the command of Admiral David Farragut from 16 to 28 April 1862, Martin was also present for the resulting surrender of New Orleans to Union forces, as well as the attack on Vicksburg, Mississippi in late June and early July that same year.

Still attached to Farragut's squadron in 1864, which had been engaged in a blockade of Mobile, Alabama since 1 November 1863, and serving as a sergeant stationed aboard the USS Richmond, he performed the actions for which he would later be awarded the U.S. Medal of Honor. As captain of a gun during the Battle of Mobile Bay on the morning of 5 August 1864, he displayed "coolness and good conduct" as he continued firing for two hours, helping to damage the CSS Tennessee and destroy the batteries at Fort Morgan while under heavy enemy fire which damaged his ship and killed several of his fellow crewmen.

Afterward, he and his Richmond shipmates continued to occupy Mobile Bay. In May 1865, he transferred to the USS Vincennes, served briefly on land at the marine barracks in Pensacola, Florida, beginning 12 July, and was then reassigned to the USS Memphis on 26 December 1865.

== Post-war military service and later life ==
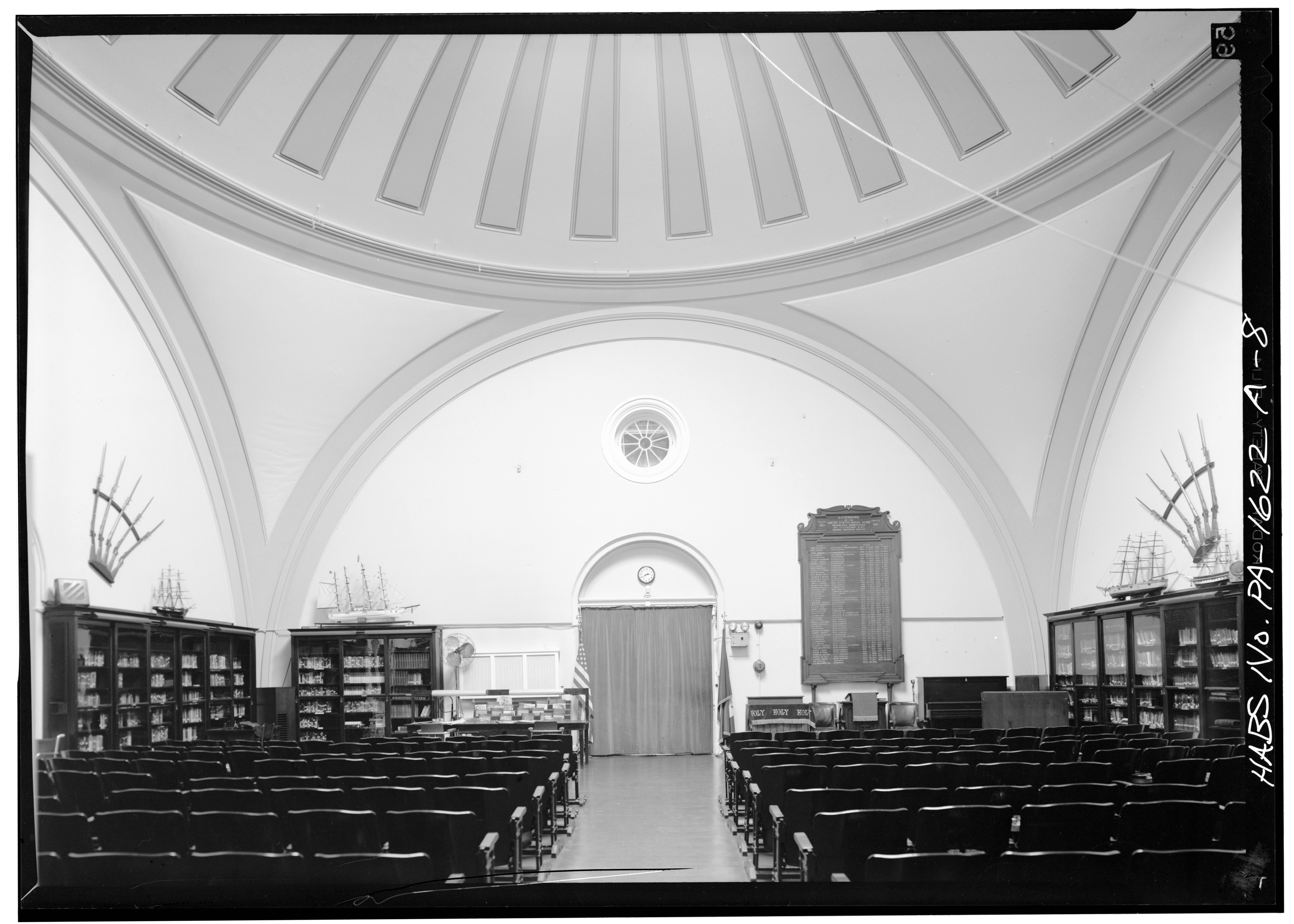
Chapel, U.S. Naval Asylum, Philadelphia, circa 1933.

Post-war, Martin continued to serve aboard the USS Memphis until reassigned to land duties from 3 February – 3 April 1866. After being transferred to the USS Idaho, he continued to alternate between life aboard ship and on land, punctuated by re-enlistments, for the remainder of his military career. Duty assignments included: the USS Madawaska, beginning 27 June 1866; the USS Contoocook, beginning 14 March 1868; and the USS Vandalia in 1871. After having achieved the rank of quartermaster sergeant and having completed 31 years, 7 months and 23 days of military service, he was honorably discharged on 27 March 1879. Military records at the time of his pension application in 1881 described him as being 5' 9-1/2" tall with brown hair, grey eyes and a fair complexion, and also noted that he was a native of Ireland who had been a farmer at the time of his enrollment in Philadelphia.

Records from the U.S. Navy Department's Bureau of Medicine and Surgery, which were compiled for Martin's Navy Survivors' Certificate file, documented that Martin sustained multiple service-related injuries and ailments during his naval career, including: rheumatism (first documented in the late 1840s); a subluxation of his left ankle (1858); hip pain and rheumatism (1861); a contusion sustained on 12 April 1862, when his "arm was squeezed in working a gun, whilst at quarters", which resulted in a nine-day admission to a U.S. Navy Hospital that year and was linked by a Navy doctor in 1879 to the atrophy of his bicep (via the notation "the result of an injury to the arm while loading a gun on board the 'Richmond', in April, 1862"); a sprained ankle (1874); a severe fall down the stairs while in the line of duty at a naval barracks (1875); and anemia attributed to his "long and continuous service in the Marine Corps" (1879).

Unmarried, Martin resided at the U.S. Naval Home in Philadelphia during the 1880s and 1890s.

== Illness, death and interment ==
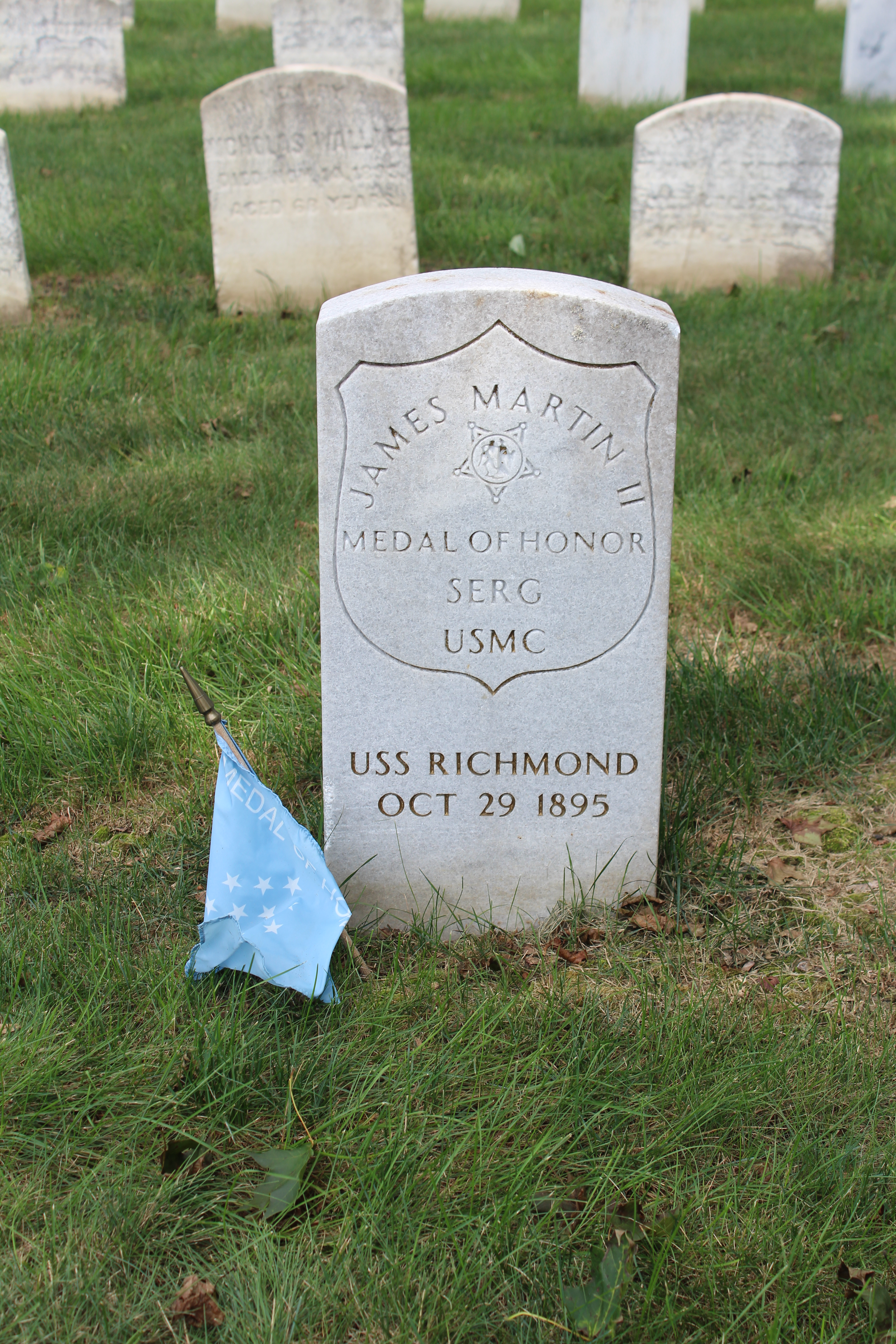
James Martin II headstone in Mount Moriah Cemetery Naval Plot

By the time he was in his 60s, Martin had developed cancer. He died at the U.S. Naval Home in Philadelphia, Pennsylvania, on 29 October 1895, and was interred in Mount Moriah Cemetery.

== Medal of Honor citation ==
Rank and organization: Sergeant, U.S. Marine Corps. Born: 1826, Derry, Ireland. Accredited to: Pennsylvania. G.O. No: 45, 31 December 1864. Citation:

As captain of a gun on board the USS Richmond during action against rebel forts and gunboats and with the ram Tennessee in Mobile Bay, 5 August 1864. Despite damage to his ship and the loss of several men on board as enemy fire raked her decks, Sgt. Martin fought his gun with skill and courage throughout the furious 2-hour battle which resulted in the surrender of the rebel ram Tennessee and in the damaging and destruction of batteries at Fort Morgan.

== See also ==
- Thomas Cripps
- Irish Americans in the American Civil War
- List of American Civil War Medal of Honor recipients: M–P
- List of Medal of Honor recipients
- Mobile, Alabama in the American Civil War
- New Orleans in the American Civil War
- Pennsylvania in the American Civil War
