= Joseph Killackey =

United States Navy Medal of Honor recipient

- Killackey (right) with fellow Medal of Honor recipient August P. Teytand (left) in 1942
- Born: January 21, 1879; County Cork, Ireland
- Died: September 8, 1946 (aged 67)
- Burial place: Mount Moriah Cemetery Philadelphia, Pennsylvania
- Military career
- Allegiance: United States of America
- Branch: United States Navy
- Rank: Gunner's Mate Third Class
- Conflicts: Boxer Rebellion
- Awards: Medal of Honor

Joseph Killackey (January 21, 1879 – September 8, 1946) was an American sailor serving in the United States Navy during the Boxer Rebellion who received the Medal of Honor for bravery.

== Biography ==
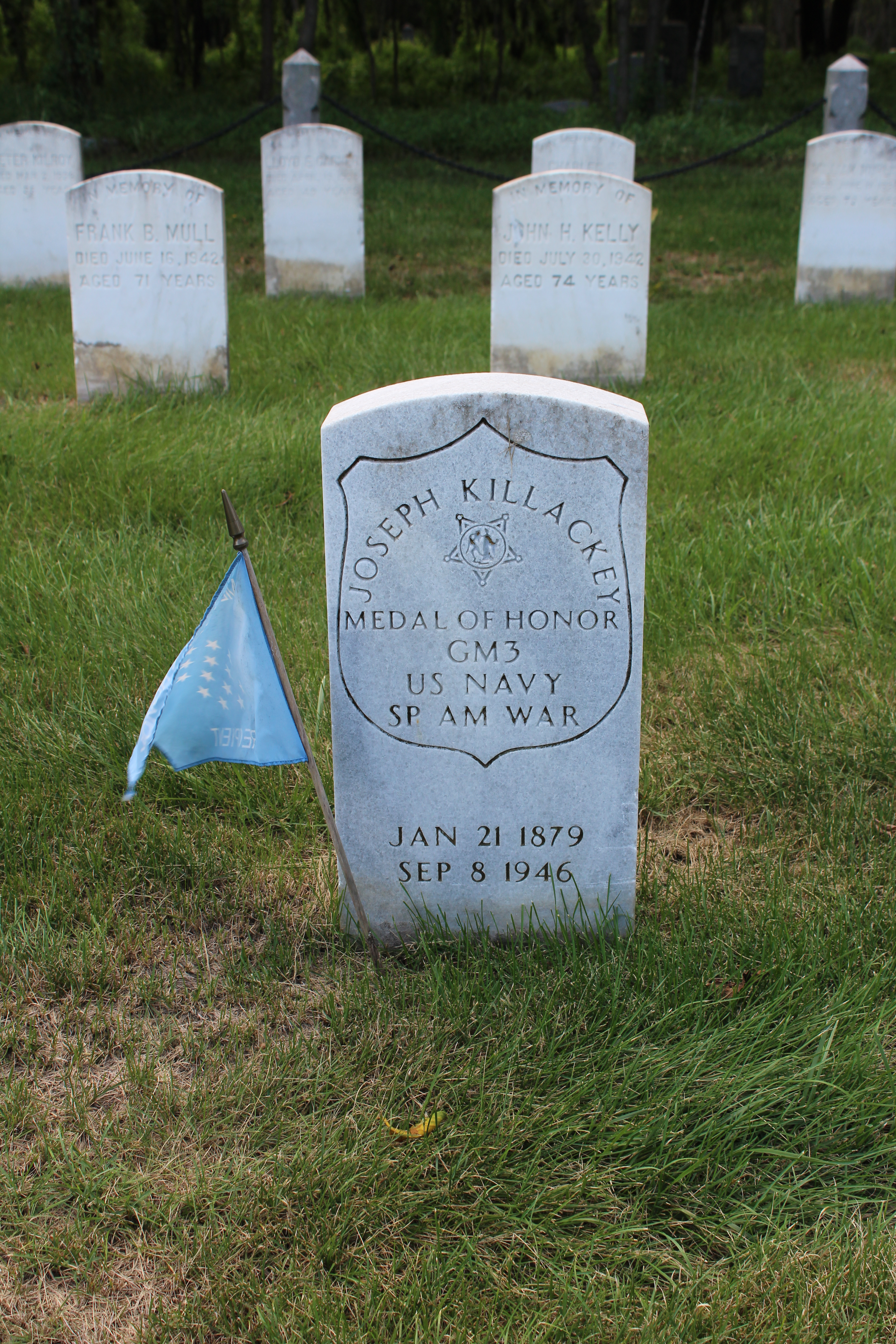
Joseph Killackey grave at Mount Moriah Cemetery Naval Plot

Killackey was born January 21, 1879, in Cork County, Ireland, and after entering the navy he was sent as a Landsman to China to fight in the Boxer Rebellion.

He died September 8, 1946, and is buried at Mount Moriah Cemetery in Philadelphia, Pennsylvania. His grave can be found in the naval asylum plot.

== Medal of Honor citation ==
Rank and organization: Landsman, U.S. Navy. Born: 21 January 1879, Cork County, Ireland. Accredited to: Pennsylvania. G.O. No.: 55, 19 July 1901.

Citation:

In action with the relief expedition of the Allied forces in China, 13, 20, 21 and 22 June 1900. During this period and in the presence of the enemy, Killackey distinguished himself by meritorious conduct.

== See also ==
- List of Medal of Honor recipients
- List of Medal of Honor recipients for the Boxer Rebellion
