= Angora, Philadelphia =

Angora
- Neighborhood
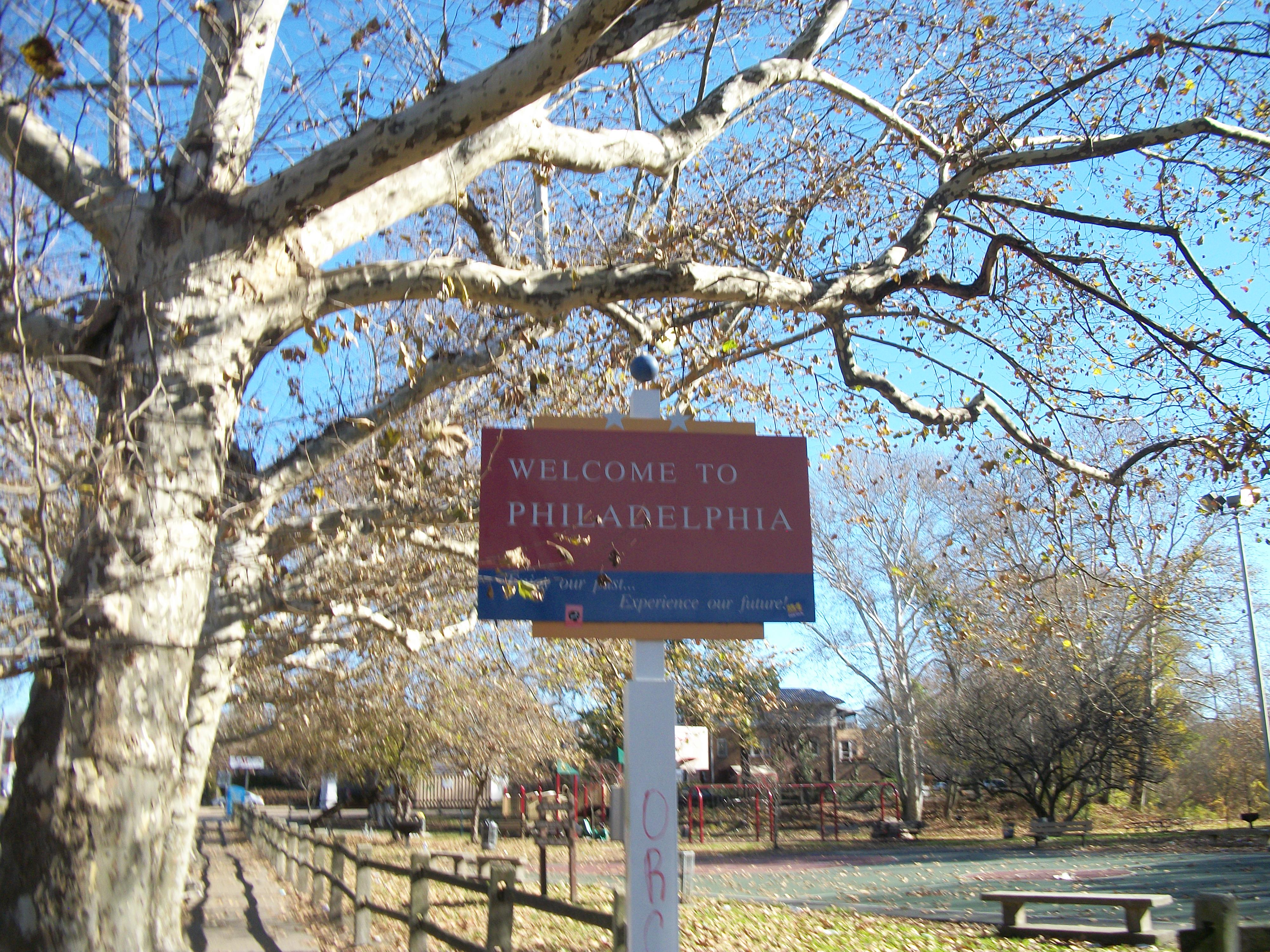
- A sign welcomes US 13 drivers to the City of Philadelphia in Angora.

- Location within Philadelphia
- Country: United States
- State: Pennsylvania
- County: Philadelphia
- City: Philadelphia
- Area codes: 215, 267, and 445

Angora is a neighborhood in the West Philly section of Philadelphia, Pennsylvania, United States. Although its boundaries are not precise, it is roughly bounded by the Cobbs Creek neighborhood to the north, Cobbs Creek to the west, Kingsessing to the south and east, and Cedar Park to the east. The Angora Commuter Rail Station on the Media/Wawa Line, two bus lines (routes 46 and "G"), and a trolley line (SEPTA Route 34) all intersect around Baltimore Avenue and 58th Street, which is unofficially the nexus of the neighborhood.

On May 12, 2005, a commercial block in Angora was certified as blighted by the City Planning Commission, and a redevelopment plan was proposed later that year. However, Angora Terrace and other portions of the neighborhood are well-kept.

== History ==
The neighborhood was founded by Robert and George Callaghan in 1863, who named it for Ankara, the city in Turkey. The landscape was sparsely populated for decades, and a surrounding woodland provided a bucolic environment seemingly separate from the city of which it was part. Development began in earnest between 1900 and 1920.

In its founding, it was the site of the Callaghan textile mill; later, in the early 20th century, a mill that produced yarn and a factory that produced glass were erected. This industry was accompanied by the relatively limited development of residential areas within the neighborhood, mainly restricted to the 5800 block of Baltimore Avenue (between 1918 and 1920) and to an area that once was a grove of trees, known as Sherwood Forest. A nearby attraction for residents (mainly children and older residents) was Kingsessing Park, in the Kingsessing neighborhood, in which a recreation center was constructed in 1918.

Of note was the Sherwood Cricket Club of Angora. A watercolor of it can be found at the PhillyH2O website. Cricket was an important sport at that time, with the Belmont Cricket Club, in West Philadelphia, being one of the most prominent venues in the country. There are many references to the Sherwood Cricket Club of Angora on cricketarchive.com.
