= Lewis Richards =

Lewis Richards may refer to:

- Lewis Richards (footballer, born 2001), English-Irish footballer for Wolves and Bradford City
- Lewis Richards (footballer, born 1861), Welsh footballer and FA Cup winner
- Lewis Richards (sailor), Union Navy sailor in the American Civil War
- Lou Richards (1923–2017), Australian rules footballer
