= Mount Moriah Cemetery (Philadelphia) =

Historic cemetery in Philadelphia and Yeadon, Pennsylvania, US

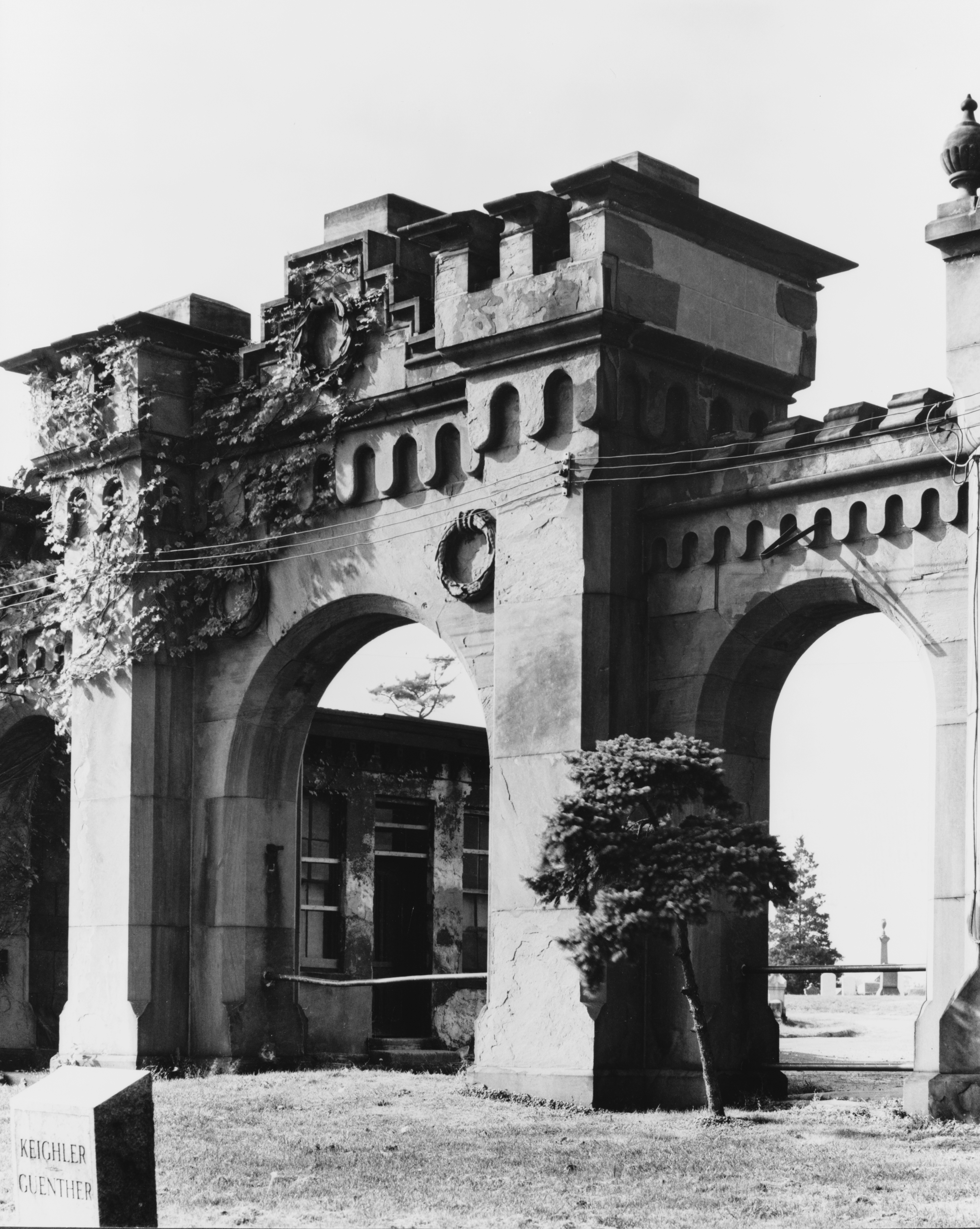
- The Mount Moriah Cemetery Gate, designed by Stephen Decatur Button in 1855
- Interactive map of Mount Moriah Cemetery

Details
- Established: 1855
- Location: Philadelphia, Pennsylvania, U.S.
- Country: United States
- Coordinates: 39.9297°N 75.2356°W
- Owned by: Mount Moriah Cemetery Preservation Corporation
- Size: 200 acres
- No. of graves: 150,000
- Website: Friends of Mount Moriah Cemetery

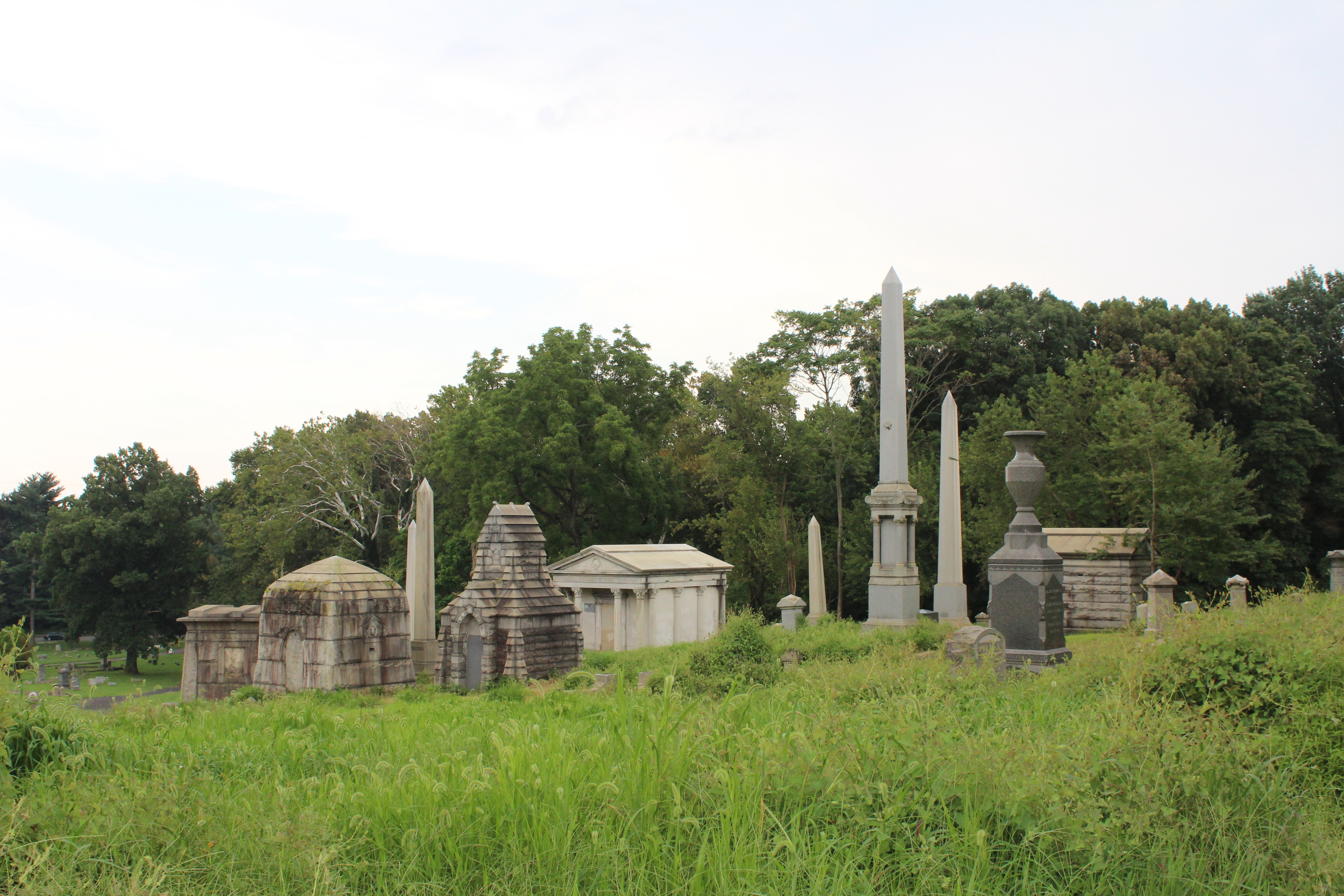
Mausoleum Hill on the Yeadon side of the cemetery

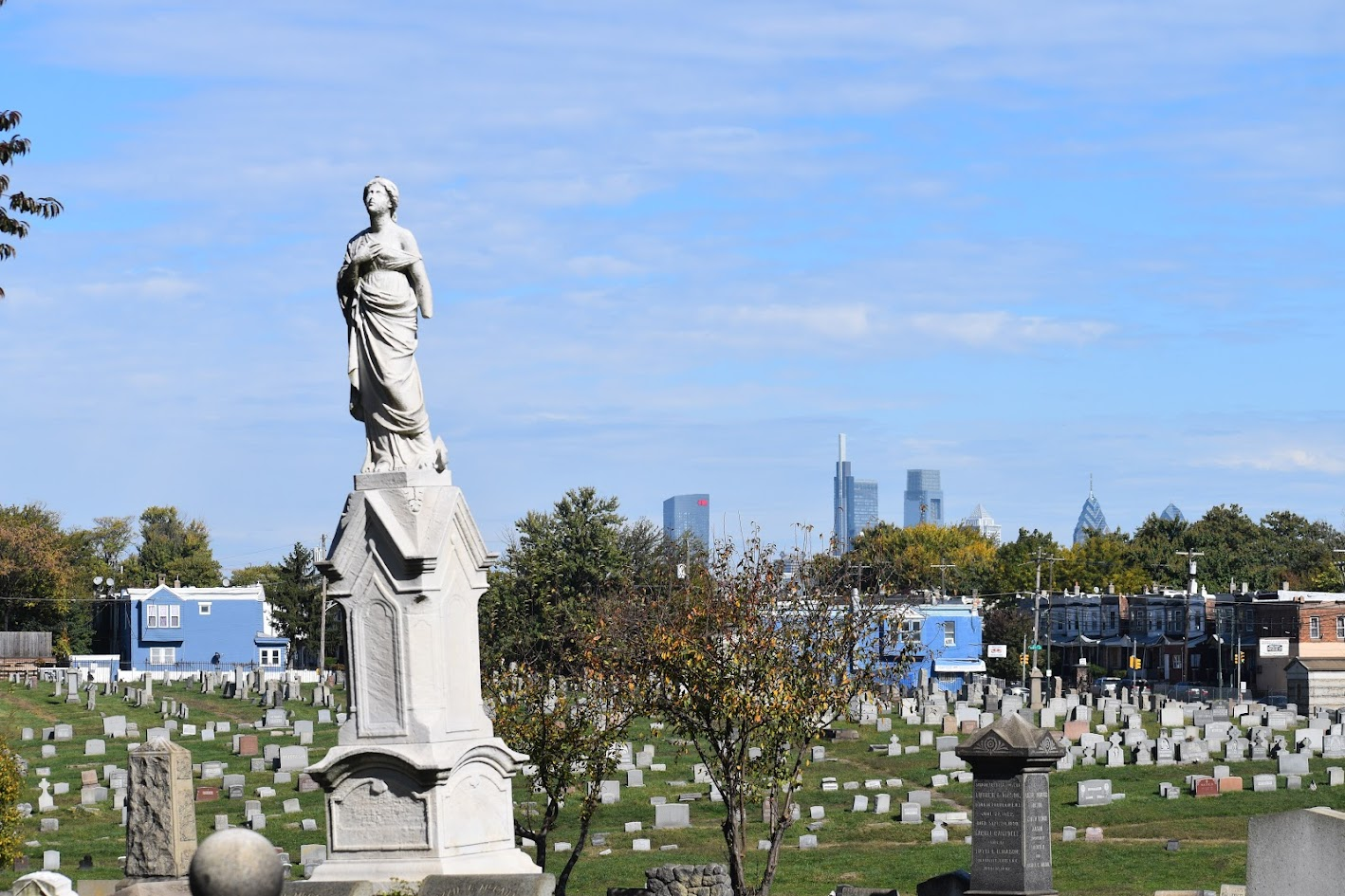
View of Center City Philadelphia skyscrapers from near the Gatehouse

Mount Moriah Cemetery is a historic rural cemetery that spans the border between Southwest Philadelphia and Yeadon, Pennsylvania, United States. It was established in 1855 and is the largest cemetery in Pennsylvania. It is 200 acres in size and contains 150,000 burials. It differed from Philadelphia's other rural cemeteries such as Laurel Hill Cemetery and the Woodlands Cemetery in that it was easily accessible by streetcar; allowed burials of African-Americans, Jews and Muslims; and catered to a more middle-class clientele.

The cemetery is a part of the United States National Cemetery System dating back to the American Civil War. It contains two military burial plots that are maintained by the United States Department of Veterans Affairs. The Soldiers' Lot on the Philadelphia side of the cemetery contains 406 burials and the Naval Plot on the Yeadon side contains 2,400 burials.

The cemetery closed its gates in April 2011 and had no owner when the last member of the board of directors died. It became wildly overgrown with vegetation, was a site for illegal dumping, and the buildings, graves and monuments fell into disrepair. A non-profit organization called The Friends of Mount Moriah Cemetery formed to clear overgrown brush, maintain graves, stabilize the crumbling gatehouse and raise money for a petition to place the cemetery on the National Register of Historic Places. The Orphans Court of Philadelphia granted a second organization, the Mount Moriah Cemetery Preservation Corporation, a receivership in 2014.

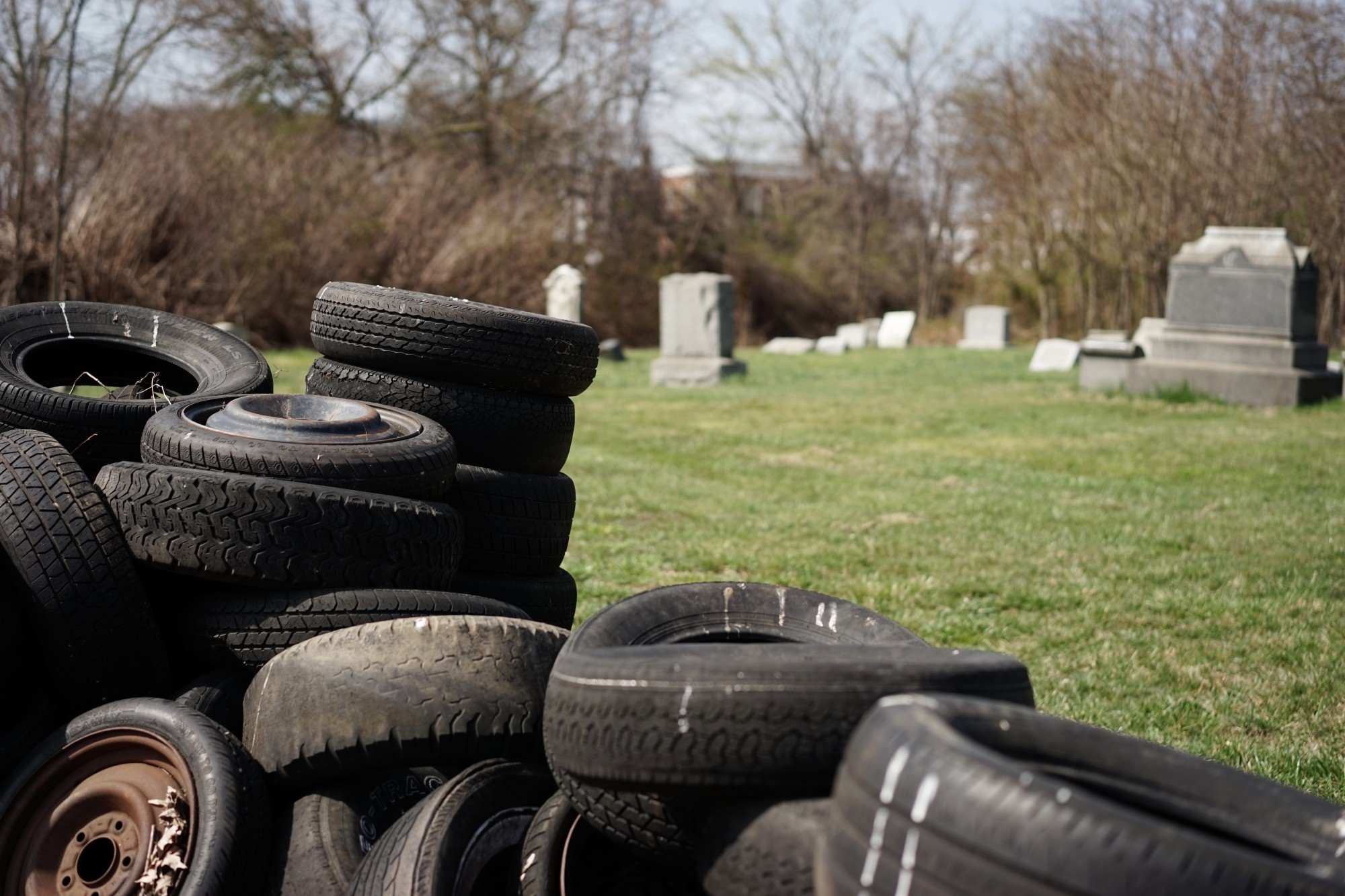
The cemetery became overgrown and a site of illegal dumping before the Friends of Mount Moriah Cemetery initiated clean up efforts

== Description ==
The cemetery originally occupied 54 acres but grew to approximately 200 acres, with some estimates as high as 380 acres, making it the largest cemetery in Pennsylvania. Philadelphia and Yeadon share almost equal shares of the cemetery with Cobbs Creek separating the two sides. After the construction of Cobbs Creek Parkway, the cemetery is slightly less than 160 acres.

A Norman Castellated brownstone gatehouse designed by Stephen Decatur Button was built at the entrance on Islington Lane, today known as Kingsessing Avenue. A single gated arch was topped with an imposing statue of Father Time. The statue was purchased, removed from the gate and placed atop the grave of John H. Jones.

The cemetery contains two separate military burial plots dating back to the U.S. Civil War that are maintained by the Department of Veterans Affairs. The Naval Plot on the Yeadon side of the cemetery contains 2,400 graves of sailors who were treated at the Grays Ferry Avenue Naval Hospital. A smaller plot of 406 graves known as the Soldier's Rest is on the Philadelphia side of the cemetery. Mount Moriah contains veterans of the Revolutionary War through the Vietnam War and 25 Medal of Honor awardees which may be the highest number of any private cemetery. There is one British Commonwealth war grave of a soldier of the Royal Scots from World War I.

One section of the cemetery, known as the Circle of St. John or Masons Circle, contains the Schnider monument, a 35-foot high Corinthian column topped by the Masonic square and compasses dedicated to William B. Schnider, the Grand Tyler of Pennsylvania's Central Grand Lodge.

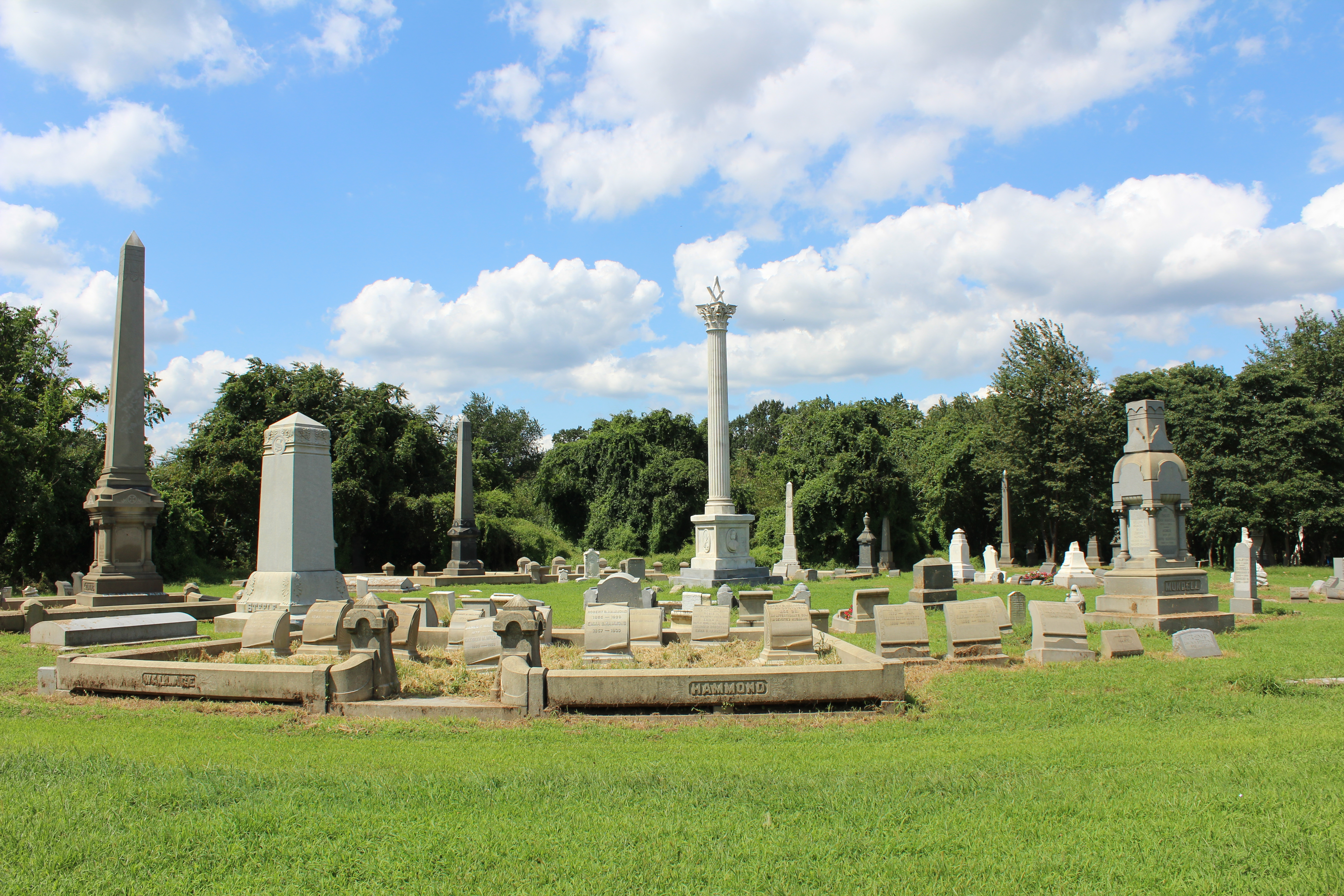
The Circle of St. John with the Schnider Monument in the center

The size of the cemetery made it ideal for churches and fraternal organizations that wanted to purchase large plots for their members. The Free and Accepted Masons, Odd Fellows, Knights of Pythias, Elks, Actors' Order of Friendship and Order of United American Mechanics all purchased large lots in the cemetery. Local private institutions, including the Presbyterian Home for Widows and Single Women and the Seaman's Church Institute also purchased large lots.

== History ==
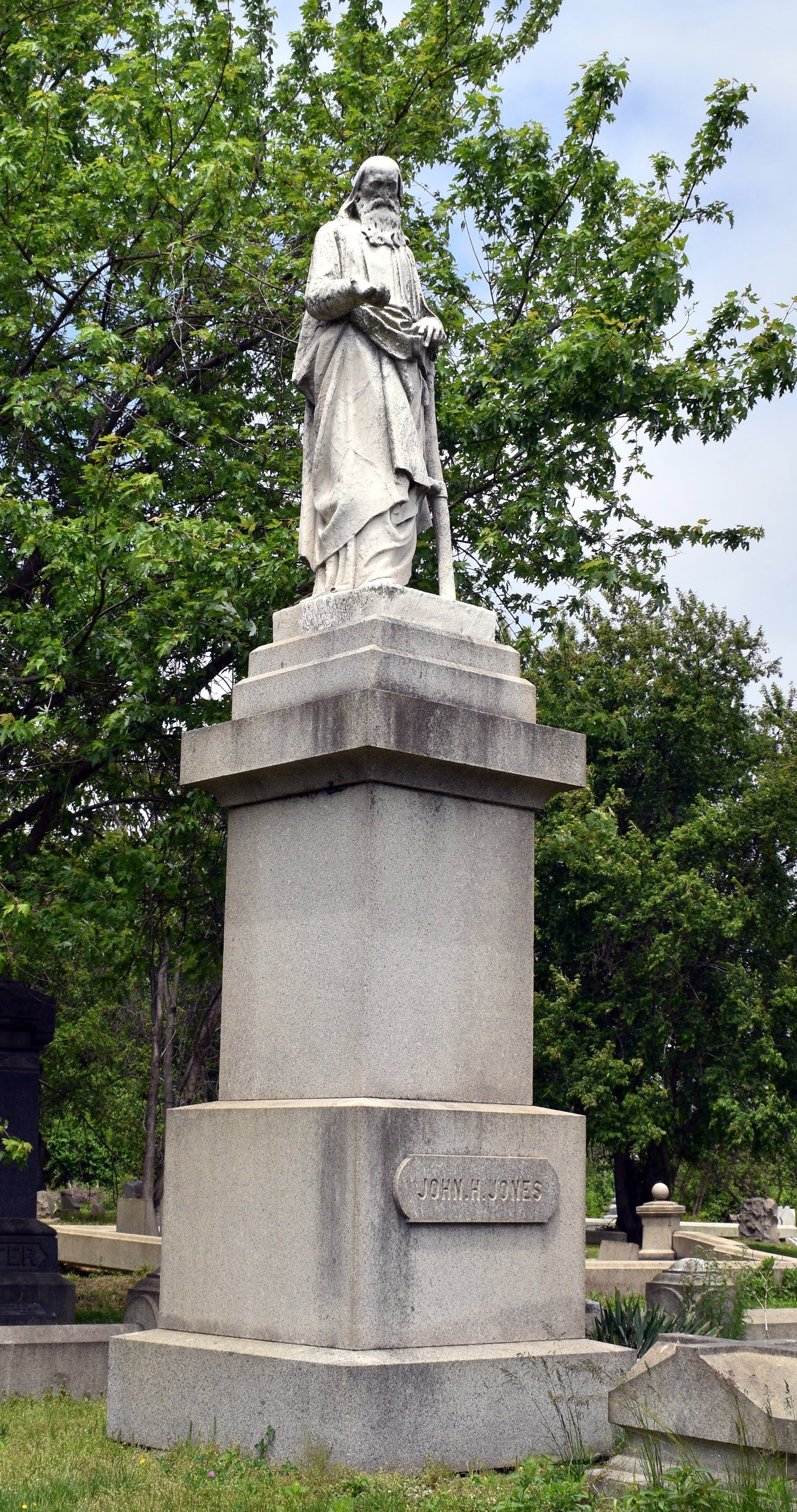
This statue of Father Time adorns the grave of John H. Jones. It used to sit atop the entrance gate

Mount Moriah Cemetery was established by an act of the Pennsylvania Legislature and incorporated on March 27, 1855. The cemetery was expanded to approximately 380 acres, spanning Cobbs Creek into the Borough of Yeadon in adjacent Delaware County, making it the largest cemetery in Pennsylvania.

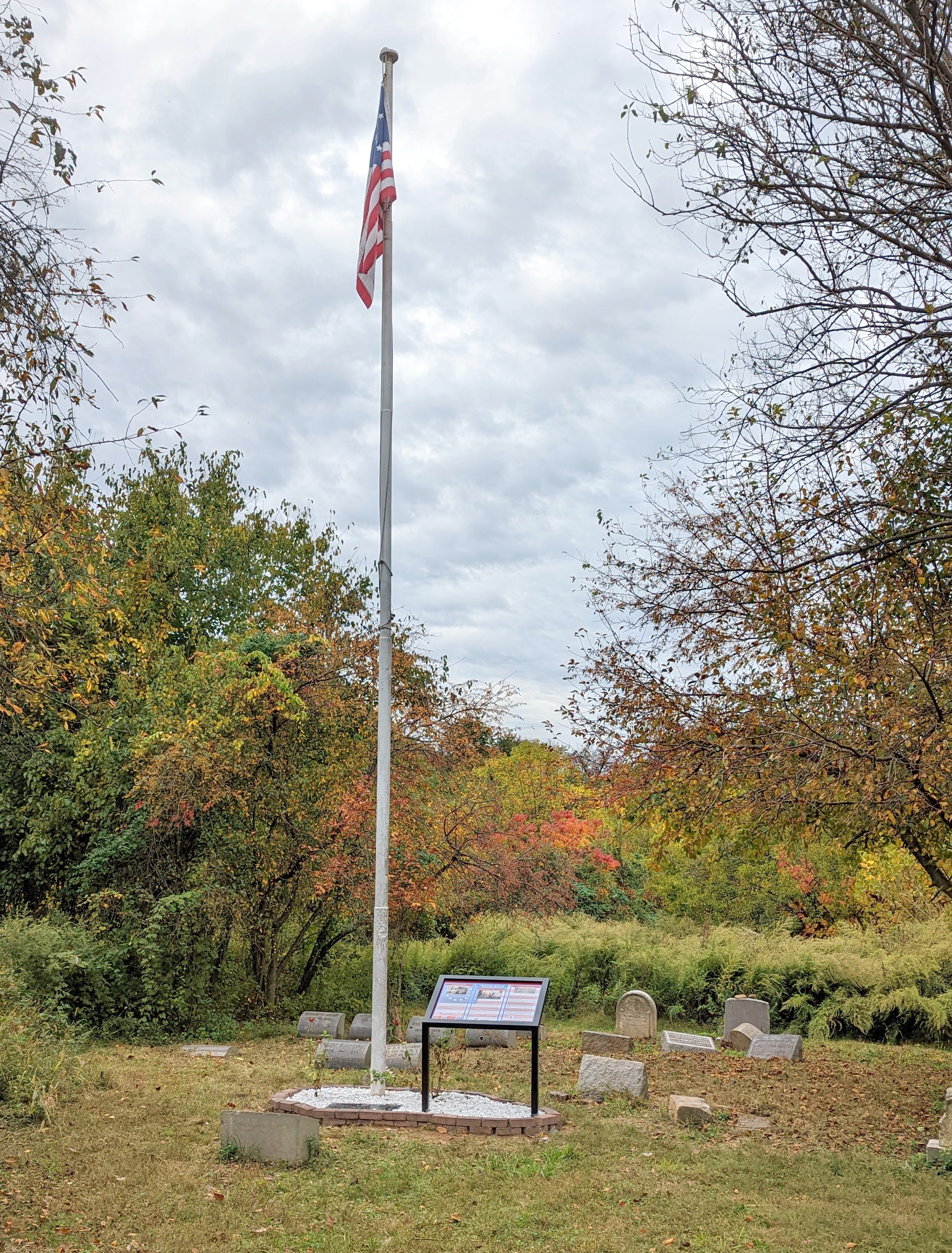
The Daughters of the American Revolution erected a flagpole to commemorate the estimated burial site of Betsy Ross

In 1856, the remains of Betsy Ross and her third husband John Claypoole were moved from the Free Quaker Burying Ground in Philadelphia to Mount Moriah. The practice of cemeteries purchasing the remains of famous historical individuals was common in order to drive additional business. The Daughters of the American Revolution erected a flagpole at the site of her grave in her memory.

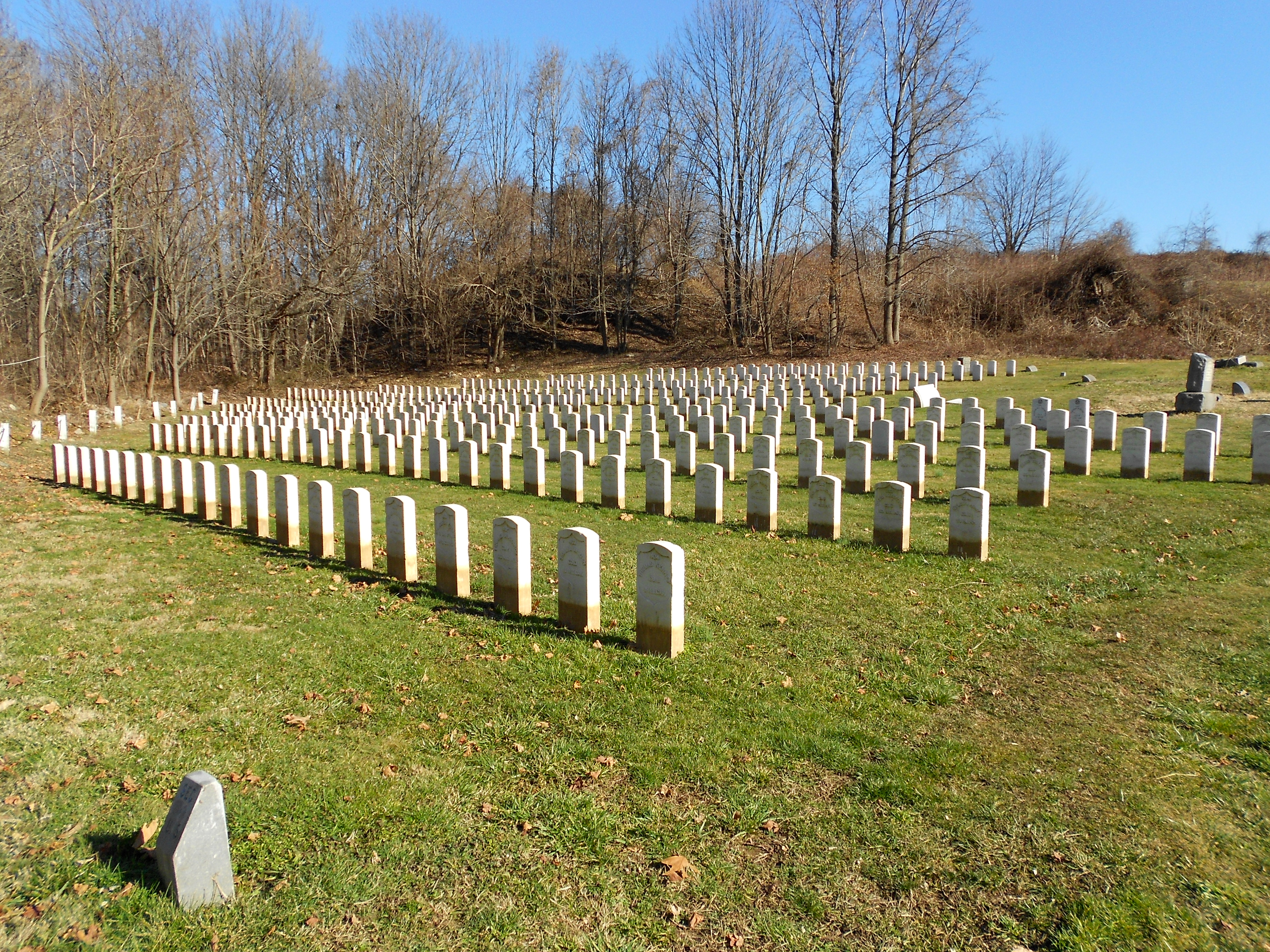
The Soldiers' Lot contains the graves of 404 Union Soldiers and 2 Confederate Soldiers

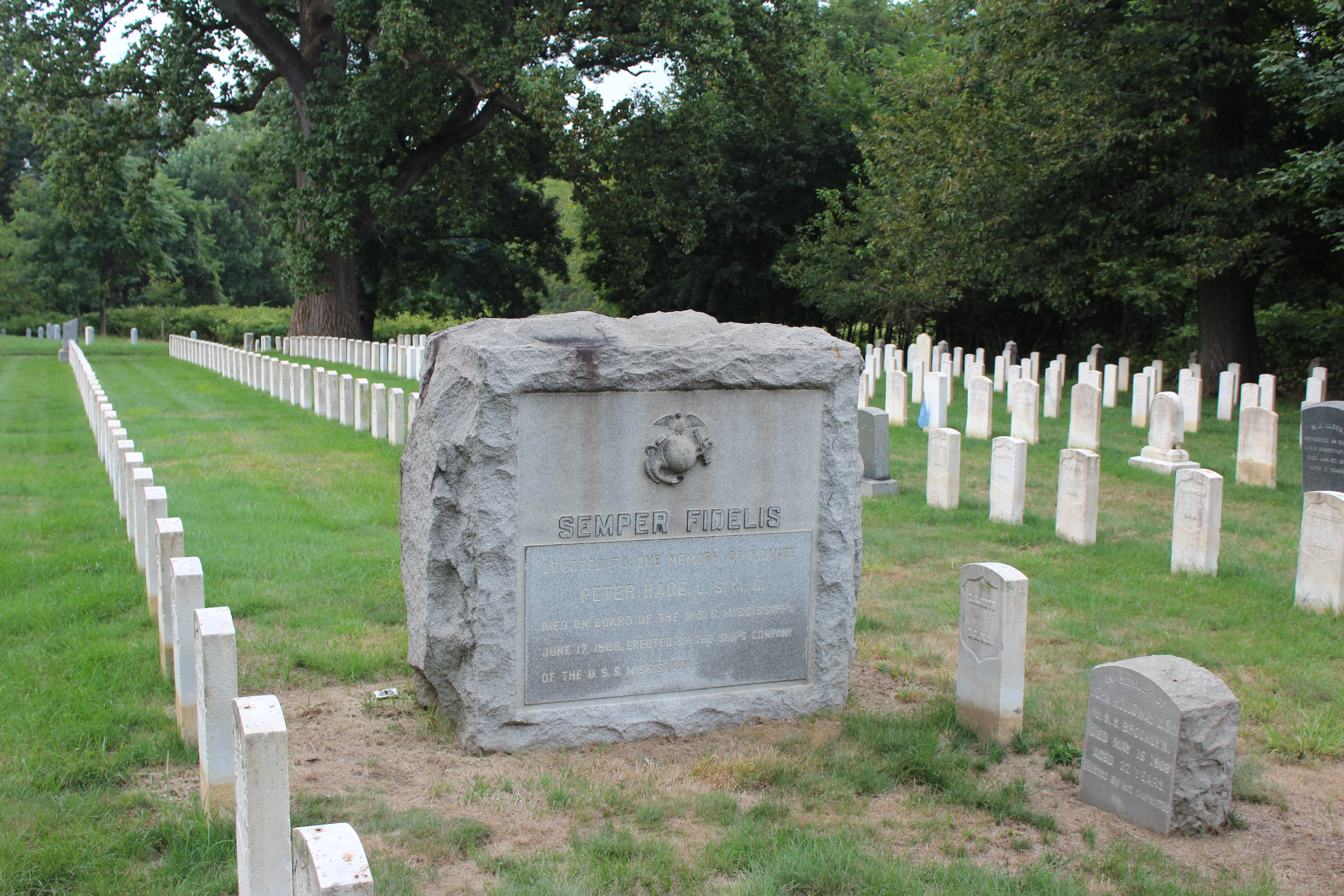
The Naval Plot contains 2,400 U.S. Navy officers and seamen

Mount Moriah is a part of the United States National Cemetery System. In 1864, the United States Federal Government purchased two parcels of land within Mount Moriah Cemetery. The Soldiers' Lot on the Philadelphia side of the cemetery was purchased for soldiers who died at local military hospitals and contains 404 Union Army soldiers. The lot initially included the remains of six Confederate soldiers, however in 1885 all but two were reinterred at Philadelphia National Cemetery. The Naval Plot on the Yeadon side of the cemetery is ten acres in size and was purchased for the reinterment of bodies previously buried at the U.S. Naval Home. The Naval Plot today contains 2,400 U.S. Navy officers and seamen.

In the early 1870s, Henry Jones, an affluent African-American man who worked as a caterer, purchased a lot for burial in Mount Moriah Cemetery. After his death in 1875, his funeral procession was blocked from entering the cemetery by white lot owners and cemetery authorities who refused to bury him because of his race. A lawsuit was filed against the Mount Moriah Cemetery Association and in 1876 the Pennsylvania Supreme Court ruled that Jones had the right to be buried in the cemetery. During the court case, his body was stored at a funeral vault at Lebanon Cemetery in Philadelphia. Jones' family had decided to bury him at Lebanon Cemetery but he may have been buried at the Church of St. James the Less cemetery in Philadelphia instead.

In the 1930s, the Works Progress Administration program performed work at Mount Moriah Cemetery to improve the drainage system throughout the cemetery.

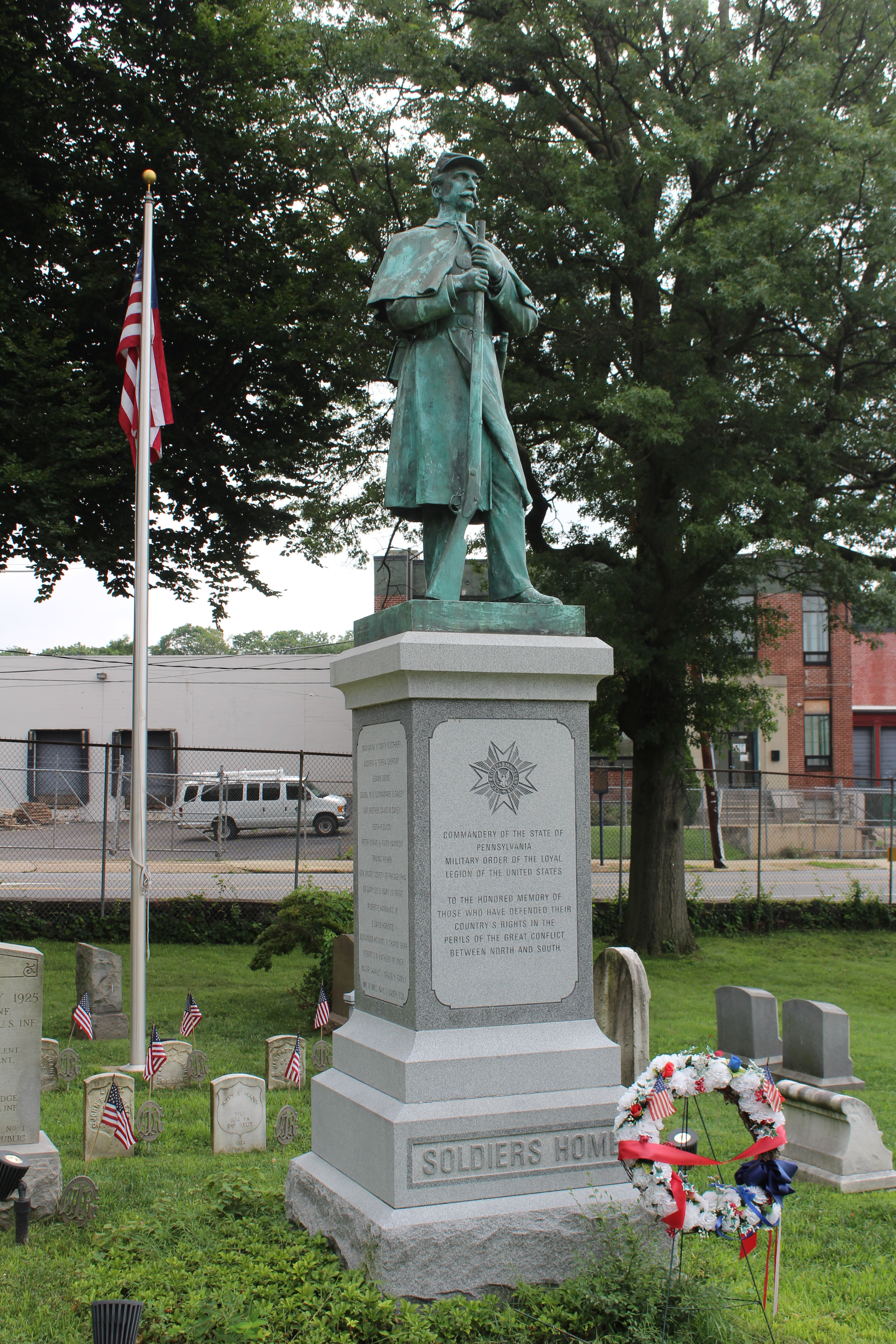
In 1970, thieves stole "The Silent Sentry" statue from Mount Moriah and attempted to sell it for scrap metal. It was relocated and rededicated in 2013 in Laurel Hill Cemetery

In 1970, a 700-pound, 7 foot 2 inch high bronze statue of a Civil War soldier was removed from its base and stolen by thieves. The statue was named "The Silent Sentry", cast at the Bureau Brothers Foundry and dedicated in 1883. It was originally placed in the Soldiers' Home of Philadelphia burial plot. The thieves attempted to sell the statue for scrap metal to a Camden, New Jersey, scrap yard but the scrap dealer notified the authorities. It was recovered and repaired by the Military Order of the Loyal Legion of the United States. In 2013, the statue was relocated and rededicated in Laurel Hill Cemetery.

In December 1975, Betsy Ross's descendants petitioned to have her remains moved to the Betsy Ross House. The headstone at her grave had been stolen years before. A physical anthropologist, Dr. Alan Mann, moved some bones in 1976 from the estimated vicinity of her grave but was unable to determine whether they belonged to Ross or not.

In January 2026, Jonathan Gerlach of Ephrata, Pennsylvania, was arrested and charged with burglary, abuse of a corpse, and the desecration and theft of venerated objects stolen from Mount Moriah Cemetery. Authorities investigated vandalism and theft of 26 mausoleums and underground vaults from the cemetery that began in fall 2025. Gerlach was caught leaving the cemetery at night with a sack containing the mummified remains of two children, three skulls, and various loose bones. An investigation of his house in Ephrata revealed over 100 pieces of human bones stolen from the cemetery.

== Closure and preservation efforts ==
Horatio Jones, the last known member of the Mount Moriah Cemetery Association, died in 2004 and the cemetery closed its gates in 2011 in a unique legal situation having no known owner. In 2012, due to complaints and reports of the deteriorating situation, Philadelphia and Yeadon formed the Mount Moriah Cemetery Preservation Corporation, a 7-member board charged with building a redevelopment plan for the cemetery. In 2014, Philadelphia Orphan's Court appointed Mount Moriah Cemetery Preservation Corporation as receiver for the long neglected cemetery. The Friends of Mount Moriah Cemetery, Inc., a non-profit organization, held regular restoration events and progress was made to return the cemetery to normal condition. Expected annual maintenance costs are about $500,000.

In February 2015, the Pennsylvania Historical and Museum Commission announced that the cemetery was eligible to be listed on the National Register of Historic Places, subject to review by the NRHP. The Friends of Mount Moriah Cemetery raised funds to stabilize the crumbling gatehouse.

In January 2019, the Friends of Mount Moriah Cemetery presented their strategic plan to the Philadelphia City Planning Commission to convert Mount Moriah Cemetery into a nature sanctuary similar to the nearby Bartram's Garden and John Heinz National Wildlife Refuge.

While Mount Moriah ceased to be an active burial ground after 2011, the Orphan's Court has permitted two interments to take place. Paulette Rhone, the president of the Friends of Mount Moriah Cemetery, died in February 2019. The Friends petitioned the Orphan's Court to allow her burial in the cemetery. She was interred in the grave site next to her late husband. Her efforts on behalf of the cemetery and the community were honored in August 2019 by symbolically renaming the section of Kingsessing Avenue in front of the cemetery "Paulette Rhone Place." Another interment was permitted in July 2024 when almost 500 sets of bones, disinterred from the former location of First Baptist Church cemetery in the Old City neighborhood of Philadelphia, were re-interred in Mount Moriah Cemetery. The bones had been in storage since 2017 when they were unearthed during the construction of apartments. The bones were re-buried in the First Baptist Church section of Mount Moriah where the majority of remains from the original First Baptist Church cemetery had been re-interred in 1860.

External videos
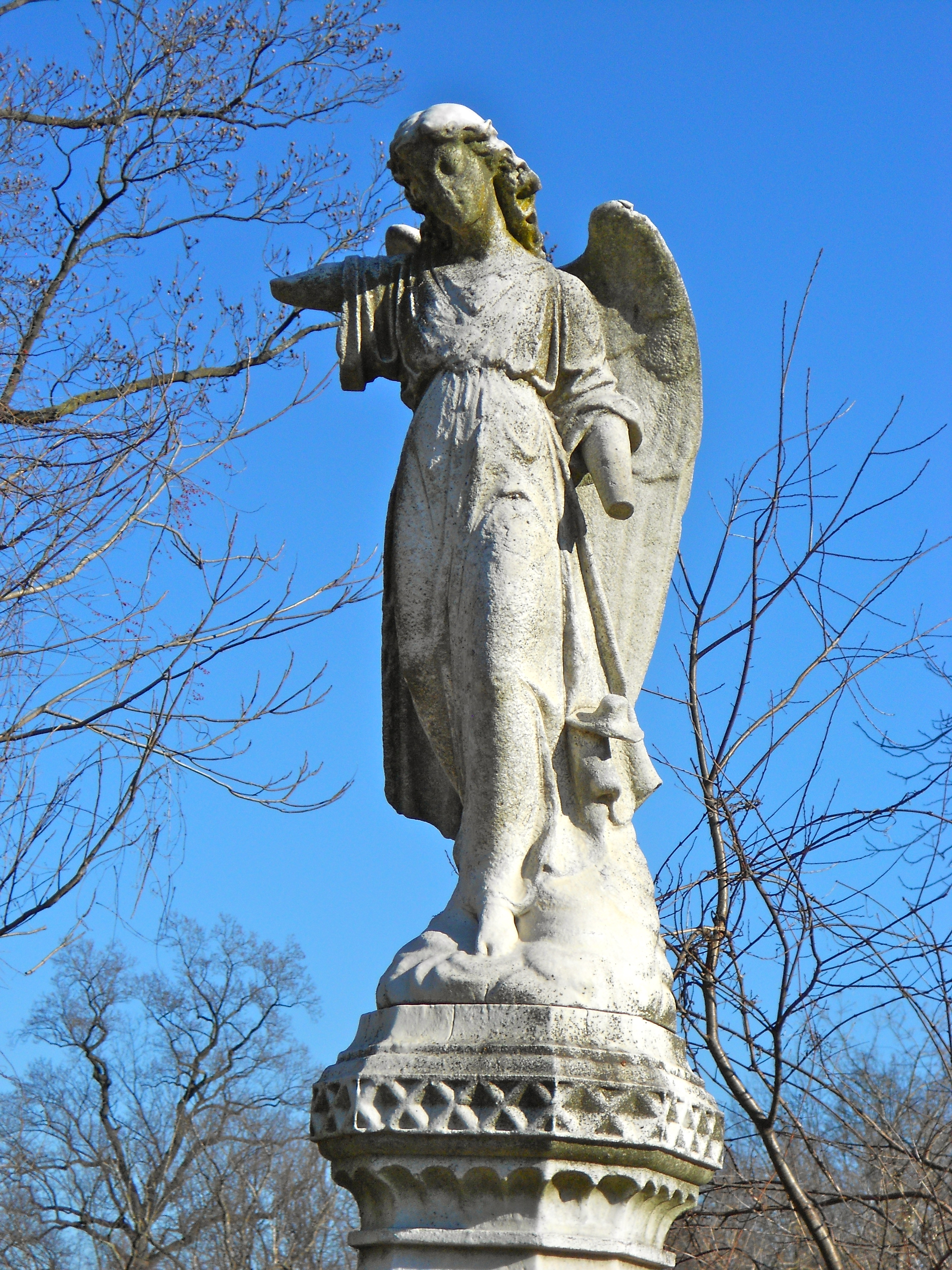
- In Memoriam, Courtney Coombs 16:12, December 2013

External videos
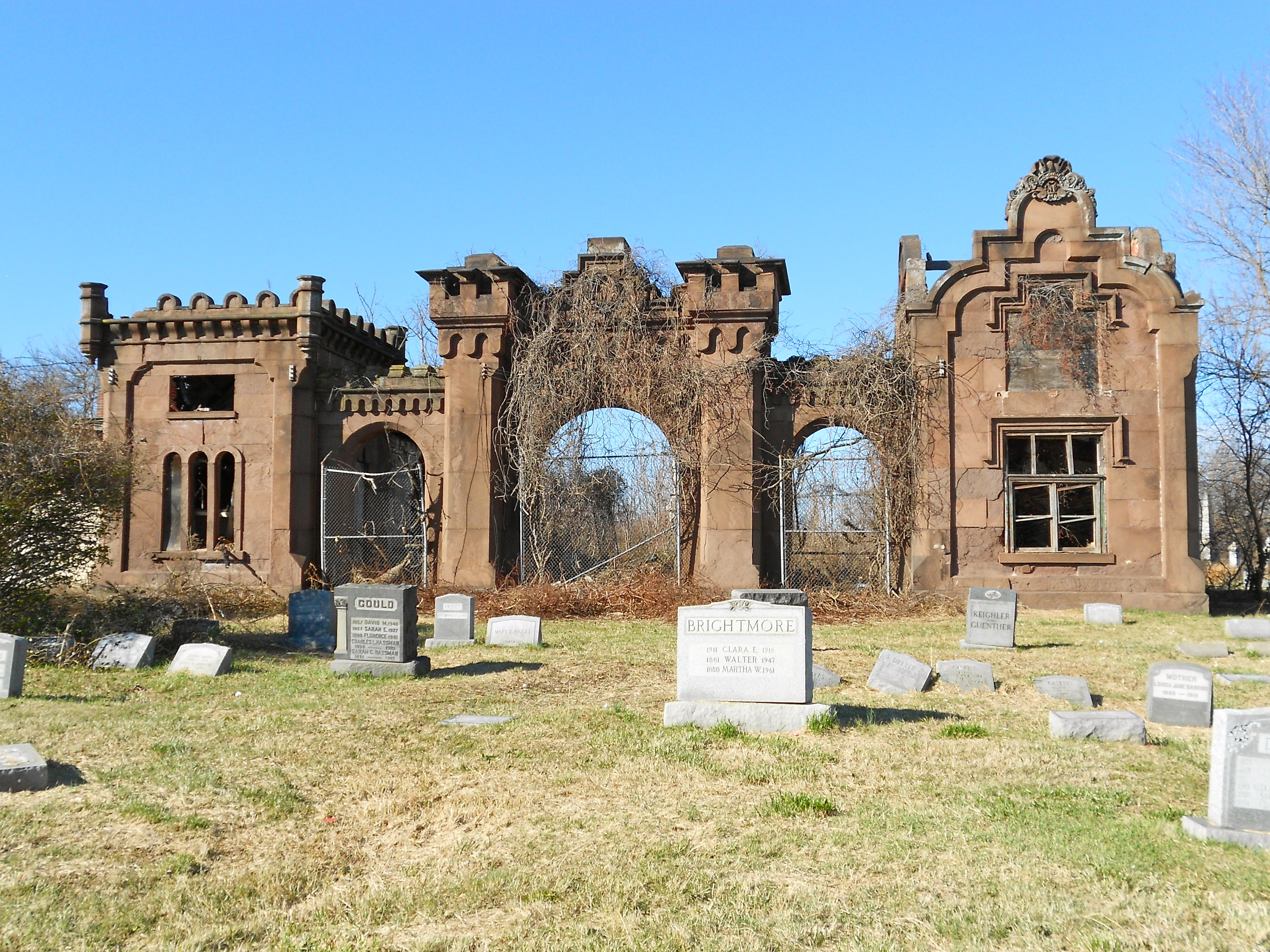
- 3D Laser Scan: Mount Moriah Cemetery Gatehouse (1:05), DJS Associates

== Notable burials ==
- Edwin Adams (1834–1877), stage actor
- Charles Baker (1809–1891), Medal of Honor recipient
- Albert Beyer (1859–1929), Medal of Honor recipient
- Annie Kemp Bowler (? – 1876), stage actress and singer
- Augustus C. Buell (1847–1904), fraudulent author
- Richard Risley Carlisle (1814–1874), gymnast and acrobat
- George Connell (1871–1955), mayor of Philadelphia
- William Cusick aka Mickey Duffy (1888–1931), prohibition era mobster
- George Deary (1845–1901), Medal of Honor recipient
- John Deasley (1864–1910), professional baseball player
- Pat Deasley (1857–1943), professional baseball player
- George B. Dovey (d. 1909), president and owner of the Boston Doves National League Baseball Club
- Israel Wilson Durham (1855–1909), state senator, owner of the Philadelphia Phillies baseball team
- Jesse Elliott (1782–1845), naval commander in the War of 1812
- George Ewell (1850–1910), American professional baseball player.
- George N. Galloway (1841–1904), Medal of Honor recipient
- John Galloway (d. 1904), Medal of Honor recipient
- John C. Grady (1847–1916), Pennsylvania State Senator for the 7th district from 1877 to 1903
- Bill Greenwood (1857–1902), baseball player
- Daniel McBride Graham, abolitionist, inventor, first president of Hillsdale College
- A. O. Granger (Arthur Otis Granger; 1846–1914), American industrialist and soldier
- Robert Heller (born William Henry Palmer, 1826–1878), magician
- Robert Jordan (1826–1881), Medal of Honor recipient
- Joseph Killackey (1879–1946), Medal of Honor recipient
- Thomas Kittera (1789–1839), U.S. Representative for Pennsylvania
- John Laverty (1842–1903), double Medal of Honor recipient
- Nicholas Lear (1826–1902), Medal of Honor recipient
- Art Loudell (1882–1961), professional baseball player
- Benjamin Loxley (1720–1801), Philadelphia master-builder and carpenter-architect
- Thomas G. Lyons (1838–1904), Medal of Honor recipient
- James Martin, II (1826–1895), Medal of Honor recipient
- Sylvester H. Martin (1841–1927), Medal of Honor recipient
- William McCandless (1834–1884), Civil War Union Army officer
- Matthew McClelland (1832–1883), Medal of Honor recipient
- John Edward McCullough (1832–1885), Shakespearean tragic actor
- Samuel Miles (1739–1805), French & Indian War officer, Revolutionary War officer, Philadelphia civic activist, 1st Troop Captain (1786–1791), Mayor (1790–1791), and nation's first faithless elector, presidential election, 1796.
- John "Jocko" Milligan (1861–1923), baseball player
- Moses Orr (1840–1897), Medal of Honor recipient
- Michael Owens (1837–1890), Medal of Honor recipient
- Betsy Ross (1752–1836), upholsterer credited with making the first American flag
- Henry Shutes (1804–1889), Medal of Honor recipient
- Joseph Hill Sinex (1819–1892), Pennsylvania State Representative, Civil War Union Officer
- Samuel Sloan (1815–1884), architect
- John Smith (1826–1907), Medal of Honor recipient
- William Burns Smith, (1844–1917), Mayor of Philadelphia 1884–1887
- John Murray Spear (1804–1887), Spiritualist clergyman
- Thomas H. Stockton (1808–1868) Chaplain of the United States House of Representatives
- August P. Teytand (1878–1956), Medal of Honor recipient
- William Thompson (d. 1872), Medal of Honor recipient
- Alexander H. Truett (1833–1898), Medal of Honor recipient
- John Whitehead (1948–2004), singer, songwriter
- John Williams (1828–1866), Medal of Honor recipient
- Francis A. Wilson (1840–1888), Medal of Honor recipient
- Robert E. Winslow (1829–1893), Civil War Union Army officer
- John Russell Young (1840–1899), journalist, diplomat, and Librarian of Congress

== See also ==
- Mount Moriah (SEPTA station)
- Mount Moriah, Philadelphia – the surrounding neighborhood
