= Thomas Lyons (Medal of Honor) =

American Civil War Medal of Honor recipient (1838–1904)

- Born: c. 1838; Salem, Massachusetts, US
- Died: August 29, 1904 (aged 65–66)
- Military career
- Allegiance: United States; Union
- Branch: Union Navy
- Rank: Seaman
- Units: USS Pensacola
- Conflicts: American Civil War
- Awards: Medal of Honor

Thomas Lyons (c. 1838 – August 29, 1904) was a sailor in the United States Navy and a recipient of the U.S. military's highest decoration, the Medal of Honor, for his actions during the American Civil War.

Lyons was born sometime in about 1838 in Salem, Massachusetts. On April 24, 1862, he was on board USS Pensacola during the attack on Fort Jackson and Fort St. Philip. Lashed outside of that vessel, on the port-sheet chain, with the lead in hand to lead the ship past the forts, Lyons never flinched, although under a heavy fire from the forts and Confederate gunboats. His actions earned the Medal of Honor.

== Medal of Honor citation ==
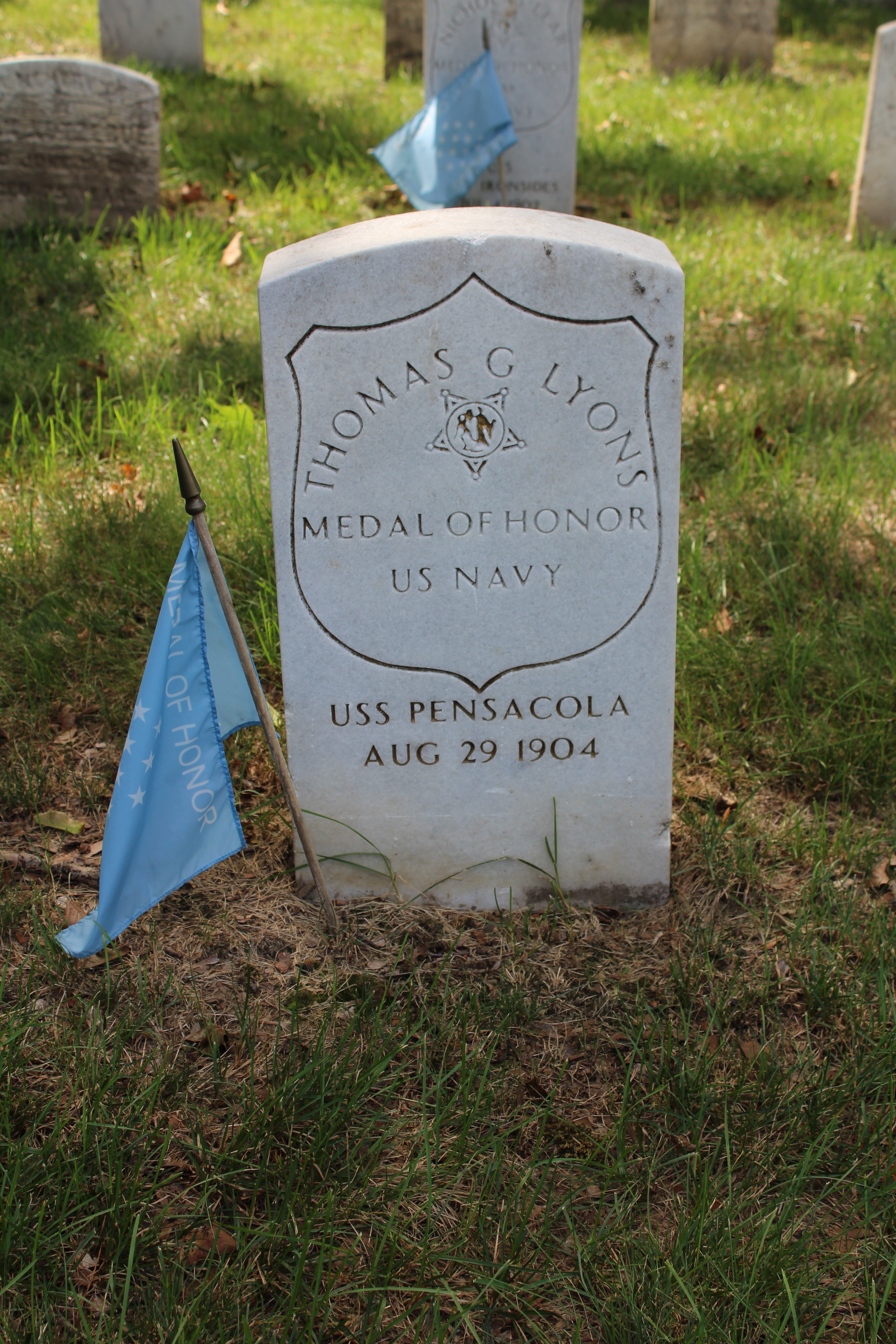
Thomas G. Lyons headstone in Mount Moriah Cemetery Naval Plot

Rank and Organization: Seaman, U.S. Navy. Born: 1838, Salem, Mass. Accredited To: Massachusetts. G.O. No.: 169, February 8, 1872

Citation:

Served as seaman on board the U.S.S. Pensacola in the attack on Forts Jackson and St. Philip, 24 April 1862. Carrying out his duties throughout the din and roar of the battle, Lyons never once erred in his brave performance. Lashed outside of that vessel, on the port-sheet chain, with the lead in hand to lead the ship past the forts, Lyons never flinched, although under a heavy fire from the forts and rebel gunboats.

He died on August 29, 1904, and is interred at Mount Moriah Cemetery in Philadelphia, Pennsylvania.

== See also ==
- List of American Civil War Medal of Honor recipients: G–L
