= Augustus Caesar Buell =

Discredited American historian (1847–1904)

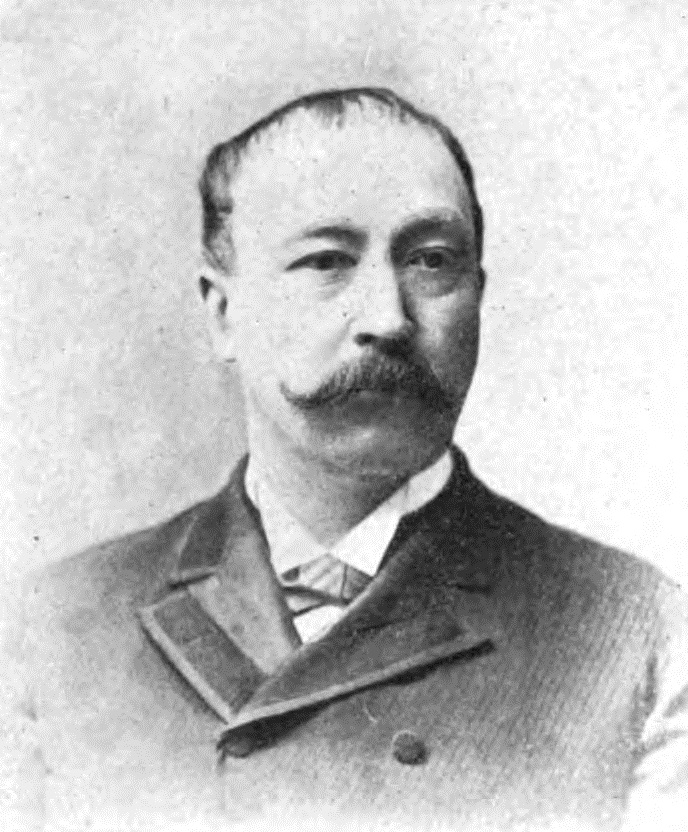
- Born: September 4, 1847; Norwich, New York, US
- Died: May 23, 1904 (aged 56); Philadelphia, Pennsylvania, US
- Resting place: Mount Moriah Historic Cemetery & Arboretum
- Known for: Author of allegedly fraudulent biographies about Prominent Americans
- Spouse(s): Helen Elizabeth Slocum (1843-?) (m. 1864); 2nd Gertrude --- in 1894.
- Parent(s): Simon and Julia Buell

Augustus Caesar Buell (September 4, 1847 – May 23, 1904) was an American author who wrote biographies (of John Paul Jones, Sir William Johnson, William Penn, Andrew Jackson) following the success of a book about his experiences in the Civil War. A large amount of his material was alleged to be plagiarised or made up. Some of Buell's since-discredited claims (derived from fabricated imaginary sources) were repeated by later biographers and historians, and thus promulgated.

== Biography ==
Buell was born in 1847 to Simon and Julia Buell near Norwich, New York. He was raised in New York City and is known to have enlisted in Company L of the 20th New York Cavalry, on August 21, 1863. He was promoted to corporal three months later, but was then demoted the following April, and he left the service in July 1865. He later claimed to have risen to the rank of colonel. For some years he lived in New York State, but his literary career began some time after he had moved to Philadelphia, to work for the major shipbuilding and engineering firm of William Cramp & Sons. In 1876 he was briefly arrested following an accusation of libel.

In his Civil War memoir, The Cannoneer, published in 1890, he vividly described his experiences at the Battle of Gettysburg, but that battle took place in July 1863, seven weeks before he enlisted, and two essays by Silas Felton reveal much of the hollow truth behind Buell's claims. He later claimed that a visit to St. Petersburg in Russia on behalf of Cramp's, a few years later, enabled him to find important material for his first biographical project, the life of John Paul Jones. The major demolition job on that work we owe to the far superior scholarship of Admiral Samuel Eliot Morison, who devoted an appendix to Buell's supposed lies about Jones in his own Pulitzer-winning biography. The work of scholars like Morison, which should never have been necessary, reveals the full depth of Buell's alleged fraud.

He died in 1904, and is buried at the Mount Moriah Cemetery in Philadelphia.

== Legacy ==
Milton Hamilton, editor of the papers of colonial administrator Sir William Johnson, had to do the same sort of research as Morison to uncover the truth behind Buell's 1903 production. Two further biographies, of William Penn and Andrew Jackson, were published in the months following Buell's death, by which time suspicions of his work were already growing rapidly. (Note: "Some myths are manufactured by intent, and no one more assiduously invented material to cement the "western hunter" marksmanship myth at New Orleans than the industrious Augustus C Buell, who actually created forgeries from the 1890s or earlier until his death in 1904... Buell was particularly anxious to bolster the prevailing myth that deadly American rifle marksmanship by Kentuckians and Tennesseans won the battle.") His last posthumous work may be his most truthful, the memoirs of his boss, Charles H. Cramp. About the same time as this was published, Mrs. Reginald de Koven produced the first detailed analysis of the fraudulent Buell technique, specifically his John Paul Jones biography.

== Works ==
- "The Cannoneer. Recollections of Service in the Army of the Potomac By 'A Detached Volunteer' in the Regular Artillery", in The National Tribune (Washington, D.C., 1890).
- Paul Jones, Founder of the American Navy. A History, New York, C. Scribner's Sons, 1900, 2 vols.
- Sir William Johnson, New York, D. Appleton and Company, 1903.
- William Penn as the founder of two commonwealths, New York, D. Appleton and Co., 1904.
- History of Andrew Jackson, Pioneer, Patriot, Soldier, Politician, President. Charles Scribner's Sons. 1904.
- "The memoirs of Charles H. Cramp", Philadelphia and London, J.B. Lippincott Co., 1906.

Buell's diary for 1867-68 still survives, in the Davidson Library, University of California, Santa Barbara.

== Debunking ==
- Booraem, Hendrik (2001). "Appendix I: Augustus C. Buell's History of Andrew Jackson – A Note to Researchers and Librarians". Young Hickory: the making of Andrew Jackson. Dallas, Texas: Taylor Trade Publishing. pp. 201–204. ISBN 978-0-87833-263-2. LCCN 00048820.
- Davis, William C. (2019). The Greatest Fury: The Battle of New Orleans and the Rebirth of America. London, UK: Dutton Caliber, an imprint of Penguin Random House. ISBN 978-0-39-958522-7.
- De Koven, Mrs R. (an early Jones authority) (10 June 1906). "A Fictitious Paul Jones Masquerading as the Real". The New York Times (Sunday magazine).
- Hamilton, Milton W. (October 1956). "Augustus Buell: Fraudulent Historian". Pennsylvania Magazine of History and Biography. 80 (4). Historical Society of Pennsylvania: 478–492. ISSN 0031-4587. JSTOR 20088910.
- Hart, Albert Bushnell (October 1915). "American Historical Liars". Harper's Magazine: 726–735.
- Morison, Samuel E. (1959). John Paul Jones: A Sailor's Biography. Boston: Little Brown & Co.
- Felton, Silas (9 July 1993). "Pursuing the Elusive 'Cannoneer". Gettysburg Magazine.
- Felton, Silas (19 July 1998). "Postscript to: Pursuing the Elusive 'Cannoneer". Gettysburg Magazine.
- Bogle, Lori Lyn; Holwitt, Joel L. (April 2004). "The Best Quote Jones Never Wrote". Naval History: 18–23.
