= Patrick Regan (Medal of Honor, 1873) =

American sailor and Medal of Honor recipient

- Born: 1852; Cobh, Ireland
- Died: Unknown
- Military career
- Allegiance: United States
- Branch: United States Navy
- Rank: Ordinary Seaman
- Unit: USS Pensacola
- Awards: Medal of Honor

Patrick Regan (born 1852, date of death unknown) was a United States Navy sailor and a recipient of the United States military's highest decoration, the Medal of Honor.

== Biography ==
Born in 1852 in Cobh (then known as Queenstown), Ireland, Regan immigrated to the United States and was living in New York City when he joined the U.S. Navy. He served as an ordinary seaman on the USS Pensacola.

On the morning of 30 July 1873, Pensacola was in the harbor of Coquimbo, Chile, when a northerly gale began. During the high winds, one of Regan's crewmates, Ordinary Seaman Peter Linguist, fell into the water while trying to re-board the ship from a small boat. When he resurfaced, his head struck the boat and he was knocked unconscious. Wearing heavy clothing and boots, Linguist quickly began to sink. Regan witnessed the event from the ship's gun deck and, when he realized the sailor was drowning, jumped through a porthole and rescued him. Pensacola's captain, John H. Upshur, sent word of Regan's act to his superiors that very day, and Regan was notified two months later, on 6 October, that he would be awarded the Medal of Honor.

Regan's official Medal of Honor citation reads:

Serving on board the U.S.S. Pensacola, Regan displayed gallant conduct in the harbor of Coquimbo, Chile, 30 July 1873.

== See also ==
- List of Medal of Honor recipients during peacetime
