= USS Wissahickon (1861) =

Gunboat of the United States Navy

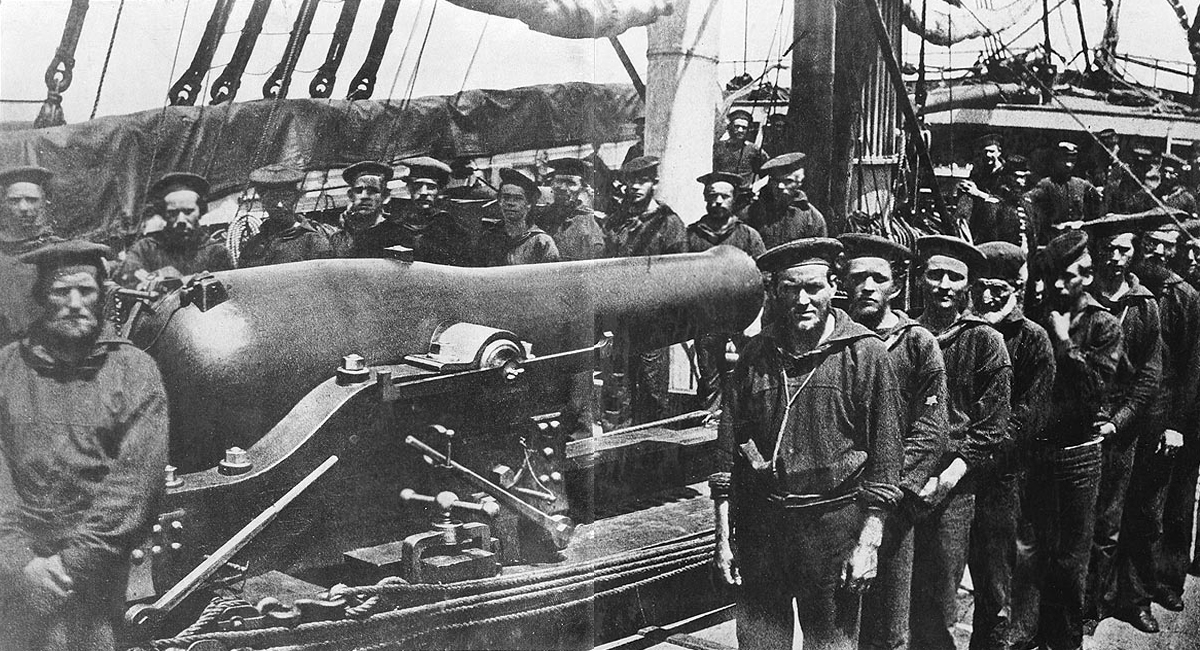
- Crewmembers of USS Wissahickon by the ship's 11 in (280 mm) Dahlgren gun.

History

United States
- Name: USS Wissahickon
- Namesake: Wissahickon Creek
- Commissioned: November 1861
- Decommissioned: July 1865

General characteristics
- Class & type: Unadilla-class gunboat
- Displacement: 691 tons
- Tons burthen: 507
- Length: 158 ft (48 m) (waterline)
- Beam: 28 ft (8.5 m)
- Draft: 9 ft 6 in (2.90 m) (max.)
- Depth of hold: 12 ft (3.7 m)
- Propulsion: 2 × 200 IHP 30-in bore by 18 in stroke horizontal back-acting engines; single screw
- Sail plan: Two-masted schooner
- Speed: 10 kn (11.5 mph)
- Complement: 114
- Armament: Original: 1 × 11-in Dahlgren smoothbore; 2 × 24-pdr smoothbore; 2 × 20-pdr Parrott rifle

USS Wissahickon was a Unadilla-class gunboat that was built for service with the United States Navy during the American Civil War.

== History ==
Wissahickon was built at Philadelphia, Pennsylvania. Commissioned in November 1861, she initially served in the Gulf of Mexico and on the Mississippi River, where in April–July 1862 she participated in the capture of New Orleans, bombardment of Grand Gulf, two runs past the Confederate fortifications commanding the river at Vicksburg and a battle with the ironclad CSS Arkansas.

After repairs at Philadelphia from August–October 1862, Wissahickon joined the blockade of the coasts of South Carolina, Georgia and eastern Florida. She took part in bombardments of Fort McAllister, Georgia, in late 1862-early 1863 and in the destruction of the privateer Rattlesnake (ex-CSS Nashville) on 28 February 1863. One of her sailors, Captain of the Forecastle Henry Shutes, was awarded the Medal of Honor for his part in the action at Fort McAllister and the earlier Battle of Forts Jackson and St. Philip. In March–June 1863, Wissahickon destroyed one blockade runner (the SS Georgiana) and helped to destroy another. During the summer, she bombarded Forts Wagner and Sumter, off Charleston, South Carolina.

Wissahickon spent the rest of the Civil War patrolling off South Carolina and in expeditions into the inland waters of that state and Georgia. She went to New York in June 1865, after the end of hostilities, and was decommissioned there at the beginning of July. Wissahickon was sold in October 1865 and soon became a merchant vessel under the name Adele. She was employed in commercial service for some 20 more years.

== See also ==
- Union Navy
- Union Blockade
