= Thomas Cripps =

Thomas H. Cripps
- Civil War era Navy Medal of Honor
- Born: November 29, 1840; Philadelphia, Pennsylvania
- Died: December 4, 1906 (aged 66); Philadelphia, Pennsylvania
- Military career
- Allegiance: United States of America
- Branch: United States Navy
- Rank: Quartermaster
- Conflicts: American Civil War
- Awards: Medal of Honor

Thomas H. Cripps (November 29, 1840 – December 4, 1906) was a native of Philadelphia, Pennsylvania who was awarded the U.S. Medal of Honor during the American Civil War. While serving in the Union Navy as a quartermaster aboard the USS Richmond, he operated one of that's ship's guns under heavy enemy fire for two hours during the Battle of Mobile Bay, Alabama on August 5, 1864, helping to damage the CSS Tennessee and destroy artillery batteries of the Confederate States Army at Fort Morgan, even as the enemy's shell and shot damaged his ship and killed several of his fellow crewmen. For those actions, he was awarded his nation's highest honor for bravery on December 31, 1864.

== Formative years and early military service ==
Thomas H. Cripps was born on November 28, 1840, in Philadelphia, Pennsylvania. He was just 14 years old when he first enlisted with the U.S. Navy on May 14, 1855. Assigned as a 3rd class apprentice on the USS Union from that time until June 5, he was then transferred to: the USS North Carolina, where he served until July 21, 1856: to the USS Supply, where he served until February 24, 1857; and to the USS North Carolina, where he served as a 2nd class apprentice until March 26, 1857. From there, he was transferred again to: the USS Supply, where he served until August 20, 1857. During this assignment, he was injured on duty. A letter submitted in support of his naval pension by the Office of the U.S. Surgeon General in 1902 described what happened:

"SUPPLY:—

Admitted June 9, 1857. Vulnus laceratum (left hand).

Medical Journal states: "Origin in the line of duty. The first finger of left hand jammed between rack while passing in ballast, in which act the fleshy part of the ball of the finger was torn off".

Discharged June 30, 1857 to duty.

Next transferred to the USS North Carolina, he served there until November 20, 1857, when he was transferred to the USS Supply, where he served until he was honorably discharged on August 8, 1858.

== Civil War ==
In response to President Abraham Lincoln's call for volunteers to help preserve America's union following the fall of Fort Sumter to Confederate States Army troops in April 1861, Thomas H. Cripps re-enlisted for military service during the fall of that year. According to service record summaries prepared for him by the U.S. Treasury Department in 1892 and 1898, Cripps enlisted on November 29, 1861, and was assigned as a seaman to the USS Ohio until December 3 when he was transferred to the USS Princeton, where he served until December 22, when he was transferred to the USS Brooklyn.

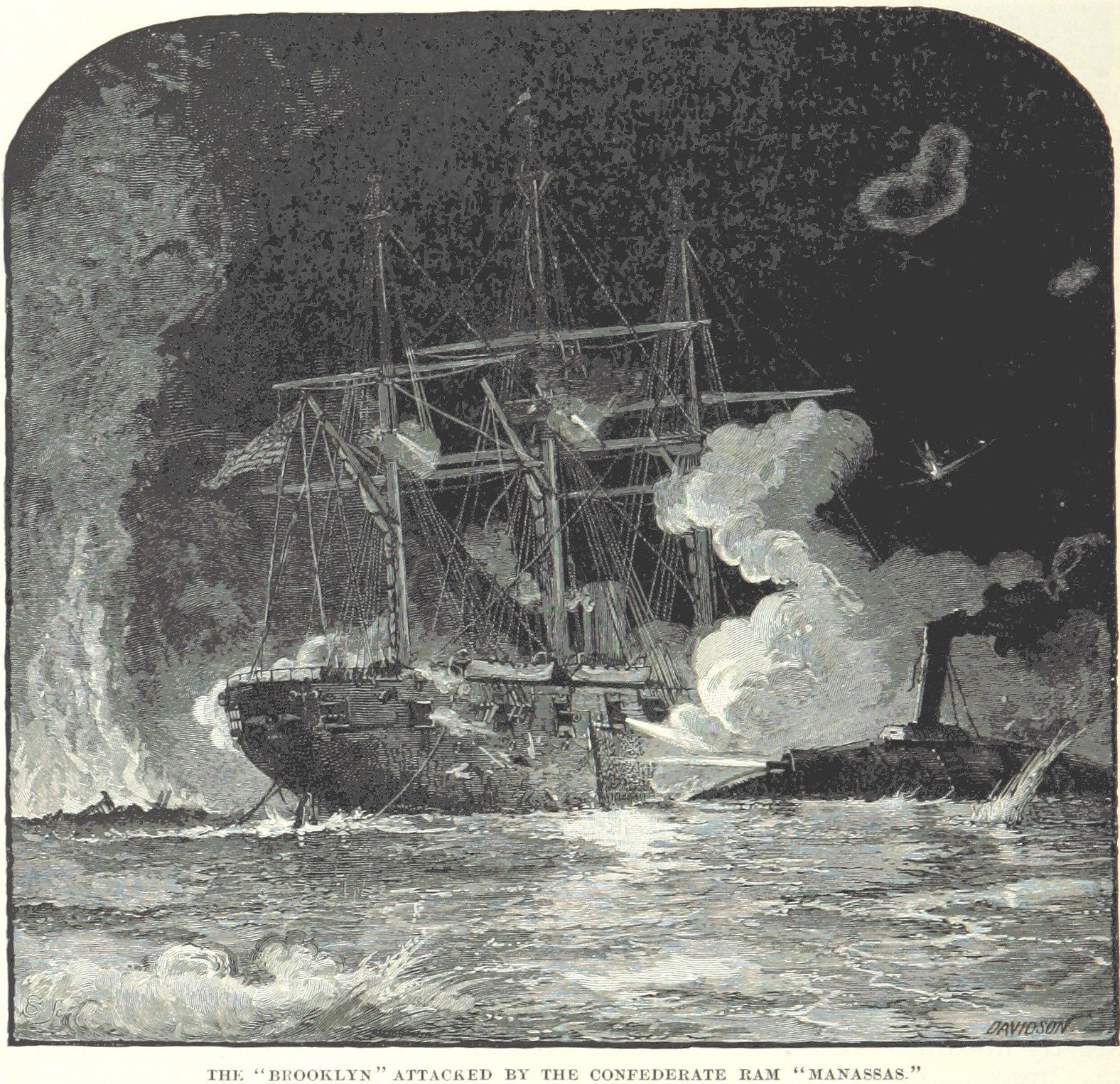
CSS Manassas attacking the USS Brooklyn during the Battle of Forts St. Philip and Jackson, April 1862.

While serving aboard the USS Brooklyn in 1862, Cripps participated with his shipmates in the Union Navy's attacks on Fort St. Philip, Fort Jackson and the Chalmette batteries in Louisiana under the command of Admiral David Farragut from April 16 to 28. Also present for the resulting surrender of New Orleans to Union forces, he and his shipmates then also engaged with other Union forces in the attack on Vicksburg, Mississippi in late June and early July that same year.

In September 1863, Cripps transferred to the USS Richmond. Still attached to Farragut's squadron, his ship and others from the Union Navy were subsequently ordered to initiate a blockade of Mobile, Alabama beginning November 1. Less than a year later, he performed the actions for which he would later be awarded the U.S. Medal of Honor. Quartermaster of the USS Richmond, he captained a gun during the Battle of Mobile Bay during the morning of August 5, 1864 and, while under heavy enemy fire which damaged his ship and killed several of his fellow crewmen, displayed "coolness and good conduct" as he continued firing for two hours, helping to damage the CSS Tennessee and destroy the batteries at Fort Morgan.

Afterward, he and his Richmond shipmates continued to occupy Mobile Bay. Cripps was then honorably discharged from the U.S. Navy on November 30, 1864 (alternate discharge date November 1, 1865).

== Post-war life ==
Following his honorable discharge from the U.S. Navy, Thomas Cripps returned home to Philadelphia, where, on May 16, 1866, he wed Mary Lattimer (1848–1891). By 1880, he was working as a wagon driver and living with his wife, Mary, on Washington Avenue in Philadelphia. Four years later, on July 5, 1884, their son Joseph H. Cripps was born.

Preceded in death by his wife in 1891, Cripps lived to see the turn of the century but, after developing pleurisy on October 1, 1906, succumbed from complications. Following his death in Philadelphia, Pennsylvania on December 4, 1906, he was laid to rest at The Woodlands Cemetery in Philadelphia on December 8.

== Medal of Honor citation ==
Per General Order No. 45, issued by the U.S. War Department on December 31, 1864:

The President of the United States of America, in the name of Congress, takes pleasure in presenting the Medal of Honor to Quartermaster Thomas H. Cripps, United States Navy, for extraordinary heroism in action, serving as Captain of a gun on board the U.S.S. Richmond during action against rebel forts and gunboats and with the ram Tennessee in Mobile Bay, Alabama, August 5, 1864. Despite damage to his ship and the loss of several men on board as enemy fire raked her decks, Quartermaster Cripps fought his gun with skill and courage throughout a furious two-hour battle which resulted in the surrender of the rebel ram Tennessee and in the damaging and destruction of batteries at Fort Morgan.

== See also ==
- James Martin II
- List of Medal of Honor recipients
- List of American Civil War Medal of Honor recipients: A–F
- Mobile, Alabama in the American Civil War
- New Orleans in the American Civil War
- Pennsylvania in the American Civil War
