= Albert Beyer =

United States Navy Medal of Honor recipient (1859–1929)

Albert E Beyer
- Born: June 13, 1859; Hannover, Kingdom of Hanover
- Died: October 29, 1929 (aged 70); Philadelphia, Pennsylvania, US
- Burial place: Mount Moriah Cemetery (Philadelphia)
- Military career
- Allegiance: United States of America
- Branch: United States Navy
- Service years: 1898–?
- Rank: Coxswain
- Unit: USS Nashville (PG-7)
- Conflicts: Spanish–American War: Battle of Cienfuegos
- Awards: Medal of Honor

Albert E Beyer (June 13, 1859 – October 29, 1929) was a United States Navy Coxswain who received the Medal of Honor for actions during the Battle of Cienfuegos during the Spanish–American War. He was one of 52 sailors and marines awarded the medal for actions during that battle. Albert is buried in the Mount Moriah Cemetery in Yeadon, Pennsylvania, in the Naval Asylum plot.

== Medal of Honor citation ==
Rank and Organization: Coxswain, United States Navy. Born: June 13, 1859, Hanover, Germany. Entered Service At: Boston, Mass. G.O. No.: 521, July 7, 1899.

Citation:

On board the U.S.S. Nashville during the cutting of the cable leading from Cienfuegos, Cuba, May 11, 1898. Facing the heavy fire of the enemy, Beyer set an example of extraordinary bravery and coolness throughout this action.

== See also ==
- List of Medal of Honor recipients for the Spanish–American War
