= James McLeod (Medal of Honor) =

Union Navy sailor in the American Civil War

- Civil War era Navy Medal of Honor
- Born: varying 1836 to 1840 recorded on ten Naval enlistments Glasgow, Scotland
- Died: June 5, 1898 either on the hospital ship USS Solace (AH-2) or at the Brooklyn Naval Hospital
- Burial place: Cypress Hills National Cemetery, Brooklyn, New York City
- Military career
- Allegiance: United States of America; Union
- Branch: United States Navy; Union Navy
- Service years: 1861 - 1898
- Rank: Captain of the Foretop
- Units: (United States Navy) USS Colorado (United States Navy) USS Pensacola
- Conflicts: American Civil War • Battle of Forts Jackson and St. Philip
- Awards: Medal of Honor

James McLeod (b. 1836 to 1840 - d. June 5, 1898) was a Union Navy sailor in the American Civil War and a recipient of a Medal of Honor (the U.S. military's highest decoration), for his actions at the Battle of Forts Jackson and St. Philip.

== Military service ==
Born in Glasgow, Scotland, McLeod immigrated to the United States and was living in Bucksport, Maine when he joined the U.S. Navy. He served during the Civil War as a captain of the foretop on the USS Colorado. At the Battle of Forts Jackson and St. Philip near New Orleans on April 24, 1862, he volunteered to join the USS Pensacola as captain of the aft howitzer gun and performed this duty "with great ability and activity". For this action, he was awarded the Medal of Honor a year later on April 3, 1863.

== Medal of Honor citation ==
Rank and organization: Captain of the Foretop, U.S. Navy. Born: Scotland. Accredited to: Maine. G.O. No.: 11, 3 April 1863.

McLeod's official Medal of Honor citation reads:

Captain of foretop, and a volunteer from the Colorado, McLeod served on board the U.S.S. Pensacola during the attack upon Forts Jackson and St. Philip and the taking of New Orleans, 24 and 25 April 1862. Acting as gun captain of the rifled howitzer aft which was much exposed, he served this piece with great ability and activity, although no officer superintended it.
