= Moses Orr =

United States Army Medal of Honor recipient (1847–1897)

- Born: 1847; County Tyrone, Ireland
- Died: May 10, 1897 (aged 50); Philadelphia, Pennsylvania, U.S.
- Burial place: Mount Moriah Cemetery
- Military career
- Allegiance: United States
- Branch: United States Army
- Service years: c. 1872 – 1875
- Rank: Private
- Unit: 1st U.S. Cavalry
- Conflicts: Indian Wars; Apache Wars
- Awards: Medal of Honor

Moses Orr (1847—May 10, 1897) was an Irish-born soldier in the U.S. Army who served with the 1st U.S. Cavalry during the Apache Wars. He was one of several men who received the Medal of Honor for gallantry during Lieutenant Colonel George Crook's "winter campaign" against the Apache Indians in the Arizona Territory during 1872 and 1873.

== Biography ==
Moses Orr was born in County Tyrone, Ireland in 1847. He later emigrated to the United States and enlisted in the U.S. Army in Philadelphia. Orr was assigned to Company A of the 1st U.S. Cavalry and took part in the Apache Wars during the 1870s. He served under Lieutenant Colonel George Crook's during his "winter campaign" against the Apache Indians in the Arizona Territory during 1872 and 1873. Orr was among the member of his regiment to receive the Medal of Honor for "gallant conduct during campaigns and engagements with the Apaches" on April 12, 1875. He returned to Philadelphia after leaving the military and died there on May 10, 1897, at the age of 50. Orr was buried at Mount Moriah Cemetery.

== Medal of Honor citation ==
Rank and organization: Private, Company A, 1st U.S. Cavalry. Place and date: Winter of 1872–73. Entered service at:------. Birth: Ireland Date of issue: 12 April 1875.

Citation:

Gallant conduct during campaigns and engagements with Apaches.

== See also ==
- List of Medal of Honor recipients for the Indian Wars
