= William Thompson (Medal of Honor, 1861) =

American sailor

- Civil War era Navy Medal of Honor
- Born: c. 1812; Cape May County, New Jersey, US
- Died: September 12, 1872; Philadelphia Naval Asylum, Philadelphia, Pennsylvania, US
- Burial place: Mount Moriah Cemetery
- Military career
- Allegiance: United States of America
- Branch: United States Navy
- Rank: Signal Quartermaster
- Unit: USS Mohican
- Conflicts: American Civil War
- Awards: Medal of Honor

William Thompson (c. 1812 – September 12, 1872) was an American sailor who was a Signal Quartermaster in the American Civil War and recipient of the Medal of Honor for action at Forts Beauregard and Walker on Hilton Head, South Carolina, on November 7, 1861. He was wounded by a piece of shell which caused his legs to be amputated.
