= Henry Shutes =

- Born: c. 1804; Baltimore, Maryland, US
- Died: September 10, 1889 (aged 84–85)
- Burial place: Mount Moriah Cemetery, Philadelphia, Pennsylvania
- Military career
- Allegiance: United States
- Branch: United States Navy
- Rank: Captain of the Forecastle
- Units: USS Don; USS Wissahickon
- Conflicts: American Civil War • Battle of Forts Jackson and St. Philip
- Awards: Medal of Honor

Henry Shutes (c. 1804 – September 10, 1889) was a Union Navy sailor in the American Civil War and a recipient of the U.S. military's highest decoration, the Medal of Honor, for his actions at the Battle of Forts Jackson and St. Philip and an 1863 engagement with Fort McAllister, Georgia.

Born in about 1804 in Baltimore, Maryland, Shutes was still living in that city when he joined the Navy. He served during the Civil War as a gunner's mate on the USS Don and later as a captain of the forecastle on the USS Wissahickon. Aboard Wissahickon, he "performed his duties with skill and courage" at the Battle of Forts Jackson and St. Philip near New Orleans on April 24, 1862, and during an engagement with Fort McAllister, Georgia, on February 27, 1863. He helped save his ship in the Fort McAllister action when Wissahickon's gunpowder magazine was struck by shellfire. For these actions, he was awarded the Medal of Honor on January 15, 1866. Aged 57 or 58 when the engagements for which he was recognized began, Shutes was the oldest Medal of Honor recipient of the Civil War.

Shutes's official Medal of Honor citation reads:

Served as captain of the forecastle on board the U.S.S. Wissahickon during the battle of New Orleans, 24 and 25 April 1862; and in the engagement at Fort McAllister, 27 February 1863. Going on board the U.S.S. Wissahickon from the U.S.S. Don where his seamanlike qualities as gunner's mate were outstanding, Shutes performed his duties with skill and courage. Showing a presence of mind and prompt action when a shot from Fort McAllister penetrated the Wissahickon below the water line and entered the powder magazine, Shutes contributed materially to the preservation of the powder and safety of the ship.

Shutes died on September 10, 1889, at age 84 or 85 and was buried at Mount Moriah Cemetery in Philadelphia, Pennsylvania.
