= Thomas S. Flood (Medal of Honor) =

United States Navy sailor and Medal of Honor recipient

- Born: 1840; Ireland
- Died: Unknown
- Military career
- Allegiance: United States
- Branch: United States Navy
- Rank: Boy
- Unit: (United States Navy) USS Pensacola
- Conflicts: American Civil War • Battle of Forts Jackson and St. Philip
- Awards: Medal of Honor

Thomas S. Flood (born 1840, date of death unknown) was a Union Navy sailor in the American Civil War and a recipient of the U.S. military's highest decoration, the Medal of Honor, for his actions at the Battle of Forts Jackson and St. Philip.

Born in 1840 in Ireland, Flood immigrated to the United States and was living in New York when he joined the U.S. Navy. He served during the Civil War on the USS Pensacola. At the Battle of Forts Jackson and St. Philip near New Orleans on April 24–25, 1862, he stood on Pensacola's bridge and acted as an aide to the executive officer, F.A. Roe. An artillery shell struck nearby, knocking Flood off the bridge onto the deck below and removing the leg of Signal Quartermaster Murry. Flood helped Murry below decks to the surgeon, then returned to the bridge and took over the man's duties. In his report of the battle, Roe praised Flood's actions and suggested he be appointed a midshipman. For his part in the battle, Flood was awarded the Medal of Honor a year later on April 3, 1863.

== Citation ==
Flood's official Medal of Honor citation follows. The sentence at the end of the citation is from Roe's after action report.

The President of the United States of America, in the name of Congress, takes pleasure in presenting the Medal of Honor to Boy Thomas S. Flood, United States Navy, for extraordinary heroism in action while serving on board the U.S.S. Pensacola in the attack on Forts Jackson and St. Philip, Louisiana, and at the taking of New Orleans, 24 and 25 April 1862. Swept from the bridge by a shell which wounded the Signal Quartermaster, Navy Boy Thomas Flood returned to the bridge after assisting the wounded man below and taking over his duties, performed them with coolness, exactitude and the fidelity of a veteran Seaman. His intelligence and character cannot be spoken of too warmly.
