= USS Pensacola (1859) =

Gunboat of the United States Navy

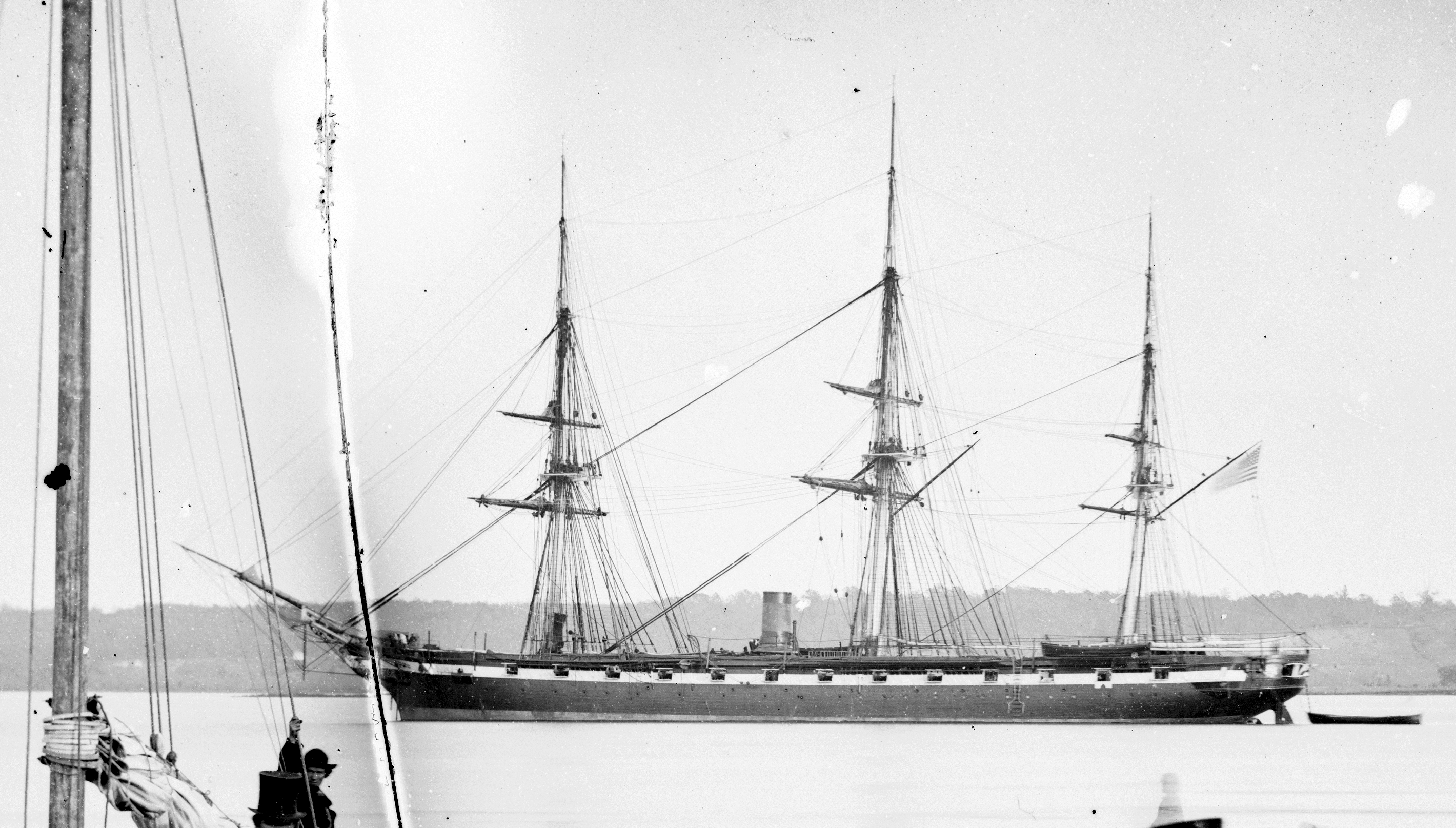
- Pensacola in Alexandria, Virginia, 1861

History

United States
- Name: USS Pensacola
- Builder: Pensacola Navy Yard, completed at Washington Navy Yard
- Launched: 15 August 1859
- Commissioned: 5 December 1859
- Decommissioned: 31 January 1860
- Recommissioned: 16 September 1861
- Decommissioned: 29 April 1864
- Recommissioned: 16 August 1866
- Decommissioned: 23 May 1884
- Recommissioned: 16 August 1866
- Decommissioned: 23 May 1884
- Recommissioned: 4 April 1885
- Decommissioned: 18 April 1892
- Recommissioned: 22 November 1898
- Decommissioned: 31 May 1899
- Recommissioned: 14 July 1901
- Decommissioned: 6 December 1911
- Stricken: 23 December 1911
- Fate: Burned and sunk May 1912

General characteristics
- Type: Screw steamer
- Tonnage: 3000
- Length: 230 ft 5 in (70.23 m)
- Beam: 44 ft 5 in (13.54 m)
- Draft: 18 ft 7 in (5.66 m)
- Propulsion: Steam engine and sail
- Speed: 9.5 knots (17.6 km/h; 10.9 mph)
- Armament: 1871; 2 × 11 in (280 mm) Dahlgren smoothbore gun; 18 × 9 in (230 mm) Dahlgren smoothbore guns; 2 × 60-pounder muzzle-loading rifles

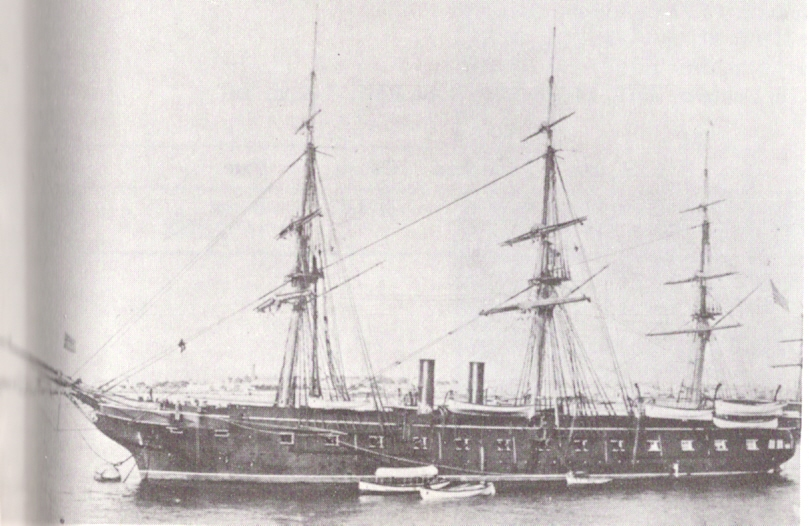
USS Pensacola at Alexandria, Virginia, in 1886.

The first USS Pensacola was a screw steamer that served in the United States Navy during the U.S. Civil War.

== Construction and commissioning ==
Pensacola was launched by the Pensacola Navy Yard on August 15, 1859, and commissioned there on December 5, 1859, for towing to Washington Navy Yard for installation of machinery. She was decommissioned January 31, 1860, and commissioned in full on September 16, 1861, Captain Henry W. Morris in command.

== Service history ==
=== Civil War, 1862–1864 ===
Pensacola departed Alexandria, Virginia on January 11, 1862, for the Gulf of Mexico to join Admiral David Farragut's newly created West Gulf Blockading Squadron. She steamed with that fleet in the historic dash past Confederate Fort St. Philip and Fort Jackson which protected New Orleans, Louisiana on April 24. The next day, Pensacola engaged batteries below that great Confederate metropolis. On April 26, a landing party of Marines raised the United States flag over the mint at New Orleans. Four of her sailors were awarded the Medal of Honor for their part in the battle: Boy Thomas Flood, Seaman Thomas Lyons, Captain of the Foretop James McLeod, and Quartermaster Louis Richards.

During the next two years, she helped guard the lower Mississippi River, returning to New York Navy Yard where she decommissioned April 29, 1864, for the installation of new and improved machinery originally intended for the cancelled sloop-of-war USS Wanaloset.

=== Pacific Squadron, 1866–1884 ===
Recommissioned August 16, 1866, Pensacola sailed around Cape Horn to join the Pacific Squadron, serving from time to time as flagship. Her cruising ranged from Chile to Puget Sound and west to Hawaii. While in the harbor of Coquimbo, Chile, on 30 July 1873, Ordinary Seaman Patrick Regan jumped overboard and rescued a drowning shipmate, for which he was later awarded the Medal of Honor. But for two periods in ordinary, February 15, 1870, to October 14, 1871, and December 31, 1873, to July 13, 1874, Pensacola continued this duty until detached from the Pacific squadron in June 1883. Departing Callao, Peru on July 18, she sailed west across the Pacific and Indian Oceans, transited the Suez Canal, and steamed the length of the Mediterranean Sea before crossing the Atlantic to arrive in Hampton Roads on May 4, 1884. She decommissioned at Norfolk, Virginia on May 23.

=== Atlantic and Pacific, 1885–1892 ===
Recommissioned April 4, 1885, Pensacola, under the command of then Captain George Dewey, operated in European waters until returning to Norfolk in February 1888 for repairs. On April 7, 1889, she sank at Portsmouth Navy Yard when a drydock was inundated during a storm. Operations along the Atlantic Coast and a cruise along the coast of Africa ended when the ship returned to New York in May 1890. In August she headed back to familiar haunts in the Pacific, arriving in San Francisco on August 10, 1891. Following a visit to Hawaii, she decommissioned at Mare Island on April 18, 1892.

=== Training and receiving ship, 1898–1911 ===
Recommissioned on November 22, 1898, Pensacola served as a training ship for Naval apprentices until going back into ordinary on May 31, 1899. She was back in commission July 14, 1901, subsequently used as receiving ship at Yerba Buena Training Station, San Francisco until finally decommissioning on December 6, 1911, and struck from the Navy Register on December 23. She was burned and sunk by the Navy in San Francisco Bay near Hunters Point early in May 1912.

== See also ==
- Union Navy
