= Louis Richards =

- Born: c. 1835; New York City
- Died: January 7, 1894 (aged 58–59)
- Burial place: Brooklyn, New York City
- Military career
- Allegiance: United States
- Branch: United States Navy
- Rank: Quartermaster
- Unit: (United States Navy) USS Pensacola
- Conflicts: American Civil War • Battle of Forts Jackson and St. Philip
- Awards: Medal of Honor

Louis or Lewis Richards (c. 1835 – January 7, 1894) was a Union Navy sailor in the American Civil War and a recipient of the U.S. military's highest decoration, the Medal of Honor, for his actions at the Battle of Forts Jackson and St. Philip.

Born in about 1835 in New York City, Richards was still living in the state of New York when he joined the Navy. He served during the Civil War as a quartermaster on the USS Pensacola. At the Battle of Forts Jackson and St. Philip near New Orleans on April 24, 1862, he successfully steered his ship through obstacles placed in the Mississippi River by the Confederates. For this action, he was awarded the Medal of Honor a year later on April 3, 1863.

Richards's official Medal of Honor citation reads:

Richards served as quartermaster on board the U.S.S. Pensacola in the attack upon Forts Jackson and St. Philip, and at the taking of New Orleans, 24 and 25 April 1862. Through all the din and roar of battle, he steered the ship through the narrow opening of the barricade, and his attention to orders contributed to the successful passage of the ship without once fouling the shore or the obstacles of the barricade.

Richards died on January 7, 1894, at age 58 or 59 and was buried in Brooklyn, New York City.
