= August P. Teytand =

- Born: April 6, 1878; Santa Cruz, West Indies
- Died: March 4, 1956 (aged 77); Philadelphia, Pennsylvania, US
- Burial place: Mount Moriah Cemetery Philadelphia, Pennsylvania
- Military career
- Allegiance: United States
- Branch: United States Navy
- Rank: Quartermaster Third Class
- Units: USS Olympia; USS Leyden
- Conflicts: Spanish–American War; *Battle of Manila Bay
- Awards: Medal of Honor

August P. Teytand (April 6, 1878 – March 4, 1956) was a United States Navy sailor and a recipient of the United States military's highest decoration, the Medal of Honor for his actions aboard the USS Leyden.

After immigrating to the United States from the West Indies and joined the Navy. He served aboard several ships including USS Olympia and USS Leyden. While serving aboard Olympia he traveled to Asia and participated in the Battle of Manila Bay during the Spanish–American War. He was a member of the crew of Leyden as well when it foundered in a heavy fog and sank. It was for his actions during the wreck of Leyden that he received the Medal of Honor. He died in 1956 and is buried in Mount Moriah Cemetery in Philadelphia, Pennsylvania.

== Early life and military ==
Teytand was born April 6, 1878, in Santa Cruz, West Indies and after immigrating to the United States joined the Navy. He was an apprentice first class stationed aboard USS Olympia, a protected cruiser, when it departed Mare Island on August 25, 1895, and joined the Asiatic Fleet. Olympia was designated as the flagship for the fleet upon its arrival and for the next three years Teytand cruised the Far East, visiting Japan, China, and the Philippines. On January 3, 1898 Commodore George Dewey took command of the fleet in anticipation of a pending war with Spain. The fleet waited in Hong Kong through the winter and on April 25, 1898, word was received that the United States declared war with Spain. With this news the fleet moved to Mirs Bay, China.

On the morning of May 1, 1898, Commodore Dewey gave the order to enter Manila Bay and confront the Spanish flotilla commanded by Rear Admiral Patricio Montojo. At approximately 05:40, Dewey ordered Olympia's captain to open fire on the Spanish ships and the coastal batteries. Teytand and the other sailors aboard Olympia fired the first shots of the engagement and continued to engage the Spanish ships until the majority of Pasarón's flotilla of ships had been destroyed and then city of Manila surrendered to Dewey and the American forces. After the defeat of the Spanish forces and the surrender of Manila Olympia, Teytand, and the other members of the crew remained in the area and supported the United States Army by shelling Spanish forces on land.

On May 20, 1899, after completing their mission in the Philippines, Olympia and her crew along with Teytand returned to the Chinese coast. They stayed in China for a month and then they returned to the United States, via the Suez Canal and the Mediterranean Sea. The ship arrived in Boston, Massachusetts, on October 10, 1899.

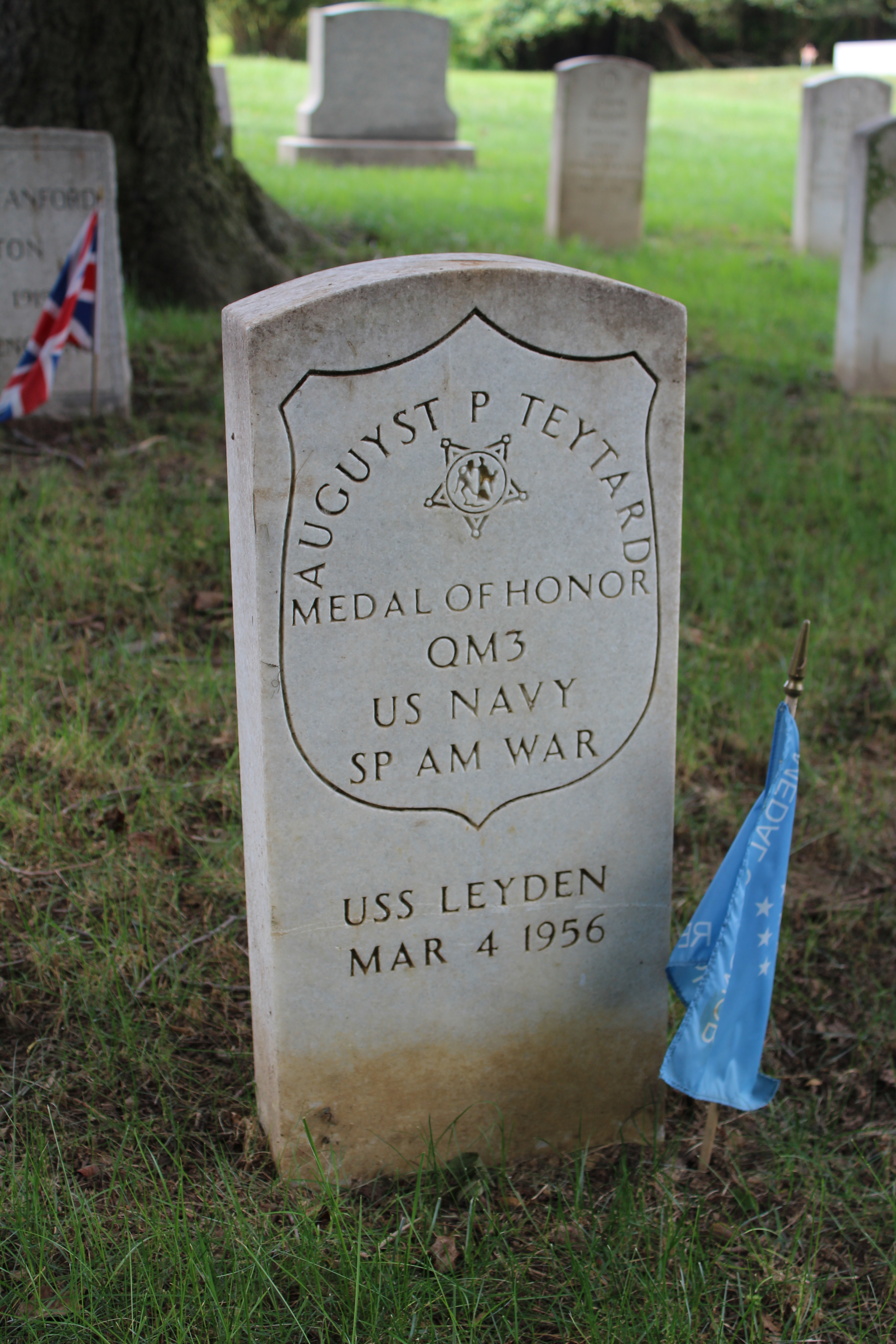
Auguyst P Teytard headstone in Mount Moriah Cemetery Naval Plot

Teytand remained in the navy after the Spanish–American War and on January 21, 1903, he was serving as a quartermaster third class aboard the tugboat USS Leyden. When Leyden was returning from Puerto Rico it foundered near Block Island in a heavy fog and for his actions during the wreck he received the Medal of Honor December 26, 1903. The full Medal of Honor citation reads:

For heroism while serving on board the U.S.S. Leyden at the time of the wreck of that vessel, 21 January 1903.

In 1953 he posed for a picture for Life magazine with 64 other Medal of Honor recipients. The recipients were brought to New York City by Walter Winchell for a fundraiser for the widows and orphans of New York City firemen and policemen.

He died on March 4, 1956, at the Naval Hospital in Philadelphia, Pennsylvania. He is buried at Mount Moriah Cemetery in Philadelphia, Pennsylvania.

== See also ==
- List of Medal of Honor recipients during peacetime
