= City Planning Commission (Philadelphia) =

Governmental body in Philadelphia, Pennsylvania, USA

Philadelphia City Planning Commission
Agency overview
- Jurisdiction: City of Philadelphia, Pennsylvania
- Headquarters: Philadelphia, Pennsylvania
- Employees: 41
- Annual budget: US$280,000 (2016)
- Parent agency: Philadelphia City Council
- Website: City Planning Commission

The City Planning Commission is a governmental body of Philadelphia tasked with guiding the growth and development of the city. The commission is composed of nine members which oversee a number of divisions: The Planning Division, Development Planning Division, Urban Design Division, and Geographic Information Systems Division.
