= 163rd Regiment =

163rd Regiment may refer to:

- 163rd (Mixed) Heavy Anti-Aircraft Regiment, Royal Artillery
- 163rd Infantry Regiment (United States)
- 163rd Regiment Royal Armoured Corps

== American Civil War regiments ==
- 163rd New York Infantry Regiment
- 163rd Ohio Infantry Regiment
