= Victor Vifquain =

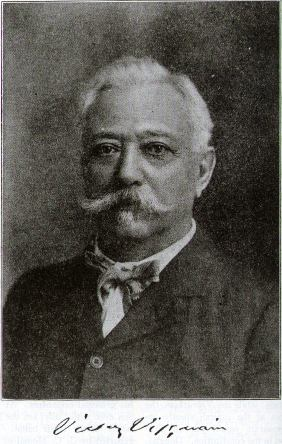
- Born: May 20, 1836; Saint-Josse-ten-Noode, Belgium
- Died: January 7, 1904 (aged 67); Lincoln, Nebraska, US
- Burial place: Calvary Cemetery, Lincoln, Nebraska
- Military career
- Allegiance: United States of America
- Branch: United States Army; Union Army
- Service years: 1861–1865, 1898–1899
- Rank: Colonel; Brevet Brigadier General
- Commands: 97th Illinois Volunteer Infantry Regiment
- Conflicts: American Civil War: Battle of Fort Blakeley; Spanish–American War
- Awards: Medal of Honor
- Other work: The 1862 Plot to Kidnap Jefferson Davis

Jean-Baptiste Victor Vifquain (May 20, 1836 – January 7, 1904) was a Belgian-born veteran of the American Civil War and the Spanish–American War. He was awarded the Medal of Honor for capturing a Confederate flag during the Battle of Fort Blakeley. Following the Civil War, Vifquain was appointed as US consul to Colombia and was inducted into the Order of the Double Dragon for rendering aid to Chinese citizens.

== Early life ==
Vifquain was born as Jean-Baptiste Victor Devuyst in Saint-Josse-ten-Noode, Belgium on May 20, 1836; his parents were not married at the time of his birth, and he was legally recognized by his father in 1845. His father, Jean-Baptiste Joseph Vifquain, was an engineer and served under Napoleon during the Napoleonic Wars. Vifquain received military training at the Royal Military Academy in Brussels, and served in the Belgian Army for a year. In 1857, he moved to the United States and settled in Saline County, Nebraska.

== Civil War ==
Upon the outbreak of the Civil War in 1861, Vifquain joined the 53rd New York Infantry so he would not have to wait for a Nebraska unit to be created. The infantry unit was disbanded before it could become involved in the fighting. Following the disbandment, Vifquain and three colleagues snuck into Richmond in an unsuccessful attempt to kidnap Confederate President Jefferson Davis. In 1862, the governor of Illinois appointed Vifquain to be the Ninety-seventh Illinois's adjutant.

== Battle of Fort Blakeley ==
Vifquain commanded the Ninety-Seventh Illinois during the Battle of Fort Blakeley. On April 9, he advanced towards and jumped onto the parapet of the Confederate fort. Surviving a barrage of Confederate gun fire without serious injury, Vifquain ordered a general charge of the fort by his unit. During the ensuing fighting, Vifquain used his sword to sever the halliard holding up the fort's Confederate flag while the flag-bearer of the Ninety-Seventh Illinois planted the Union flag in its place. The flag-bearer was killed by Confederate gun fire immediately after placing the flag. Vifquain was concealed by the falling Confederate flag during the attack, so he was not targeted. Vifquain survived the battle and was awarded the Medal of Honor for his actions.

== Later life ==
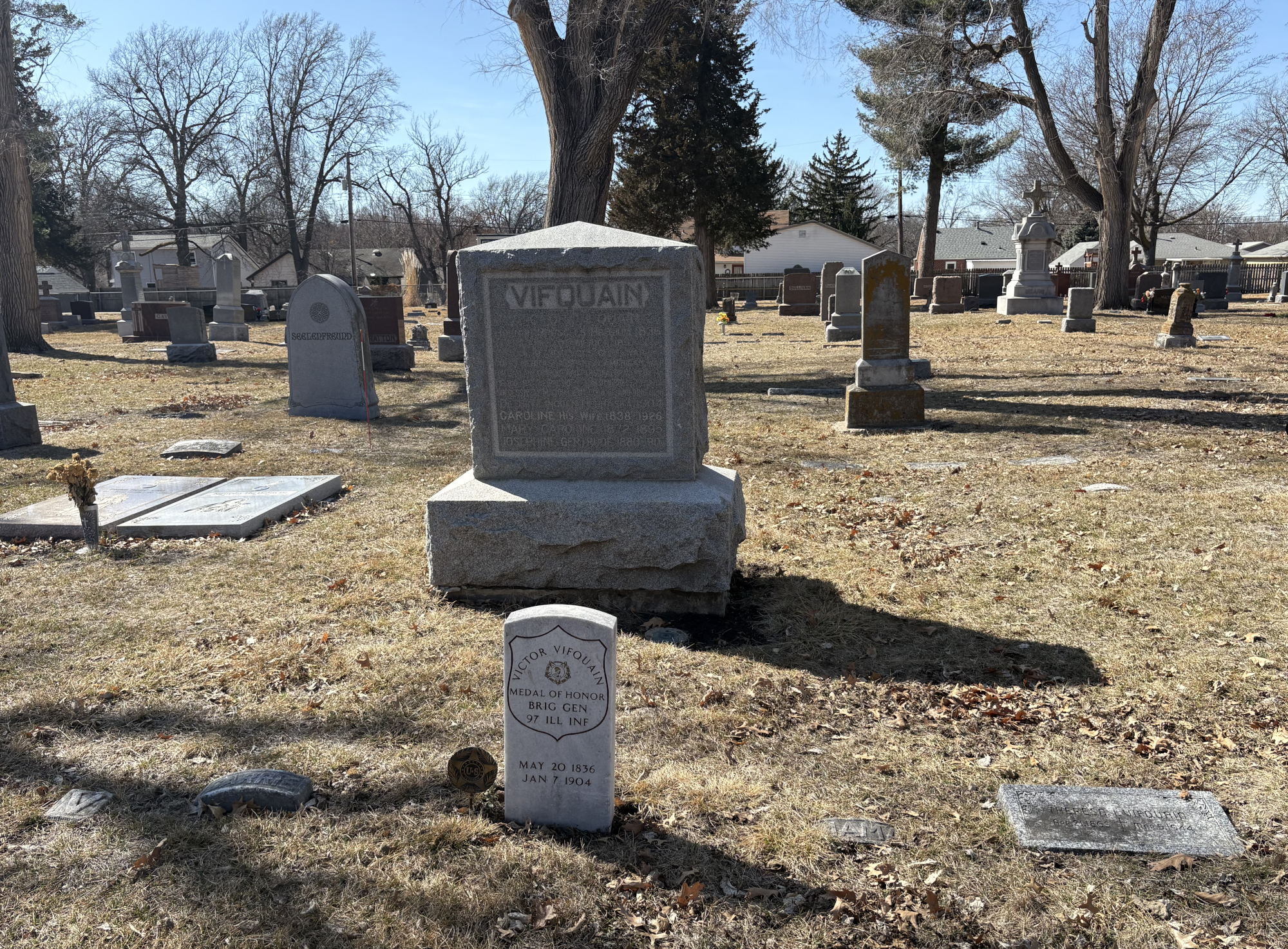
Vifquain's grave at Calvary Catholic Cemetery in Lincoln

Near the end of the Civil War, Vifquain yet again attempted to capture Davis. He successfully captured a train believed to be carrying Davis near Selma, Alabama. Davis was not actually a passenger, but Vifquain was able to secure three-thousand heads of cattle and two-thousand horses from the train. Vifquain ultimately achieved a rank of brevet brigadier general by the time he was mustered out of service in October 1865.

After the end of the Civil War, Vifquain ran for a seat in Congress, but did not win the election. He also attended the Nebraska Constitutional Convention. Vifquain founded the Daily State Democrat in 1879 and was appointed US consul to Columbia by President Grover Cleveland in 1886. He would later serve as the leader of multiple diplomatic posts in Panama. During his time in Panama, Vifquain aided multiple Chinese citizens at the United States consul. As a result of his actions, the Emperor of China inducted Vifquain into the Order of the Double Dragon. In 1891, he was selected to be the adjutant general of his home state of Nebraska.

Vifquain returned to active military service during the Spanish–American War. He served as commander of the 3rd Nebraska Infantry Regiment following the resignation of Colonel William Jennings Bryan. His regiment remained in Cuba at the end of the war to aid in the occupation of the island. Vifquain died in 1904 at his house in Lincoln, Nebraska, and was buried at Calvary Catholic Cemetery. He wrote a memoir near the end of his life, which was published nearly a century after his death.
