= List of New York units in the American Civil War =

The following units served the Union Army during the American Civil War.

== Infantry ==
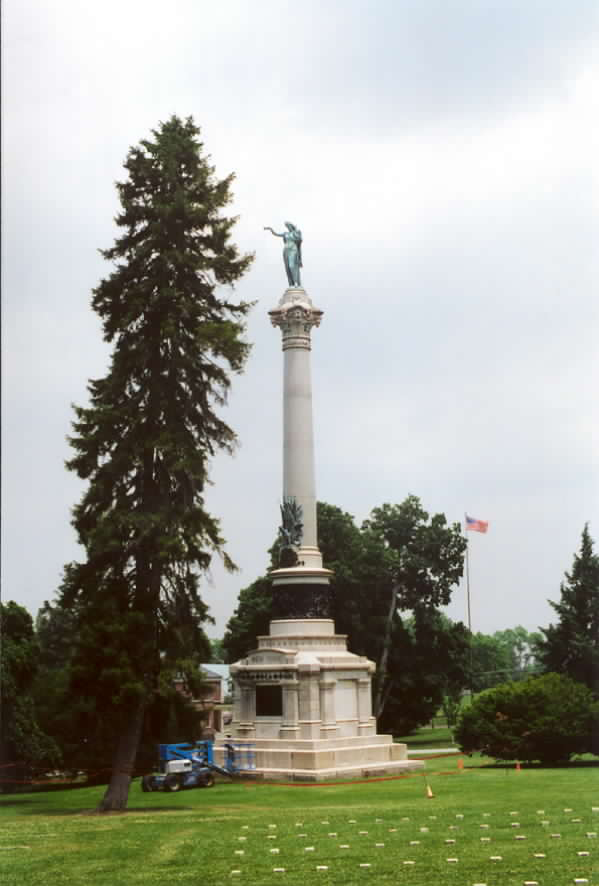
New York Monument at Gettysburg

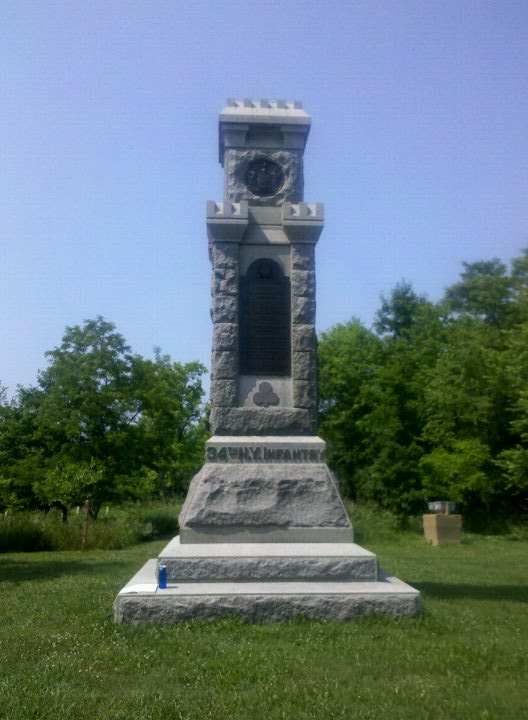
34th NY Infantry Monument at Antietam

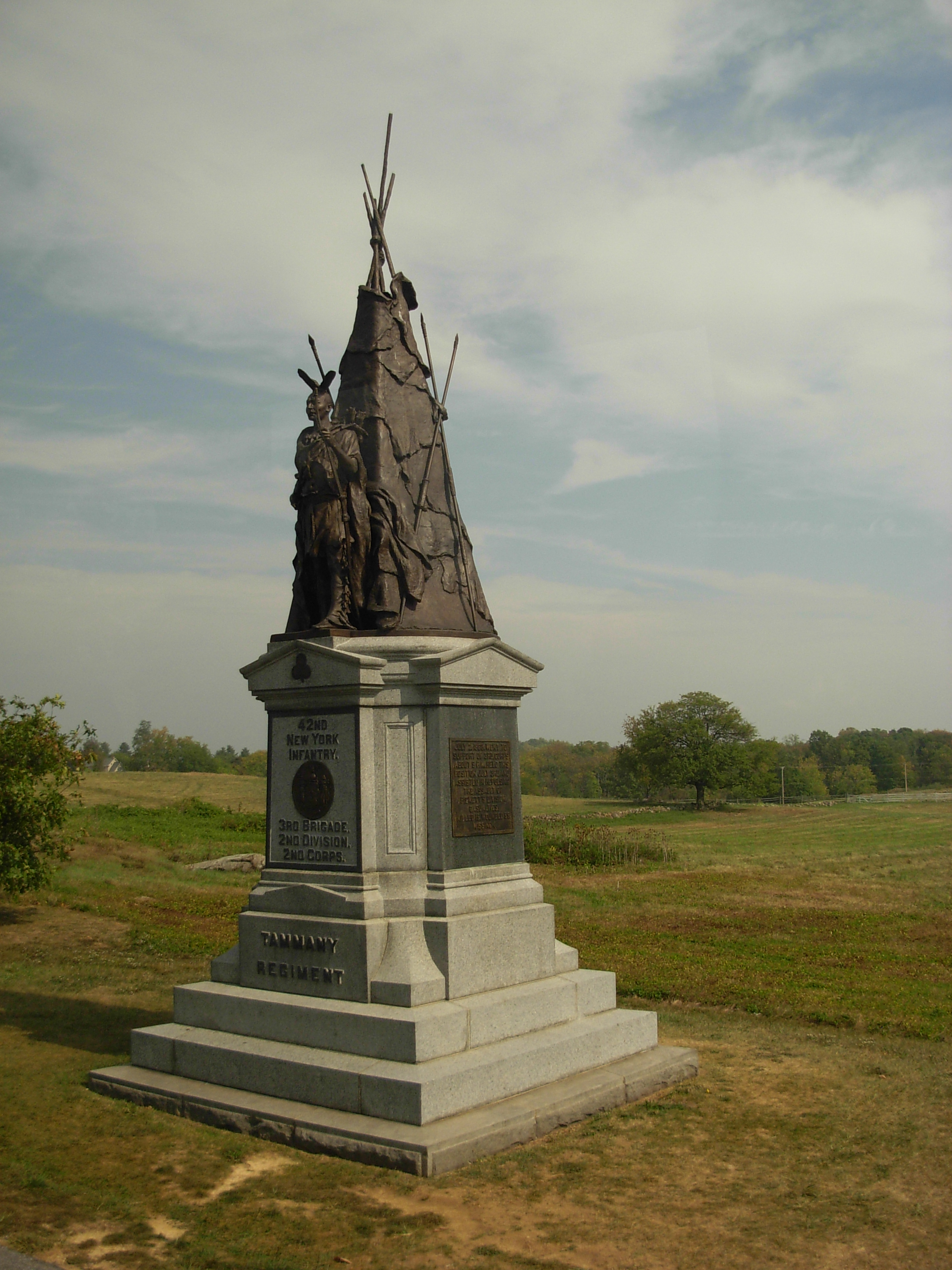
42nd NY Infantry Monument at Gettysburg

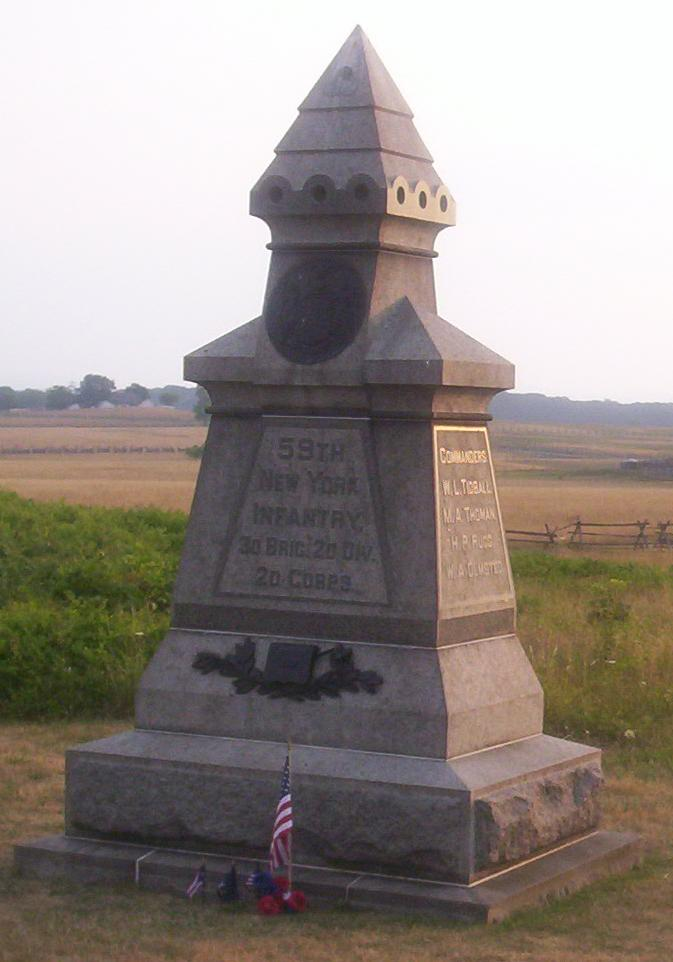
59th NY Infantry Monument at Gettysburg

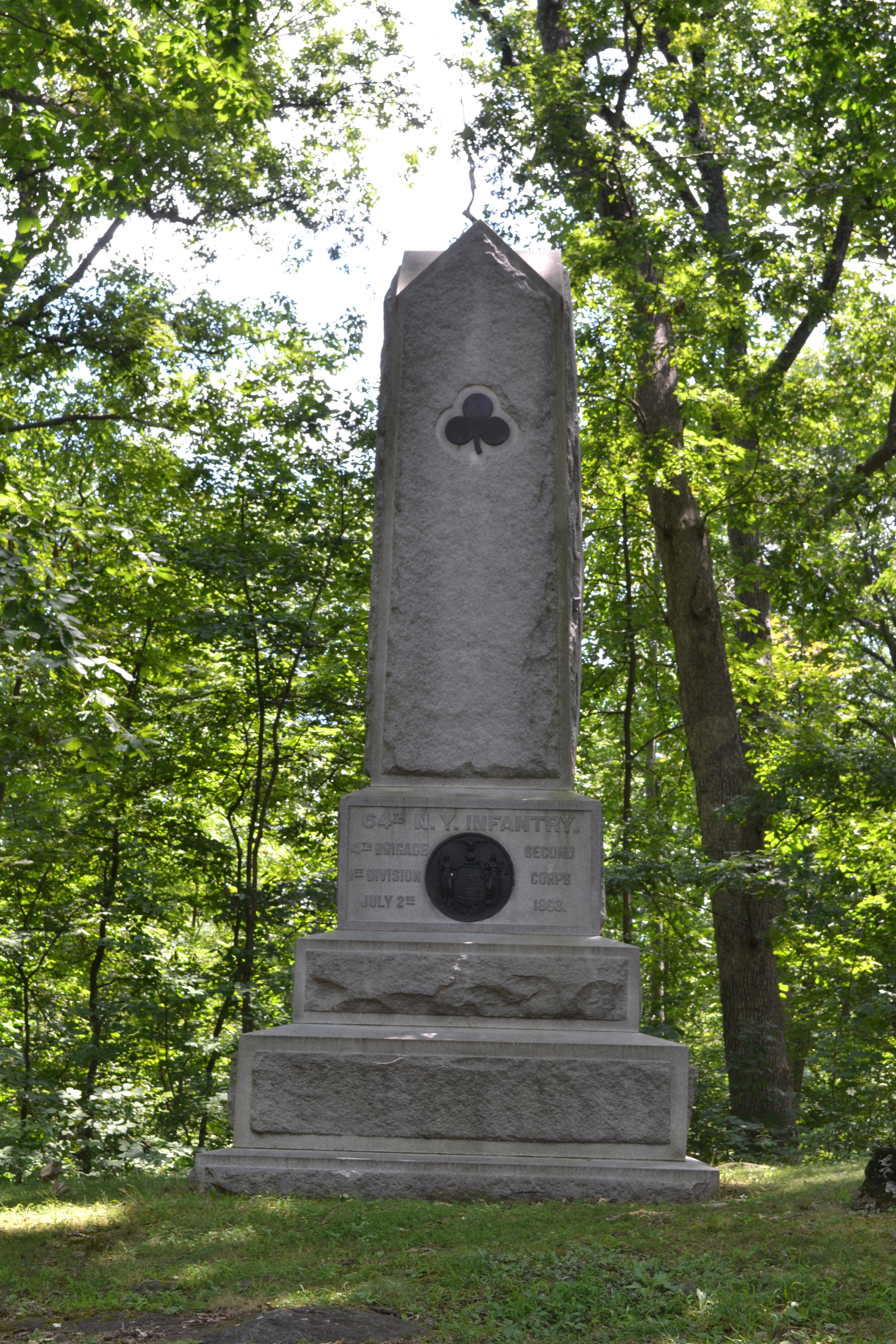
64th NY Infantry Monument at Gettysburg

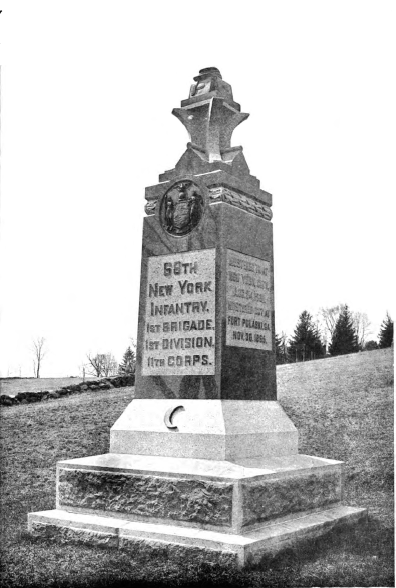
68th NY Infantry Monument at Gettysburg

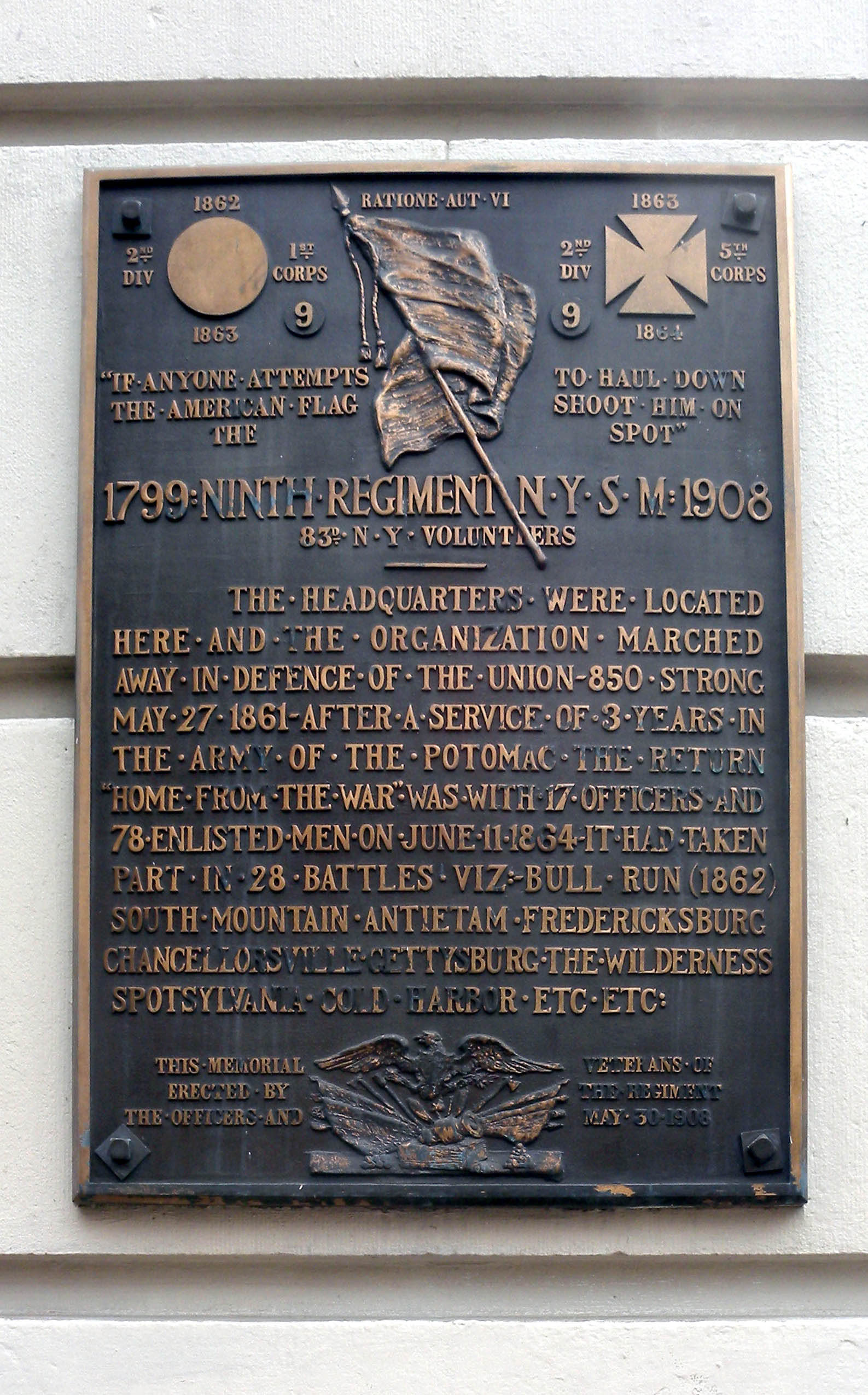
Plaque for 83rd NY Volunteers

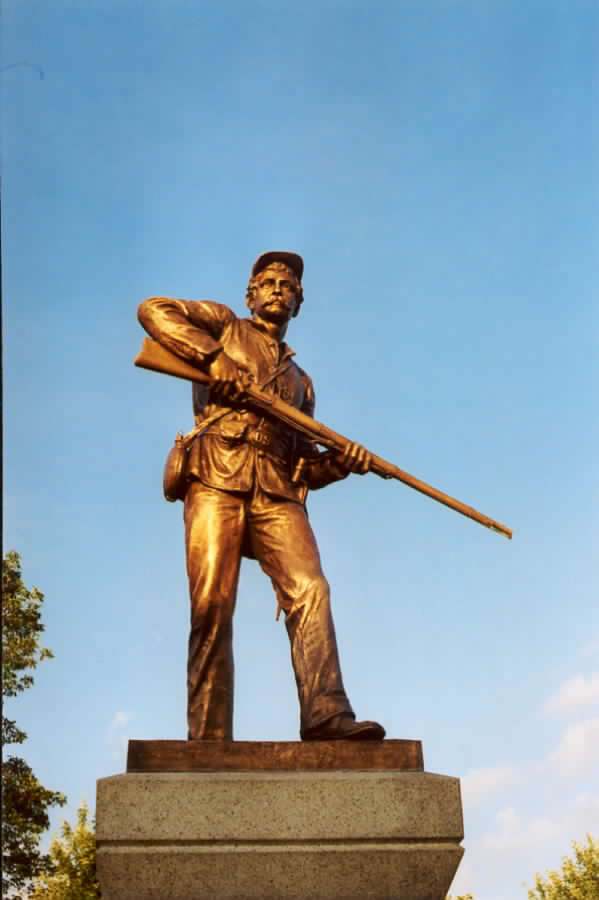
111th NY Infantry Monument at Gettysburg

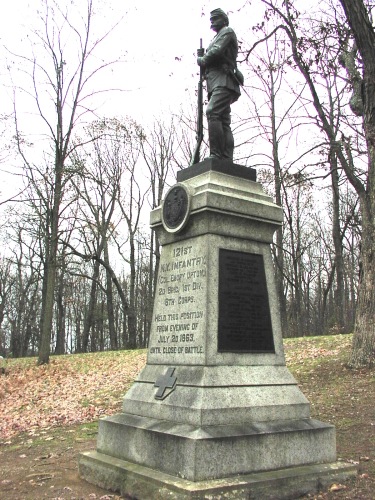
121st NY Infantry Monument at Gettysburg

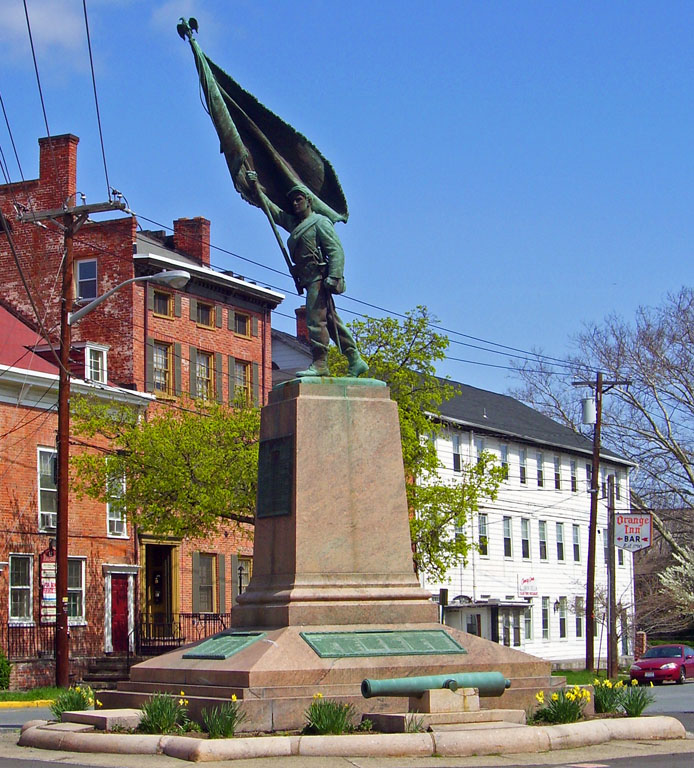
124th NY Infantry Monument at Goshen, NY

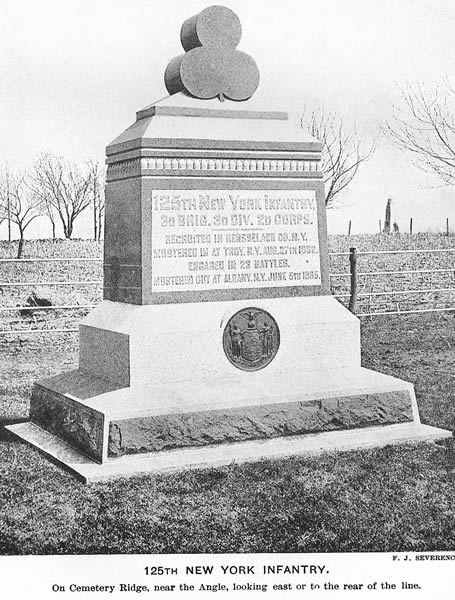
125th NY Infantry Monument at Gettysburg

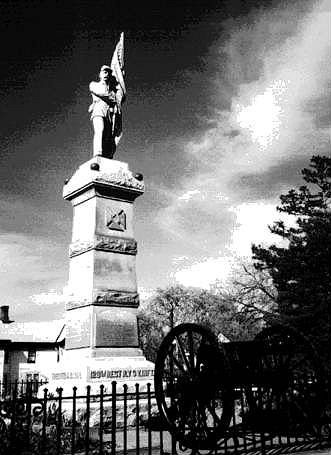
128th NY Infantry Monument at Poughkeepsie, NY

Unit	Nickname	Note
1st New York Volunteer Infantry Regiment		
2nd New York Volunteer Infantry Regiment	"Troy Regiment"	
3rd New York Volunteer Infantry Regiment	"Albany Regiment"	
4th New York Volunteer Infantry Regiment	"1st Scott's Life Guard"	
5th New York Volunteer Infantry Regiment	"National Zouaves"; "Advance Guard Zouaves"; "Duryée's Zouaves"	
5th New York Veteran Volunteer Infantry Regiment	"Duryea's Zouaves"	
6th New York Volunteer Infantry Regiment	"Billy Wilson's Zouaves"; "Union Battalion Zouaves"; "Union Volunteers"	
7th New York Volunteer Infantry Regiment	"Steuben Guard"; "Steuben Regiment"	
7th New York Veteran Infantry Regiment		
8th New York Volunteer Infantry Regiment	"First German Rifles" or "Blenker's Rifles"	
9th New York Volunteer Infantry Regiment	"Hawkins' Zouaves"	
10th New York Volunteer Infantry Regiment	"National Zouaves," "New-York Zouaves," "McChesney's Zouaves"	
11th New York Volunteer Infantry Regiment	"First Fire Zouaves," "Ellsworth Zouaves"	
12th New York Volunteer Infantry Regiment	"First Onondaga Regiment"	
13th New York Volunteer Infantry Regiment	"Rochester Regiment"	
14th New York Volunteer Infantry Regiment	"1st Oneida County Regiment"	
15th New York Volunteer Infantry Regiment	"New York Sappers And Miners"	Converted into 15th Engineers
16th New York Volunteer Infantry Regiment	"1st Northern New York Regiment"	
17th New York Volunteer Infantry Regiment	"Westchester Chasseurs"	
17th New York Veteran Volunteer Infantry Regiment	"Veteran Zouaves"	
18th New York Volunteer Infantry Regiment	"New York State Rifles"	
19th New York Volunteer Infantry Regiment	"Cayuga County Regiment"	Converted into 3rd New York Light Artillery Regiment
20th New York Volunteer Infantry Regiment	"United Turner Rifles"	
21st New York Volunteer Infantry Regiment	"1st Buffalo Regiment"	
22nd New York Volunteer Infantry Regiment	"2nd Northern New York Regiment"	
23rd New York Volunteer Infantry Regiment	"Southern Tier Regiment"	
24th New York Volunteer Infantry Regiment	"Oswego County Regiment"	
25th New York Volunteer Infantry Regiment (3 month)		
25th New York Volunteer Infantry Regiment	"Union Rangers", "Kerrigan Rangers"	
26th New York Volunteer Infantry Regiment	"2nd Oneida Regiment"	
27th New York Volunteer Infantry Regiment	"Union Regiment"	
28th New York Volunteer Infantry Regiment (3 month)		
28th New York Volunteer Infantry Regiment	Niagara Rifles" or "Scott Life Guard"	
29th New York Volunteer Infantry Regiment	"Astor Rifles" or "1st German Infantry"	
29th New York Veteran Volunteer Infantry Regiment		Failed to complete organization. Enlistees were transferred to the 13th New York Heavy Artillery Regiment on October 14, 1863.
30th New York Volunteer Infantry Regiment		
31st New York Volunteer Infantry Regiment	"Baxter's Light Guard" or "Montezuma Regiment"	
31st New York Veteran Volunteer Infantry Regiment		Failed to complete organization. Enlistees were transferred to the 5th New York Veteran Volunteer Infantry Regiment on October 14, 1863.
32nd New York Volunteer Infantry Regiment	"1st California Regiment"	
33rd New York Volunteer Infantry Regiment	"Ontario Regiment"	
34th New York Volunteer Infantry Regiment	"Herkimer Regiment"	
35th New York Volunteer Infantry Regiment	"Jefferson County Regiment"	
36th New York Volunteer Infantry Regiment	"Washington Volunteers"	
37th New York Volunteer Infantry Regiment	"Irish Rifles"	
38th New York Volunteer Infantry Regiment	"Second Scott's Life Guard"	
38th New York Veteran Volunteer Infantry Regiment		Failed to complete organization. Enlistees were transferred to the 5th New York Veteran Volunteer Infantry Regiment on October 14, 1863.
39th New York Volunteer Infantry Regiment	"Garibaldi Guard" or "First Foreign Rifles"	
40th New York Volunteer Infantry Regiment	"Mozart Regiment," "United States Constitution Guard"	
41st New York Volunteer Infantry Regiment	"De Kalb Regiment," "Second Yager Regiment"	After three years enlistment period, the regiment was reorganized as six companies battalion. 41st New York Veteran Volunteer Infantry Regiment.
42nd New York Volunteer Infantry Regiment	"Tammany Jackson Guard"	
43rd New York Volunteer Infantry Regiment	"Albany and Yates Rifles"	
44th New York Volunteer Infantry Regiment	"Ellsworth Avengers" or "People's Ellsworth Regiment"	
45th New York Volunteer Infantry Regiment	"5th German Rifles"	
46th New York Volunteer Infantry Regiment	"Fremont Rifles"	
47th New York Volunteer Infantry Regiment	"Washington Grays"	
48th New York Volunteer Infantry Regiment	"Continental Guard" later, "Perry's Saints"	
49th New York Volunteer Infantry Regiment		
50th New York Volunteer Infantry Regiment	"Stuart's Engineers" or "Independent Engineers"	Converted to 50th New York Volunteer Engineers on 22 October 1861
51st New York Volunteer Infantry Regiment	"Shepard Rifles"	
52nd New York Volunteer Infantry Regiment	"German Rangers" or "Sigel Rifles"	
53rd New York Volunteer Infantry Regiment	"D'Epineuil Zouaves" or "Poughkeepsie Boys"	
53rd New York Volunteer Infantry Regiment		Failed to complete organization. Recruits were transferred to the 132nd New York Volunteer Infantry and 162nd New York Volunteer Infantry September 10, 1862.
54th New York Volunteer Infantry Regiment	"Hiram Barney Rifles" or "Barney Black Rifles"	
55th New York Volunteer Infantry Regiment	"Gardes Lafayette"	
56th New York Volunteer Infantry Regiment	"10th Legion"	
57th New York Volunteer Infantry Regiment	"National Guard Rifles"	
58th New York Volunteer Infantry Regiment	"Polish Legion"	
59th New York Volunteer Infantry Regiment	"Union Guards"	
60th New York Volunteer Infantry Regiment	"1st St. Lawrence Regiment"	
61st New York Volunteer Infantry Regiment	"Clinton Guards"	
62nd New York Volunteer Infantry Regiment	"Anderson Zouaves"	
63rd New York Volunteer Infantry Regiment	"Third Regiment Irish Brigade"	Member of the Irish Brigade
64th New York Volunteer Infantry Regiment	"Cattaraugus Regiment"	
65th New York Volunteer Infantry Regiment	"1st United States Chasseurs"	
66th New York Volunteer Infantry Regiment	"Governor's Guard"	
67th New York Volunteer Infantry Regiment	"Beecher's Pets"; "1st Long Island Regiment"	
68th New York Volunteer Infantry Regiment	"Cameron Rifles" or "2nd German Rifle Regiment"	
69th New York Volunteer Infantry Regiment,	"First Regiment Irish Brigade," "The Fighting 69th"	Member of the Irish Brigade
70th New York Volunteer Infantry Regiment	"First Regiment Excelsior Brigade"	Member of Excelsior Brigade
71st New York Volunteer Infantry Regiment	"Second Regiment Excelsior Brigade," "The American Guard"	Member of Excelsior Brigade
72nd New York Volunteer Infantry Regiment	"Third Regiment Excelsior Brigade"	Member of Excelsior Brigade
73rd New York Volunteer Infantry Regiment	"Fourth Regiment Excelsior Brigade," "Second Fire Zouaves"	Member of Excelsior Brigade
74th New York Volunteer Infantry Regiment	"Fifth Regiment Excelsior Brigade"	Member of Excelsior Brigade
75th New York Volunteer Infantry Regiment	"Auburn Regiment"	
76th New York Volunteer Infantry Regiment	"Cortland Regiment"	What remained of the 76th New York was transferred to the 147th New York Infantry in January 1865.
77th New York Volunteer Infantry Regiment	"Bemis Heights Regiment" or "Saratoga Regiment"	
78th New York Volunteer Infantry Regiment	"78th Highlanders," "Lochiel Cameron Highlanders," "First Regiment, Eagle Brigade"	
79th New York Volunteer Infantry Regiment	"Highland Guard"	Formed from 79th New York State Militia
80th New York Volunteer Infantry Regiment	"Ulster Guard"	Formed from the 20th New York State Militia Regiment.
81st New York Volunteer Infantry Regiment	"2nd Oswego Regiment" or "Mohawk Rangers"	
82nd New York Volunteer Infantry Regiment	"State Guards", "2nd New York Light Infantry"	Formed from the 2nd Regiment New York State Militia.
83rd New York Volunteer Infantry Regiment	"Ninth Militia," "Ninth Infantry National Guard," or "City Guard"	Formed from the 9th New York State Militia.
84th New York Volunteer Infantry Regiment (14th Brooklyn N.Y.S.M.)	"Fourteenth Brooklyn," "Red Legged Devils"	
85th New York Volunteer Infantry Regiment	"The Plymouth Pilgrims"	
86th New York Volunteer Infantry Regiment	"Steuben Rangers"	
87th New York Volunteer Infantry Regiment	"13th Brooklyn"	Formed from 13th New York State Militia and several uncompleted units
88th New York Volunteer Infantry Regiment	"Second Regiment Irish Brigade," "Mrs. Meagher's Own"	Member of the Irish Brigade
89th New York Volunteer Infantry Regiment	"Dickinson Guard"	
90th New York Volunteer Infantry Regiment	"Hancock Guard"	
91st New York Volunteer Infantry Regiment	"Albany Regiment"	
92nd New York Volunteer Infantry Regiment	"2nd St. Lawrence County Regiment", "New York Excelsior Rifle Legion", "Excelsior Rifle Blues", and "Potsdam Regiment"	
93rd New York Volunteer Infantry Regiment	"Morgan Rifles"	
94th New York Volunteer Infantry Regiment	"Bell Rifles"	
95th New York Volunteer Infantry Regiment	"Warren Rifles"	
96th New York Volunteer Infantry Regiment	"Plattsburg Regiment"	
97th New York Volunteer Infantry Regiment	"Conkling Rifles"	
98th New York Volunteer Infantry Regiment	"Wayne County Regiment"	
99th New York Volunteer Infantry Regiment	"Union Coast Guard"	
100th New York Volunteer Infantry Regiment	"3rd Buffalo Regiment"	
101st New York Volunteer Infantry Regiment	"Union Brigade"	
102nd New York Volunteer Infantry Regiment	"Van Buren Light Infantry"	
103rd New York Volunteer Infantry Regiment	"Seward Infantry"	
104th New York Volunteer Infantry Regiment	"Wadsworth Guards" or "Livingston County Regiment"	
105th New York Volunteer Infantry Regiment	"Rochester Regiment"	
106th New York Volunteer Infantry Regiment	"St. Lawrence County Regiment"	
107th New York Volunteer Infantry Regiment	"Campbell Guards"	
108th New York Volunteer Infantry Regiment		
109th New York Volunteer Infantry Regiment	"Binghamton Regiment" or "Railway Brigade"	
110th New York Volunteer Infantry Regiment		
111th New York Volunteer Infantry Regiment	"Harper's Ferry Regiment"	
112th New York Volunteer Infantry Regiment	"Chautauqua Regiment"	
113th New York Volunteer Infantry Regiment	"Albany County Regiment" also known as "Seymour Guard"	Originally mustered in as infantry on August 18, 1862. Re-designated 7th New York Heavy Artillery on December 19, 1862 due to need for the defenses of Washington, D.C.
114th New York Volunteer Infantry Regiment		
115th New York Volunteer Infantry Regiment	"Iron Hearted Regiment"	
116th New York Volunteer Infantry Regiment		
117th New York Volunteer Infantry Regiment	"4th Oneida Regiment"	
118th New York Volunteer Infantry Regiment	"Adirondack Regiment"	
119th New York Volunteer Infantry Regiment		
120th New York Volunteer Infantry Regiment	"Ulster Regiment" or "Washington Guards"	Member of Excelsior Brigade
121st New York Volunteer Infantry Regiment	"Onesters"	
122nd New York Volunteer Infantry Regiment	"Onondagas"	
123rd New York Volunteer Infantry Regiment		
124th New York Volunteer Infantry Regiment	"Orange Blossoms"	
125th New York Volunteer Infantry Regiment	"Harper's Ferry Regiment"	
126th New York Volunteer Infantry Regiment	"Harper's Ferry Regiment"	
127th New York Volunteer Infantry Regiment	"National Volunteers" or "Monitors"	
128th New York Volunteer Infantry Regiment	"Old Steady"	
129th New York Volunteer Infantry Regiment	"Albany County Regiment" and the "Seymour Guard"	Originally mustered in as infantry on August 22, 1862. Re-designated 8th New York Heavy Artillery on December 19, 1862 due to need for the defenses of Washington, D.C.
130th New York Volunteer Infantry Regiment		Reorganized as 19th New York Cavalry
131st New York Volunteer Infantry Regiment	"1st Metropolitan Guards"	
132nd New York Volunteer Infantry Regiment	"Hillhouse Light Guards"	Also the "Second Regiment, Empire, Spinola's Brigade"
133rd New York Volunteer Infantry Regiment	"2nd Metropolitan Guards"	
134th New York Volunteer Infantry Regiment		
135th New York Volunteer Infantry Regiment	"Anthony Wayne Guard"	Mustered in as the infantry on September 2, 1862. Re-designated 6th New York Heavy Artillery on October 3, 1862 due to need for the defenses of Washington, D.C.
136th New York Volunteer Infantry Regiment	"Ironclads"	
137th New York Volunteer Infantry Regiment		
138th New York Volunteer Infantry Regiment	"2nd Auburn Regiment" and the "Cayuga and Wayne County Regiment"	Re-designated 9th New York Heavy Artillery Regiment on December 19, 1862 due to need for the defenses of Washington, D.C.
139th New York Volunteer Infantry Regiment		
140th New York Volunteer Infantry Regiment	"Rochester Race Horses"	
141st New York Volunteer Infantry Regiment		
142nd New York Volunteer Infantry Regiment	"St. Lawrence County Regiment"	
143rd New York Volunteer Infantry Regiment	"Sullivan County Regiment"	
144th New York Volunteer Infantry Regiment		
145th New York Volunteer Infantry Regiment	"Stanton Legion"	
146th New York Volunteer Infantry Regiment	"Garrard's Tigers" or "Halleck's Infantry"	
147th New York Volunteer Infantry Regiment	"Oswego Regiment" or "Ploughboys"	
148th New York Volunteer Infantry Regiment		
149th New York Volunteer Infantry Regiment	"Dutchess County Regiment"	
150th New York Volunteer Infantry Regiment		
151st New York Volunteer Infantry Regiment		
152nd New York Volunteer Infantry Regiment		
153rd New York Volunteer Infantry Regiment		
154th New York Volunteer Infantry Regiment	"The Hardtack Regiment"	
155th New York Volunteer Infantry Regiment		
156th New York Volunteer Infantry Regiment	"Mountain Legion"	
157th New York Volunteer Infantry Regiment	"Madison and Cortland Regiment"	
158th New York Volunteer Infantry Regiment		
159th New York Volunteer Infantry Regiment		
160th New York Volunteer Infantry Regiment		
161st New York Volunteer Infantry Regiment		
162nd New York Volunteer Infantry Regiment	"3rd Metropolitan Guard"	
163rd New York Volunteer Infantry Regiment	"3rd Regiment, Empire Brigade"	
164th New York Volunteer Infantry Regiment	"Corcoran Guard"	
165th New York Volunteer Infantry Regiment	"2nd Battalion Duryée's Zouaves" or "Smith's Zouaves"	
166th New York Volunteer Infantry Regiment		Failed to complete organization. Recruits were transferred to the 176th New York Volunteer Infantry on November 13, 1862.
167th New York Volunteer Infantry Regiment		Failed to complete organization. Recruits were transferred to the 159th New York Volunteer Infantry on October 12, 1862.
168th New York Volunteer Infantry Regiment	"19th State Militia"	
169th New York Volunteer Infantry Regiment	"Troy Regiment"	
170th New York Volunteer Infantry Regiment	"4th Corcoran Legion"	
171st New York Volunteer Infantry Regiment		Failed to complete organization. Recruits were transferred to the 175th New York Volunteer Infantry.
172nd New York Volunteer Infantry Regiment		Failed to complete organization. Recruits were transferred to the 6th New York Heavy Artillery.
173rd New York Volunteer Infantry Regiment	"4th Metropolitan Guard"	
174th New York Volunteer Infantry Regiment	"5th Metropolitan Guard"	
175th New York Volunteer Infantry Regiment		
176th New York Volunteer Infantry Regiment	"Ironsides"	
177th New York Volunteer Infantry Regiment	"10th New York National Guard"	
178th New York Volunteer Infantry Regiment	"The Defenders"; "2nd Regiment, Hawkins Zouaves"	
179th New York Volunteer Infantry Regiment		
180th New York Volunteer Infantry Regiment		Failed to complete organization. Recruits were transferred to the 179th New York Volunteer Infantry on February 21, 1865, as Company G.
181st New York Volunteer Infantry Regiment		Failed to complete organization.
182nd New York Volunteer Infantry Regiment		
183rd New York Volunteer Infantry Regiment		Failed to complete organization. Recruits were transferred to the 188th New York Volunteer Infantry on August 3, 1864, as Company A.
184th New York Volunteer Infantry Regiment		
185th New York Volunteer Infantry Regiment		
186th New York Volunteer Infantry Regiment		
187th New York Volunteer Infantry Regiment		
188th New York Volunteer Infantry Regiment		
189th New York Volunteer Infantry Regiment		
190th New York Volunteer Infantry Regiment		Failed to complete organization.
191st New York Volunteer Infantry Regiment		Failed to complete organization.
192nd New York Volunteer Infantry Regiment		
193rd New York Volunteer Infantry Regiment		
194th New York Volunteer Infantry Regiment		
1st Battalion New York Volunteer Sharpshooters		
Independent Battalion of New York Volunteer Infantry	"Enfants Perdus", "Lost Children", "German Legion"	
New York British Volunteers		Absorbed into the 36th New York Infantry

== Militia infantry ==
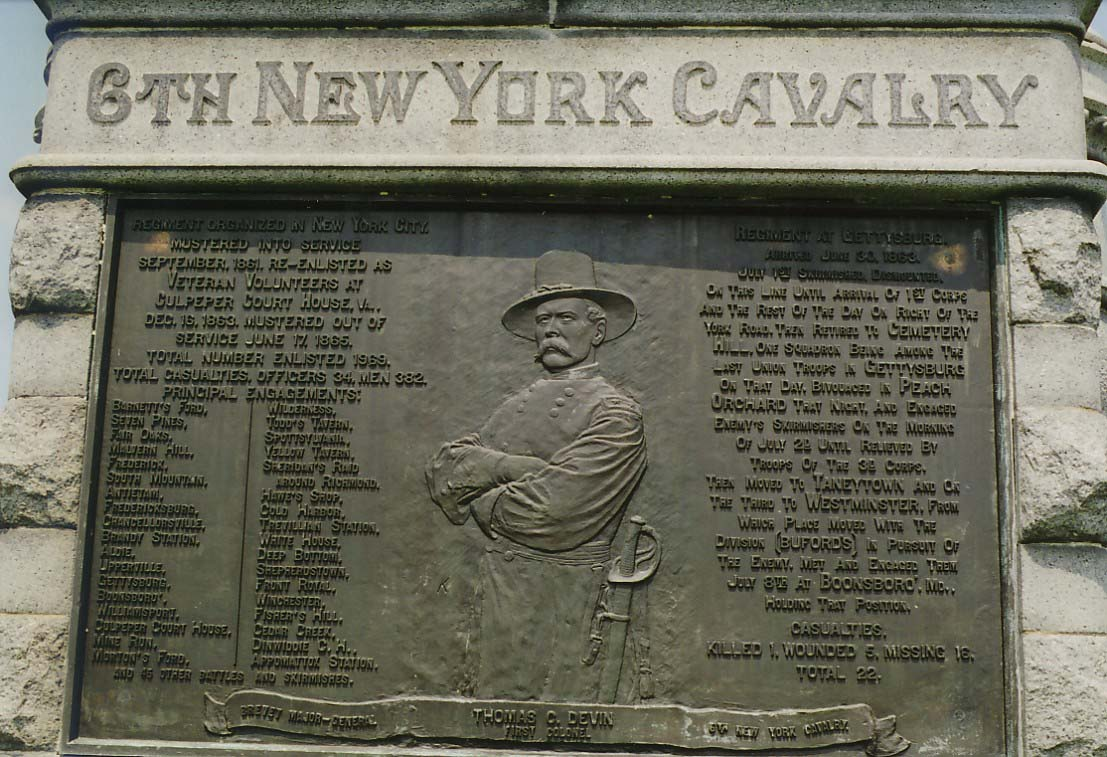
Thomas Devin at Gettysburg

Unit	Nickname	Note
2nd New York State Militia Regiment		later the 82nd New York Volunteer Infantry Regiment (see above)
4th Regiment New York National Guard Infantry		
5th Regiment New York National Guard Infantry		
6th Regiment New York National Guard Infantry		
7th New York State Militia Regiment	"Silk Stocking"	
8th New York Militia Infantry Regiment	"Washington Grays"	
8th Regiment New York National Guard Infantry	"Washington Grays"	Redesignated from 8th NYSM
9th Regiment New York National Guard Infantry		later the 83rd New York Volunteer Infantry Regiment (see above)
11th Regiment New York National Guard Infantry		
12th New York State Militia Regiment		Lt. Col. John Jacob Astor III
14th New York State Militia Regiment	"Red Legged Devils" (see above)	later the 84th New York Volunteer Infantry Regiment (see above)
20th New York State Militia Regiment	"Ulster Guard"	later the 80th New York Volunteer Infantry Regiment (see above)
22nd Regiment New York National Guard Infantry		
25th Regiment New York National Guard Infantry		
28th Regiment New York National Guard Infantry		
37th Regiment New York National Guard Infantry		
69th New York State Militia Regiment	"The Fighting 69th" (see above)	
Union Continentals

== Cavalry ==
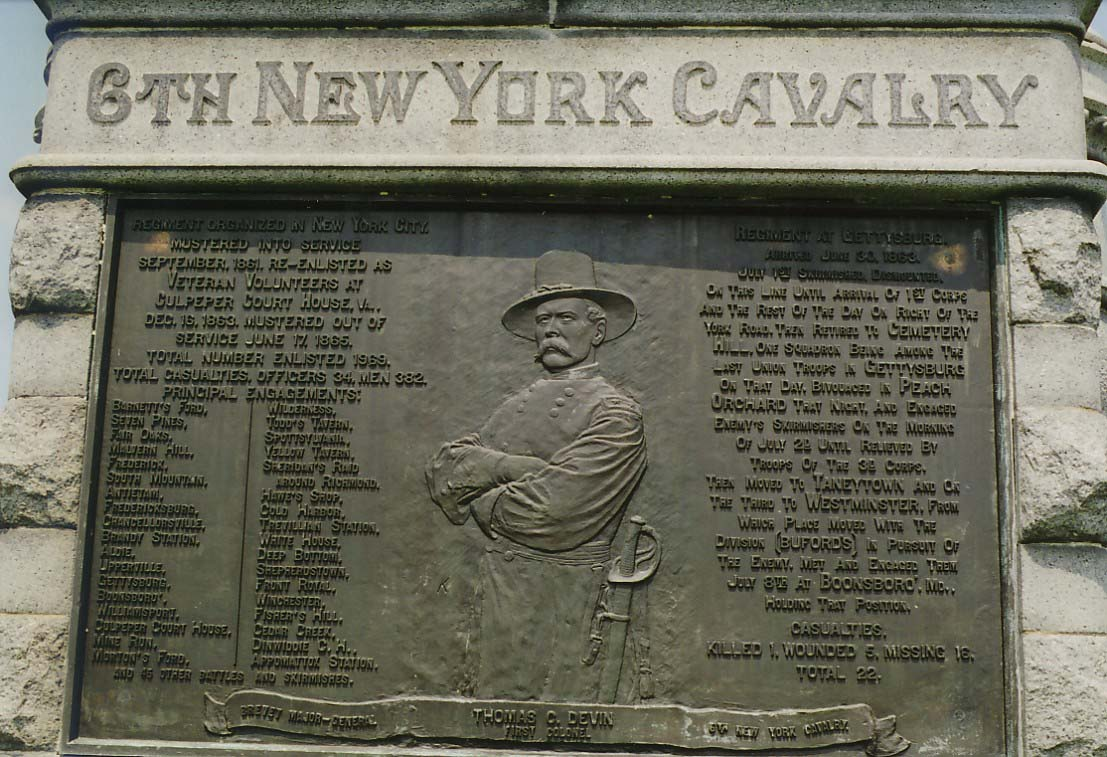
Thomas Devin at Gettysburg

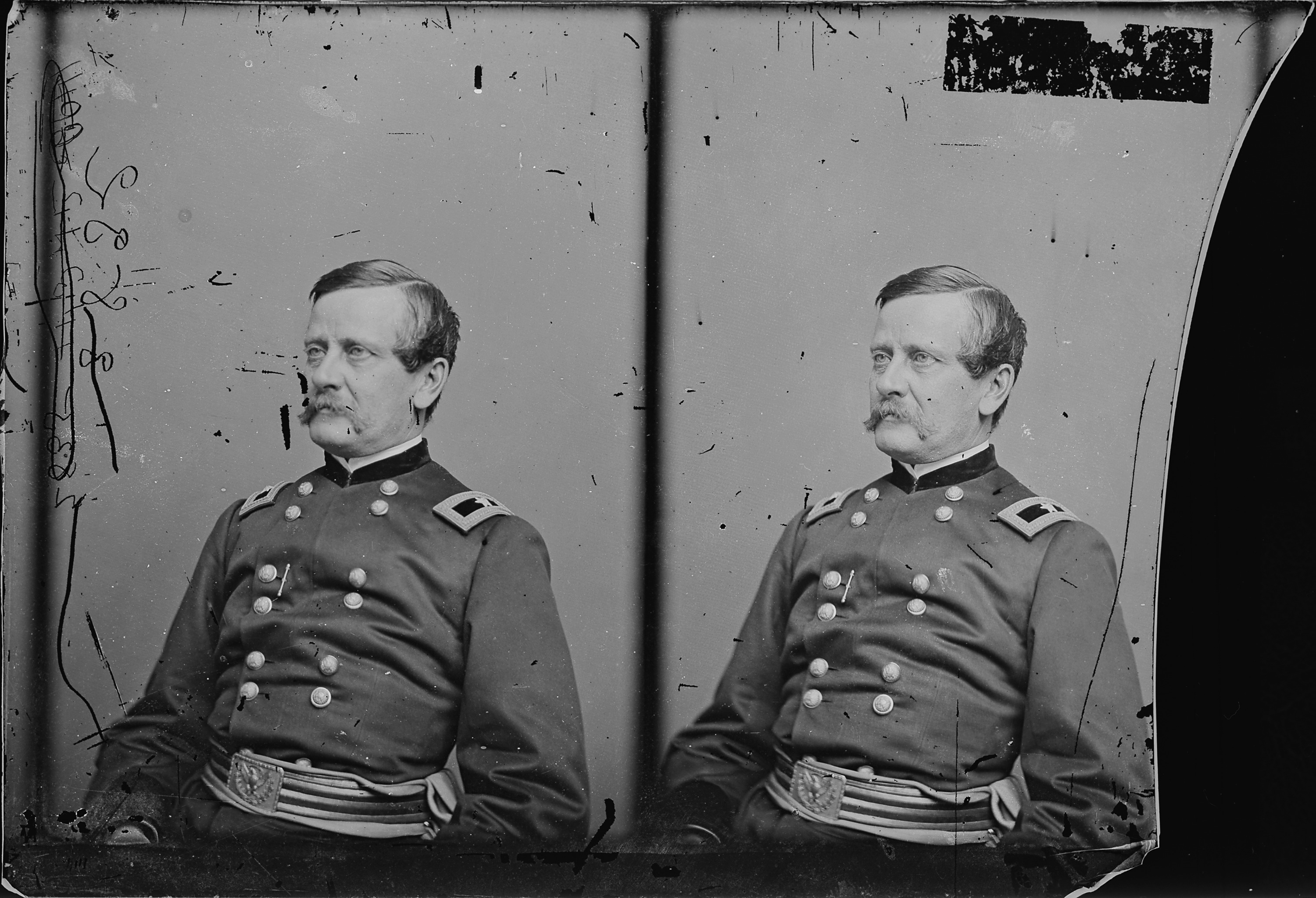
Colonel James H. Van Allen 3rd New York Cavalry

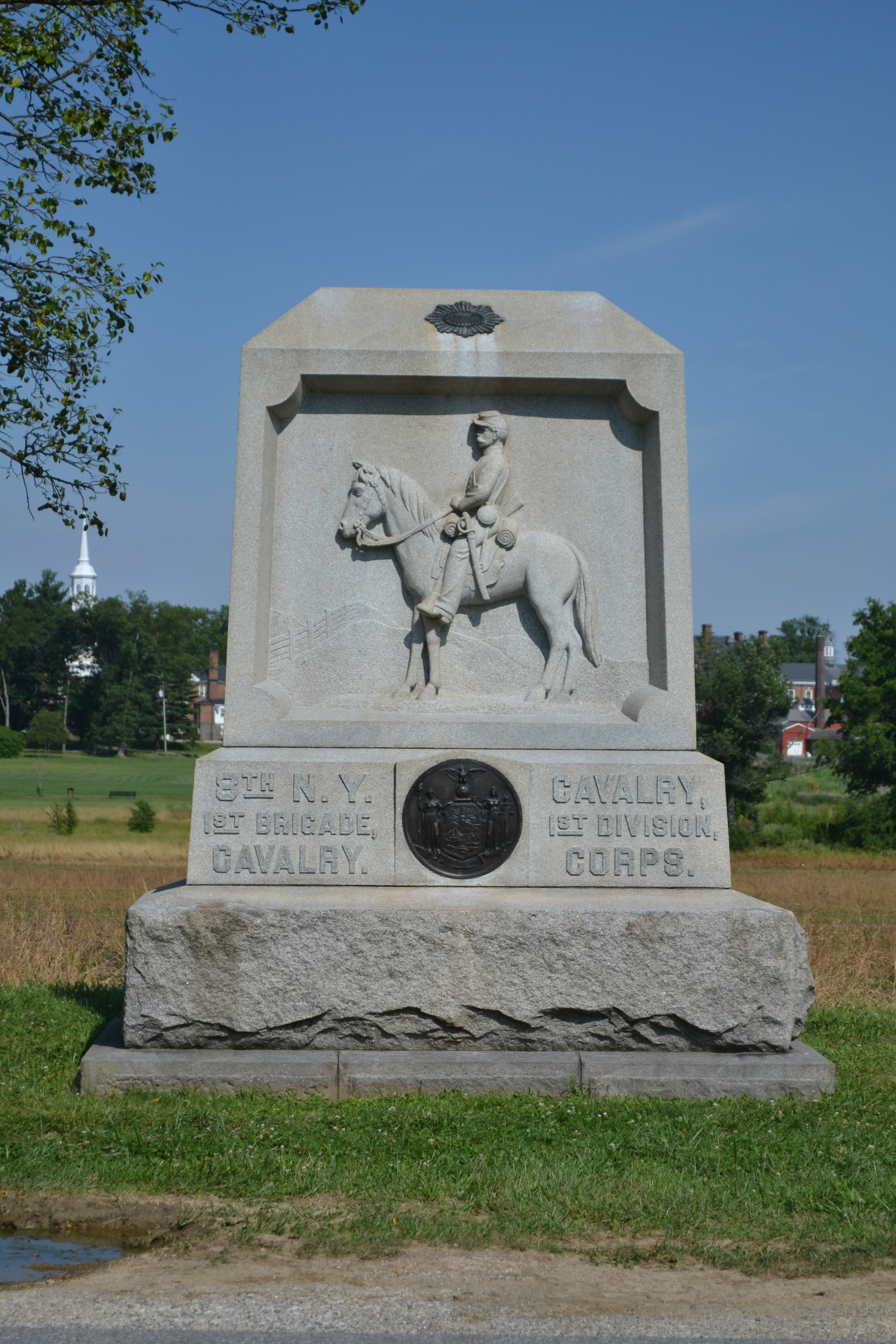
Monument to the 8th New York Volunteer Cavalry at Gettysburg

Unit	Nickname	Note
1st Regiment New York Volunteer Cavalry	"Lincoln Cavalry"	
1st Regiment New York Veteran Volunteer Cavalry		
1st Regiment New York Mounted Rifles		Sometimes referred to as 7th Regiment New York Volunteer Cavalry
1st Regiment New York Dragoons		
1st Regiment New York Provisional Cavalry		
2nd Regiment New York Volunteer Cavalry	"Harris Light"	
2nd Regiment New York Veteran Volunteer Cavalry	"Empire Light Cavalry"	
2nd Regiment New York Mounted Rifles		
2nd Regiment New York Provisional Cavalry		
3rd Regiment New York Volunteer Cavalry	"Van Allen Cavalry"	
3rd Regiment New York Provisional Cavalry		
4th Regiment New York Volunteer Cavalry	"Dickel's Mounted Rifles"	
4th Regiment New York Provisional Cavalry		
5th Regiment New York Volunteer Cavalry	"1st Ira Harris Guard"	
6th Regiment New York Volunteer Cavalry	"2nd Ira Harris Guard"	
7th Regiment New York Volunteer Cavalry	"Black Horse Cavalry"	Never mounted, mustered out in favor of 1st Regiment New York Mounted Rifles
8th Regiment New York Volunteer Cavalry	"Rochester Regiment"	
9th Regiment New York Volunteer Cavalry	"Stoneman Cavalry"	
10th Regiment New York Volunteer Cavalry	"Porter Guard"	
11th Regiment New York Volunteer Cavalry	"Scott's 900"	
12th Regiment New York Volunteer Cavalry	"3rd Ira Harris Guard"	
13th Regiment New York Volunteer Cavalry	"Seymour Light"	
14th Regiment New York Volunteer Cavalry	"1st Metropolitan Cavalry"	
15th Regiment New York Volunteer Cavalry		
16th Regiment New York Volunteer Cavalry	"Sprague Light Cavalry"	
17th Regiment New York Volunteer Cavalry		
18th Regiment New York Volunteer Cavalry	"Cornish Light Cavalry"	
19th Regiment New York Volunteer Cavalry		Converted into 1st New York Dragoons
20th Regiment New York Volunteer Cavalry	"M'Clellan"	
21st Regiment New York Volunteer Cavalry	"Griswold Light Cavalry"	
22nd Regiment New York Volunteer Cavalry		
23rd Regiment New York Volunteer Cavalry	"Mix's Battalion"	
24th Regiment New York Volunteer Cavalry		
25th Regiment New York Volunteer Cavalry		
26th Regiment New York Volunteer Cavalry	"Frontier Cavalry"	
Devin's Company, 1st Cavalry, New York Militia	"Jackson Horse Guard"	
Oneida Independent Company New York Volunteer Cavalry		
Sauer's Company "C" Hussars, 3rd Cavalry, New York Militia		

== Artillery ==
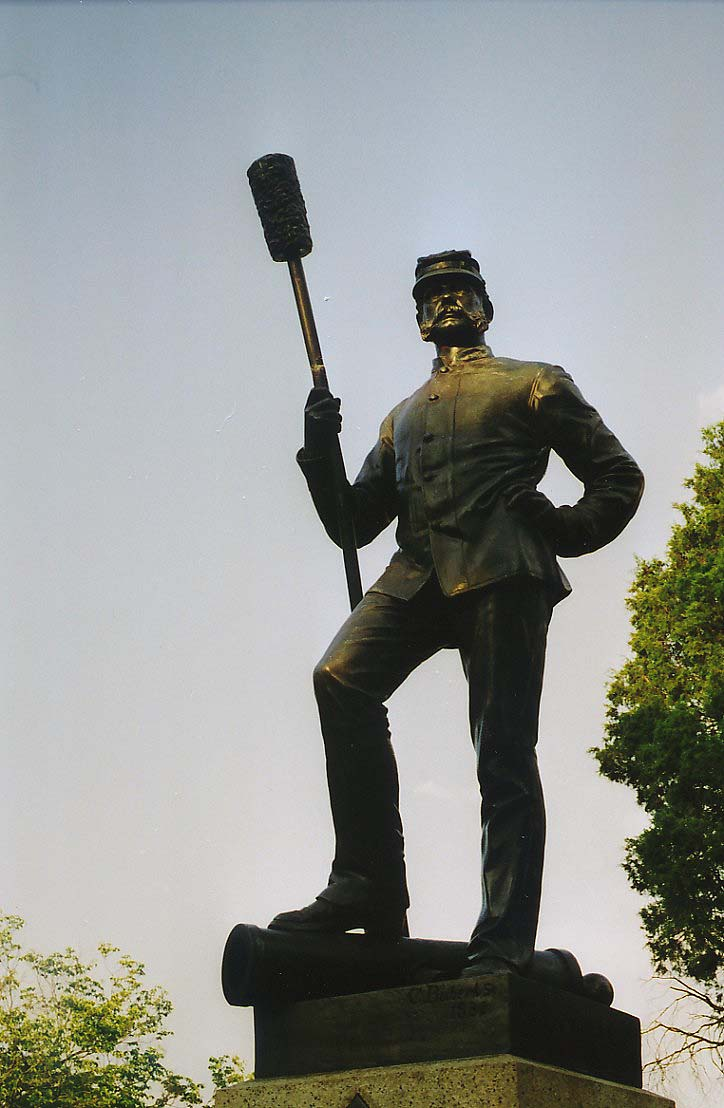
Monument to the 4th NY Battery at Gettysburg Battlefield, by Caspar Buberl

Unit	Nickname	Note
1st New York Heavy Artillery Regiment		
2nd New York Heavy Artillery Regiment		
3rd New York Heavy Artillery Regiment		
4th New York Heavy Artillery Regiment		
5th New York Heavy Artillery Regiment		
6th New York Heavy Artillery Regiment	"Anthony Wayne Guard"	Mustered in as the 135th regiment of infantry on the September 2, 1862. Re-designated 6th regiment of heavy artillery on October 3, 1862 due to need for defense around the American capital.
7th New York Heavy Artillery Regiment		Originally mustered in as 113th regiment of infantry on August 18, 1862. Re-designated 7th New York Heavy Artillery on December 19, 1862 due to need for defenses surrounding the capital.
8th New York Heavy Artillery Regiment		Originally mustered in as 129th New York Infantry Regiment on August 22, 1862. Re-designated 8th New York Heavy Artillery on December 19, 1862 due to need for defenses surrounding the capital.
9th New York Heavy Artillery Regiment	"2nd Auburn Regiment" and "Cayuga and Wayne County Regiment"	Originally mustered in as 138th New York Infantry Regiment on September 8, 1862. Re-designated 9th New York Heavy Artillery on December 19, 1862 due to need for defenses surrounding the capital.
10th New York Heavy Artillery Regiment	"Black River Artillery;" "Jefferson County Regiment"	
11th New York Heavy Artillery Regiment		
12th New York Heavy Artillery Regiment		Uncompleted – became part of the 15th Heavy Artillery
13th New York Heavy Artillery Regiment		
14th New York Heavy Artillery Regiment		
15th New York Heavy Artillery Regiment		
16th New York Heavy Artillery Regiment		
1st New York Marine Artillery Regiment	"Howard's Artillery, Naval Brigade"	
3rd New York Light Artillery Regiment		Originally mustered in as 19th New York Infantry Regiment on May 22, 1861. Re-designated 3rd New York Light Artillery Regiment on December 11, 1862.
1st New York Heavy Artillery Battalion		Units converted into independent light artillery batteries
3rd New York Heavy Artillery Battalion		Became part of the 15th Heavy Artillery Regiment
4th New York Heavy Artillery Battalion		Became part of the 10th Heavy Artillery Regiment
5th New York Heavy Artillery Battalion		Became part of the 10th Heavy Artillery Regiment
6th New York Heavy Artillery Battalion		Became part of the 5th Heavy Artillery Regiment
8th New York Heavy Artillery Battalion		Became part of the 10th Heavy Artillery Regiment
1st New York Light Artillery Battalion	"Brickel's German Light Artillery"	
2nd New York Light Artillery Battalion		Units later became part of 14th and 15th Batteries Light Artillery
Anthon's Battalion of Artillery	Willard's Battalion of Artillery	Uncompleted – became part of 20th and 28th Batteries Light Artillery
New York Rocket Battalion	General Barry's Rocket Battalion of Artillery	Units later became part of 23rd and 24th Batteries Light Artillery
2nd Independent Battery New York Light Artillery		
3rd Independent Battery New York Light Artillery		
5th Independent Battery New York Light Artillery	"1st Excelsior Light Artillery"	
11th Independent Battery New York Light Artillery	"Havelock Battery"	
12th Independent Battery New York Light Artillery		
13th Independent Battery New York Light Artillery (Veteran)		
14th Independent Battery New York Light Artillery		
15th Independent Battery New York Light Artillery		
17th Independent Battery New York Light Artillery		
18th Independent Battery New York Light Artillery		
19th Independent Battery New York Light Artillery		
20th Independent Battery, New York Volunteer Artillery		
21st Independent Battery New York Light Artillery		
22nd Independent Battery New York Light Artillery		
23rd Independent Battery New York Light Artillery		
24th Independent Battery New York Light Artillery		
25th Independent Battery New York Light Artillery		
26th Independent Battery New York Light Artillery		
27th Independent Battery New York Light Artillery		
28th Independent Battery New York Light Artillery		
29th Independent Battery New York Light Artillery		
30th Independent Battery New York Light Artillery		
31st Independent Battery New York Light Artillery		
32nd Independent Battery New York Light Artillery		
33rd Independent Battery New York Light Artillery		
34th Independent Battery New York Light Artillery		
35th Independent Battery New York Light Artillery		Failed to complete organization
36th Independent Battery New York Light Artillery		Failed to complete organization
Varian's Battery, Light Artillery/New York State Militia/New York National Guard	"First Troop, Washington Grays"	Later Company "I" 8th Regiment

=== 1st New York Light Artillery ===
Unit	Nickname	Note
Battery A, 1st New York Light Artillery		
Battery B, 1st New York Light Artillery		
Battery C, 1st New York Light Artillery		
Battery D, 1st New York Light Artillery		
Battery E, 1st New York Light Artillery		
Battery F, 1st New York Light Artillery		
Battery G, 1st New York Light Artillery		
Battery H, 1st New York Light Artillery		
Battery I, 1st New York Light Artillery		
Battery K, 1st New York Light Artillery		
Battery L, 1st New York Light Artillery		
Battery M, 1st New York Light Artillery		

== Engineers ==
Unit	Nickname	Note
1st New York Volunteer Engineer Regiment	Artisan's and Engineers; Serrell's Engineers	
2nd New York Volunteer Engineer Regiment		Uncompleted – became part of the 15th New York Engineers
15th New York Volunteer Engineer Regiment	Sappers and Miners	Enlisted as 15th NY Infantry Regiment
50th New York Volunteer Engineer Regiment	Stuart's Engineers	Enlisted as 50th NY Infantry Regiment.

== Brigades ==
Unit	Alternate designations	Note
Eagle Brigade	"Scrogg's Brigade"	
Empire Brigade	"Spinola Brigade"	
Excelsior Brigade	"Sickles' Brigade	
Meager's Irish Brigade		
Corcoran's Brigade	"Corcoran's Legion", "Irish Legion"	
Metropolitan Brigade	"Metropolitan Guard"	Recruited by the New York Metropolitan Police, never served as unified brigade

== See also ==
- List of armories and arsenals in New York City and surrounding counties
- List of American Civil War units by state
