= 192nd Regiment =

192nd Regiment may refer to:

- 192nd New York Infantry Regiment, Union Army
- 192nd Ohio Infantry Regiment, Union Army
- 192nd Mechanized Regiment, Greece

== See also ==
- 192nd (disambiguation)
