= Spinola brigade =

American Civil War unit of Union Army

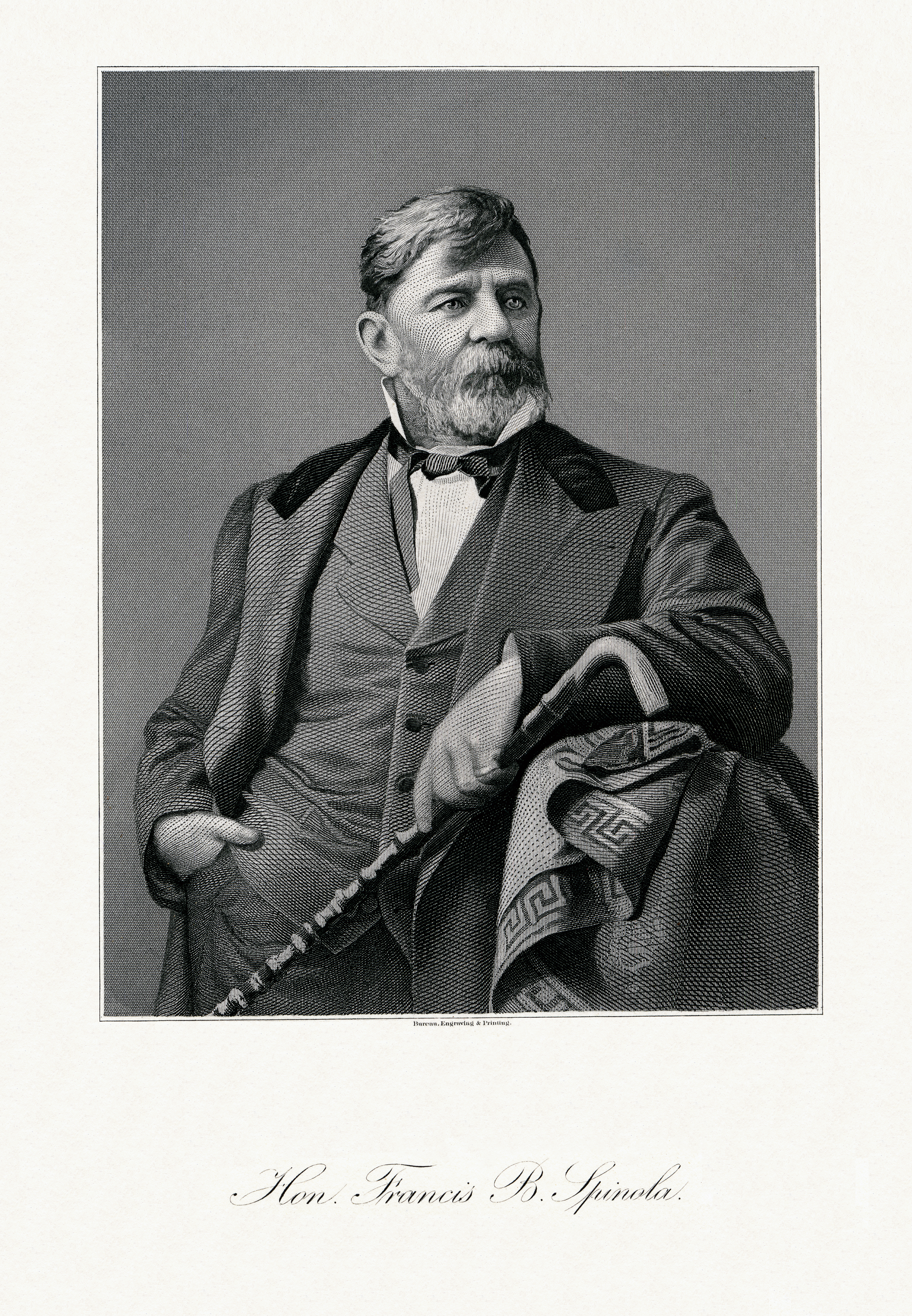
Francis Barretto Spinola, organizer of the "Spinola Empire Brigade" in the American Civil War.

The Spinola Brigade, also known as Spinola's Empire Brigade, was a unit of the Union Army during the American Civil War. Composed of several regiments mainly from New York City; it was named after its initial commander Francis B. Spinola.

Spinola was commissioner of New York Harbor when the civil war erupted. He joined the volunteer army in a New York regiment and was commissioned as an officer. He was appointed brigadier general of Volunteers on October 2, 1862. General Spinola commanded two relief efforts to lift the Confederate siege of Washington, North Carolina. In 1862 he recruited and organized a brigade of four regiments from New York, mainly composed of Italian Americans, known as Spinola's Empire Brigade. The regiments did not serve together in the field as a brigade.

The four regiments of Spinola's brigade included:

- First, 158th New York Volunteer Infantry Regiment;
- Second, 132nd New York Volunteer Infantry Regiment;
- Third, 163rd New York Volunteer Infantry Regiment; and
- Fourth (incomplete), 164th New York Volunteer Infantry Regiment (later transferred to the Corcoran Legion).

Spinola later assumed command of the Excelsior Brigade after the Battle of Gettysburg, but this was not the same organization.

== See also ==
- List of New York Civil War regiments
- New York in the Civil War
