= Charles C. Dodge =

American brigadier general (1841-1910)

Charles Dodge
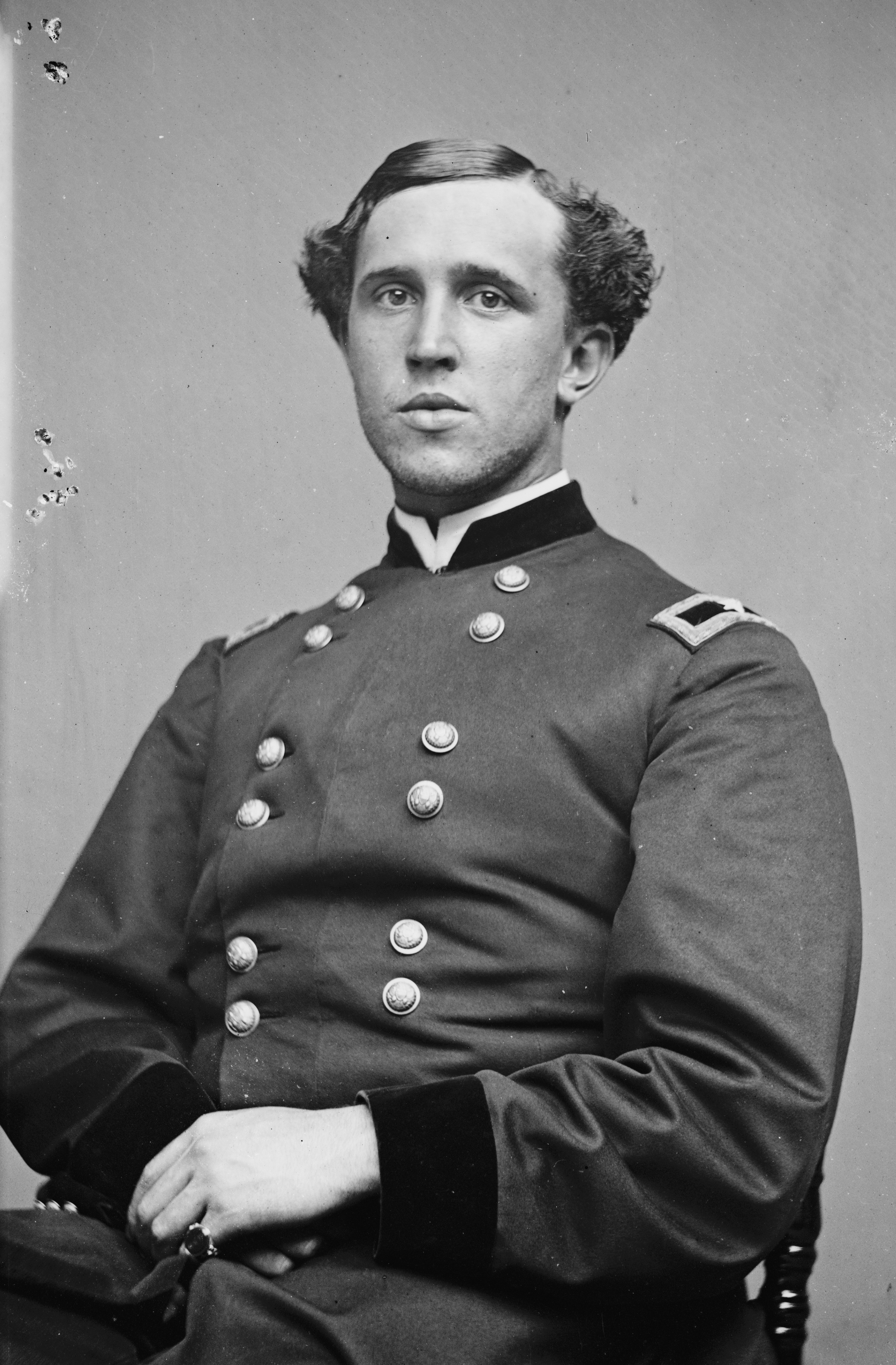
- Brig. Gen. Charles C. Dodge
- Born: September 16, 1841; Plainfield, New Jersey, U.S.
- Died: November 4, 1910 (aged 69); New York City, U.S.
- Burial place: Woodlawn Cemetery, New York City, U.S.
- Relatives: William Earle Dodge (father)
- Military career
- Allegiance: United States (Union)
- Branch: United States Army (Union Army)
- Service years: 1861–1863
- Rank: Brigadier General
- Commands: 1st New York Mounted Rifle Regiment
- Conflicts: American Civil War
- Other work: Businessman

Charles Cleveland Dodge (September 16, 1841 – November 4, 1910) was a brigadier general in the American Civil War and one of the youngest in history, receiving his commission at the age of twenty-one. He was the son of "Merchant Prince" and Congressman William Earle Dodge.

== American Civil War service ==
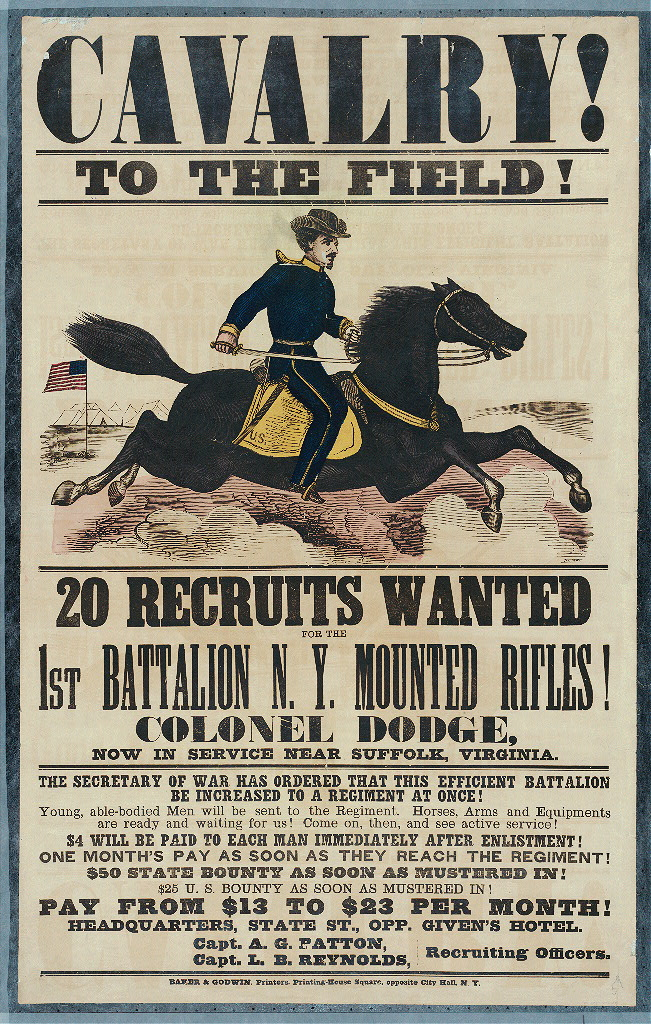
Recruiting poster for the 1st Battalion New York Mounted Rifles

Dodge was commissioned as a captain in the 1st New York Mounted Rifles, also known as 7th New York Volunteer Cavalry in December 1861, and was soon promoted to major. He commanded this cavalry detachment during Maj. Gen. John E. Wool's Norfolk expedition, Prior to this Major Dodge and the Mounted Rifles participated in the clash of ironclads, firing from shore at the CSS Virginia during said Naval engagement.

After the successful seizure, of Norfolk & Gosport Naval Yard, Major Dodge was dispatched to Suffolk on May 12, 1862. This move was to choke off Rebel port and secure roads around the Dismal Swamp. This cut off supplies coming up from Carolina Sounds. Suffolk had been abandoned by rebel forces who withdrew to the Blackwater River. Major Dodge held Suffolk until General Peck was placed in charge and turned Suffolk into a fortress city with 15 miles of defensive works.

Dodge was promoted to the rank of colonel on August 14, 1862, and then to brigadier general on November 29, 1862, an advancement that was lobbied for by a number of prominent New Yorkers, including Theodore Roosevelt Sr. He commanded successful engagements during the Suffolk Campaign and at Hertford, North Carolina. The mounted Rifles under Dodge served as the eyes and ears for General Peck in numerous sorties. Cavalry men under Dodge were the first to detect the movement of Longstreet that led to the siege of Suffolk by Rebel Forces.

He had performed commendably, but there was obviously difficulties between Dodge and his superior Major General John J. Peck, and his Corps commander Major General John A. Dix, who expressed preference for an older officer to lead the cavalry division. In a letter to Edwin M. Stanton, Secretary of War, dated 28 March 1863, John A. Dix wrote:

There is another subject I would like to mention. Col. Dodge of the New York Mounted Rifles has been made Brigadier General. This regiment has given me great trouble. It is known as "Dodge's Rifles". They have plundered in all direction, and since the first of October thirty-five have deserted to the enemy, from ten different companies, most of them from outposts, carrying away their horses, arms and equipment; a thing unprecedented in any Regiment in the service. General Peck refused to recommend his promotion, and I felt it my duty to censure him in General Orders. General Peck does not want him, nor do I. His influence with his regiment is not salutary. Besides, he will be chief of Cavalry, which would otherwise be commanded by General Spear, a most gallant, experienced and efficient officer. I beg of you to put General Dodge on duty elsewhere. He is very young, and should be under an experienced officer if he to be continued in the Cavalry service.

There were no other cavalry officers available with an earlier date of rank, and Dodge refused to be subordinated to someone who was junior to him in seniority. He resigned in June 1863 in protest, and briefly returned to service with the militia to suppress the New York City draft riots. On the third day of rioting Dodge led the 8th New York National Guard supported by Colonel Thaddeus P. Mott's 14th New York Cavalry and John H. Howell's artillery battery to Eighth Avenue and 32nd Street. At the lynching of 3 African-Americans a group of rioters had assembled which possibly numbered 5,000. The crowd retreated from the infantry and cavalry column but struck back with bricks, bats and stones. Howell's artillery was then ordered to open fire which dispersed the rioters. The next day Dodge moved with troops to 22nd Street and engaged rioters near Gramercy Park.

== Later life ==
He then went into business, and was a partner in Phelps Dodge Co., and President of the New York and Boston Cape Cod Canal Co., which was eventually purchased and completed by the Federal Government in 1914.

He died in New York City in 1910 of pneumonia. He was buried in Woodlawn Cemetery (Bronx, New York).

== Family ==
Dodge Family

David Low Dodge (1774–18852)	Married; 1798	Sarah Cleveland (1780–18862)	Anson Green Phelps (1781–18853)	Married; 1806	Olivia Egleston (1784–18859)
William Earl Dodge (1805–18883)	Married; 1828	Melissa Phelps (1809–1903)
William E. Dodge Jr. (1832–1903) m.1854 Sarah Hoadley (1832–1909)	Anson Greene Phelps Dodge (1834–1918) m(1).1859 Rebecca Grew (1836–1927) m(2).1886 Rachel Rose Voorhees (1852–1910)	David Stuart Dodge (1836–1921) m(1).1860 Ellen Ada Phelps (1838–18880) m(2).1885 Elizabeth Scott Boyd (1846–18888)	Charles Cleveland Dodge (1841–1910) m.1863 Maria Theresa; Bradhurst Schieffelin (1840–1910)	Norman White Dodge (1846–1907) m(1).1869 Grace Gillette (1848–18870) m(2).1880 Emma Hartley (1849–18881) m(3).1897 Grace Vernon (1870–1953)	George Eglestone; Dodge (1849–1904) m.1874 May Cossitt (1853–1911)	Arthur Murray Dodge (1852–18896) m.1875 Josephine Jewell (1855–1928)
Charles Stuart Dodge (1864–1948) m.1887 Flora Bigelow (1868–1964)
Lucie Bigelow (Dodge) Rosen (1890–1968)	John Bigelow Dodge (1894–1960)

== See also ==
- List of American Civil War generals (Union)
