= 179th New York Infantry Regiment =

- Active: April 3-September 15, 1864 (mustered in)–June 8, 1865 (mustered out)
- Disbanded: June 8, 1865
- Country: United States
- Allegiance: Union
- Branch: Infantry
- Size: Regiment
- Engagements: American Civil War: Battle of Cold Harbor; Siege of Petersburg; Battle of Globe Tavern; Battle of Poplar Springs Church; Battle of Hatcher's Run; Battle of Fort Stedman; Appomattox Campaign

Insignia
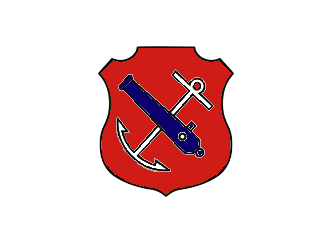
- 1st Division, IX Corps

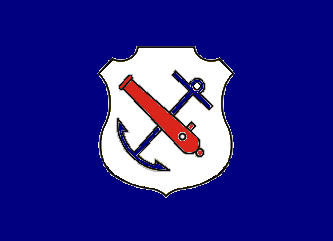
- 2nd Division, IX Corps

The 179th New York Infantry Regiment was an infantry regiment of the Union Army during the American Civil War.

== Service ==
The regiment was organized in Elmira, New York and companies were mustered in for one or three year enlistments in April, May, July, and September 1864; it was composed of companies from Chemung, Steuben, Erie, Tioga, Tompkins and other Counties.

The regiment left the State in detachments throughout 1864; it served in 22nd Corps, from May 1864; in 1st Division, 9th Corps, from June 1864; in 2nd Division, 9th Corps, from September 1864; and was honorably discharged and mustered out June 8, 1865, near Alexandria, Virginia.

The 179th proceeded to Washington, D. C., where it served in the summer of 1864 in the performance of garrison duty. In June, it joined Grant's army at Cold Harbor, and took part in the first failed assaults on Petersburg; then went into entrenchments exposed to fire during the siege, daily losing men. The 179th was engaged in the Battle of the Crater, with dozens killed, wounded and missing; it was reduced by severe losses, and reorganized with more losses in the fall. The regiment rendered service during the attack of Fort Stedman in March 1865 and took part in its last battle, the storming of Petersburg in April, with yet more losses.

== Total strength and casualties ==
During its service the regiment lost by death, killed in action, 4 officers, 36 enlisted men; of wounds received in action, 3 officers, 30 enlisted men; of disease and other causes, 118 enlisted men; total, 7 officers, 184 enlisted men; aggregate, 191; of whom 25 enlisted men died in the hands of the enemy.

== Commanders ==
- Colonel William M. Gregg

== See also ==
- List of New York Civil War regiments
