= 187th New York Infantry Regiment =

- Active: September 1, 1864 - July 1, 1865
- Country: United States
- Allegiance: Union
- Branch: Infantry
- Engagements: Siege of Petersburg; Battle of Boydton Plank Road; Battle of Hatcher's Run; Appomattox Campaign; Battle of Lewis's Farm; Battle of White Oak Road; Battle of Five Forks; Third Battle of Petersburg; Battle of Appomattox Court House

The 187th New York Infantry Regiment was an infantry regiment in the Union Army during the American Civil War.

== Service ==
The 187th New York Infantry was organized beginning September 1, 1864 at Buffalo, New York and mustered in October 8–13, 1864 for one-year service under the command of Colonel William F. Berens. Only nine companies were filled and served under the command of Lieutenant Colonel Daniel Myers.

The regiment was attached to 2nd Brigade, 1st Division, V Corps, Army of the Potomac, to July 1865.

The 187th New York Infantry mustered out of service July 1, 1865.

== Detailed service ==
Left New York for Petersburg, Va., October 1, 1864. Siege of Petersburg, Va., October 20, 1864 to April 2, 1865. Boydton Plank Road, Hatcher's Run, October 27–28, 1864. Warren's Raid on Weldon Railroad December 7–12. Dabney's Mills, Hatcher's Run, February 5–6, 1865. Appomattox Campaign March 28-April 9. Lewis Farm, near Gravelly Run, March 29. Junction of Quaker and Boydton Roads March 29. White Oak Road March 31. Five Forks April 1. Fall of Petersburg April 2. Pursuit of Lee April 3–9. Appomattox Court House April 9. Surrender of Lee and his army. March to Washington, D.C., May 1–12. Grand Review of the Armies May 23. Duty at Washington, D.C., until July.

== Casualties ==
The regiment lost a total of 47 men during service; 15 enlisted men killed or mortally wounded, 32 enlisted men died of disease.

== Commanders ==
- Colonel William F. Berens
- Lieutenant Colonel Daniel Myers

== See also ==
- List of New York Civil War regiments
- New York in the Civil War
