= 99th New York Infantry Regiment =

- Active: May 28 (left NYS) to August 21, 1861 (naval brigade), then August 21, 1861, to July 15, 1865 (infantry regiment)
- Country: United States
- Allegiance: Union
- Branch: Naval Infantry/Infantry
- Engagements: Battle of Hatteras Inlet Batteries; Battle of Roanoke Island; Battle of Hampton Roads; Battle of New Bern; Battle of Tranter's Creek; Siege of Suffolk; Carolinas campaign

Insignia
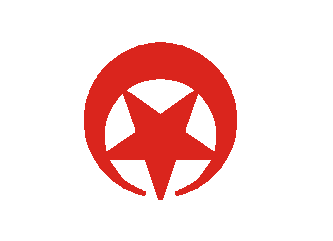
- 1st Division, VII Corps

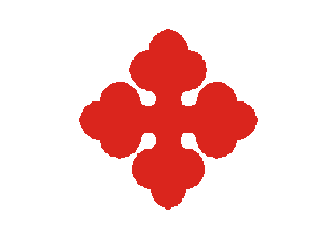
- 1st Division, XVIII Corps

The 99th New York Infantry Regiment, the "Union Coast Guard", "Bartlett's Naval Brigade", "Lincoln Divers", or "New York and Virginia Coast Guard", was organized as a naval infantry brigade, but mainly served as an infantry regiment of the Union Army during the American Civil War.

== Service ==
The 99th, known as the Union Coast Guard, or Bartlett's Naval Brigade, was organized by Colonel Washington Allon Bartlett in New York City, though it contained many men from Massachusetts, and mustered in May 1861. The brigade was to cruise along the Atlantic coast on provided gunboats. The organization left the state in May 1861, and went to Fortress Monroe, Virginia, where it unsuccessfully tried to report to Maj Gen Benjamin F. Butler. When Colonel Bartlett had a serious accident in August 1861, it was reorganized as an infantry regiment, and mustered into the service between June 1861 and March 1862.

Detachments of the regiment, operating as a coast guard, participated in skirmishes in coastal Virginia and the capture of forts at Cape Hatteras, North Carolina. It formed part of Burnside's North Carolina Expedition, and on the U. S. frigate Congress, took part in the naval engagement in Hampton Roads in March 1862. It served in detachments on army gunboats from August 1862; as a regiment at Suffolk, Virginia, in 7th Corps; at the White House in the Department of Virginia during the summer of 1863 under Brigadier General Isaac J. Wistar; and in the 18th Corps and District of North Carolina during 1864.

In June 1864 when terms of service expired, the original members mustered out, and the veterans and recruits consolidated into a battalion and finally just two companies in February 1865. In June 1865, the 132d Infantry not mustered out with their regiment were assigned to these two companies. The 99th was honorably discharged and mustered out July 15, 1865, at Salisbury, North Carolina.

== Total strength and casualties ==
During its service the regiment lost by death, killed in action, 2 officers, 27 enlisted men; of wounds received in action, 11 enlisted men; of disease and other causes, 3 officers, 161 enlisted men; total, 5 officers, 199 enlisted men; aggregate, 204; of whom 71 enlisted men died in the hands of the enemy.

== Commanders ==
- Colonel Washington Allon Bartlett
- Colonel David W. Wardrop
- Lieutenant Colonel Gustave B. Helleday
- Lieutenant Colonel Richard Nixon

== See also ==
- List of New York Civil War regiments
