= 194th New York Infantry Regiment =

194th New York Volunteer Infantry Regiment
- Active: March 2 - May 10, 1865
- Country: United States
- Allegiance: Union
- Branch: Union Army
- Type: Infantry
- Role: Organization and Mustering duties
- Engagements: None

Commanders
- Notable commanders: Colonel Joseph W. Corning; Lieutenant Colonel Lorenzo J. Jones

The 194th New York Volunteer Infantry Regiment also known as the 194th New York was an infantry regiment that served with the Union Army during the American Civil War. The regiment was the last to be mustered from the state, and never left the state, instead conducting organization and mustering duties at several recruitment camps.

== Organization ==
On January 27, Colonel Joseph W. Corning was given authority from the War Department to raise the regiment. It was organized at Elmira, New York, and mustered into service between March 2 and 27, 1865.

The companies of the regiment were originally recruited at:

- A - Horseheads, Elmira, Southport, Chemung, Veteran, Orange, Big Flats, Baldwin
- B - Southport, Tioga, Elmira, Dix, Candor, Triangle, Horseheads, Maine, Reading, and Union
- C - Holland, Baldwin, Elmira, Hume, Catlin, Veteran, New Hudson, Rochester, and Canandaigua
- D - Victor, Milo, Jerusalem, Benton, Potter, Italy, Seneca, Barrington, and Naples
- E - Jerusalem, Elmira, Caneadea, Potter, Angelica, Southport, Rochester
- F - Ischua, Allegany, Leon, Mansfield, Westfield, Randolph, Ellicottsville, Persia, and Cold Spring
- H - Syracuse, Rochester, Virgil, Marion, Walworth, Conquest, Macedon, Niles, Palmyra, Auburn, and Van Buren
- I - Rochester, Buffalo, Auburn, Elmira, Canandaigua, Greece, Clay, Niles, Mendon, and Irondequoit.

== Service ==
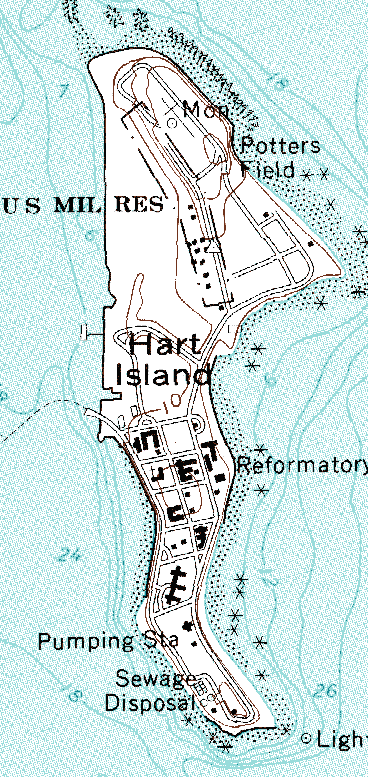
1966 Map of Hart's Island. The regiment was mustered out at Elmira and at Hart's Island (Pictured)

The regiment didn't leave the state and didn't take part in any active field service, and was instead limited to organization and mustering duties. The companies of the regiment were mustered out at respective locations, at Elmira and Hart's Island, between May 3 and May 10, 1865.

== Casualties ==
The regiment lost 7 men to disease.

== Commanders ==
- Colonel Joseph W. Corning
- Lieutenant Colonel Lorenzo J. Jones

== See also ==
- List of New York Civil War regiments
- New York in the American Civil War
