= 158th New York Infantry Regiment =

- Active: Mustered in: November 10, 1862; Mustered out: June 30, 1865
- Country: USA
- Allegiance: New York
- Branch: Army National Guard
- Type: Volunteer Regiment
- Size: Regiment
- Garrison/HQ: New York, New York
- Engagements: American Civil War

Commanders
- Colonel of the Regiment: James Jourdan; William H. McNary

The 158th New York Infantry Regiment was organized in Brooklyn as one of the regiments of the Empire-Spinola Brigade, and on August 13, 1862, James Jourdan was appointed to be its Colonel. It was mustered in the service of the United States for three years at Norfolk, Virginia. The companies were recruited principally: A, B, D, E, F, G, H, I and K at Brooklyn, and C at Manhattan, Jamaica, and New York City.

The 158th New York left the state on September 18, 1862; it served in Viele's Brigade at Norfolk, Virginia (September 1862), at Suffolk, Virginia (November 1862), at New Berne, North Carolina, 18th Corps (January 1863), in the 2nd Brigade, 5th Division, 18th Corps (February 1863), in Jourdan's Independent Brigade, Palmer's 1st Division, 18th Corps (May 1863), in the defenses of New Berne, N. C., Jourdan's Brigade, 1st Division, 18th Corps (July 1863), at Beaufort and Morehead, North Carolina (December 1863), in the 1st Brigade, 2nd Division, 18th Corps (August 1864), in the 4th Brigade, 1st Division, 24th Corps (December 1864), and in the 3rd Brigade, 1st Division, 24th Corps (March 1865); they were commanded by Col. William H. McNary.

The 158th New York was honorably discharged and mustered out June 30, 1865, at Richmond, Virginia. The men not to be mustered out with the regiment were transferred to the 100th Infantry.

== Casualties ==
- Killed in action: 2 officers and 29 enlisted men
- Died of wounds received in action: 20 enlisted men
- Died of disease and other causes: 83 enlisted men
- Total: 2 officers, 132 enlisted men
- Aggregate: 134 (5 enlisted men died in the hands of the enemy)
- Death by an explosion of torpedoes at Bachelor's Creek, North Carolina, May 26, 1864: 4 enlisted men

== See also ==
- List of New York Civil War regiments
