= Oneida Independent Company New York Volunteer Cavalry =

- Also Known as the Oneida New York Independent Cavalry Company
- Active: September 4, 1861 - June 13, 1865
- Country: United States
- Allegiance: (Union (American Civil War)) Union (New York (state)) New York
- Branch: Union Army
- Type: Cavalry
- Role: Escort, Guard duties, and also providing couriers and orderlies. (They also conducted picket, raiding, reconnaissance, patrol and provost duties)
- Size: 89 (Initial Muster-in strength); 198 (Note: As reported back to Adjutant General)
- Part of: Army of the Potomac
- Nickname: "Oneida Independent Company of Cavalry"
- Equipment: Colt 1851 Navy Revolver and Light Cavalry Sabres
- Engagements: Siege of Yorktown; Battle of Malvern Hill; Battle of Antietam; Battle of Fredericksburg; Battle of Chancellorsville; Battle of Gettysburg; Mine Run Campaign; Battle of the Wilderness; Battle of Spotsylvania Court House; Battle of Totopotomoy Creek; Battle of Cold Harbor; Siege of Petersburg; Appomattox Courthouse

Commanders
- Notable commanders: Captain Daniel P. Mann; Captain James E. Jenkins; Second Lieutenant Almond L. Clark

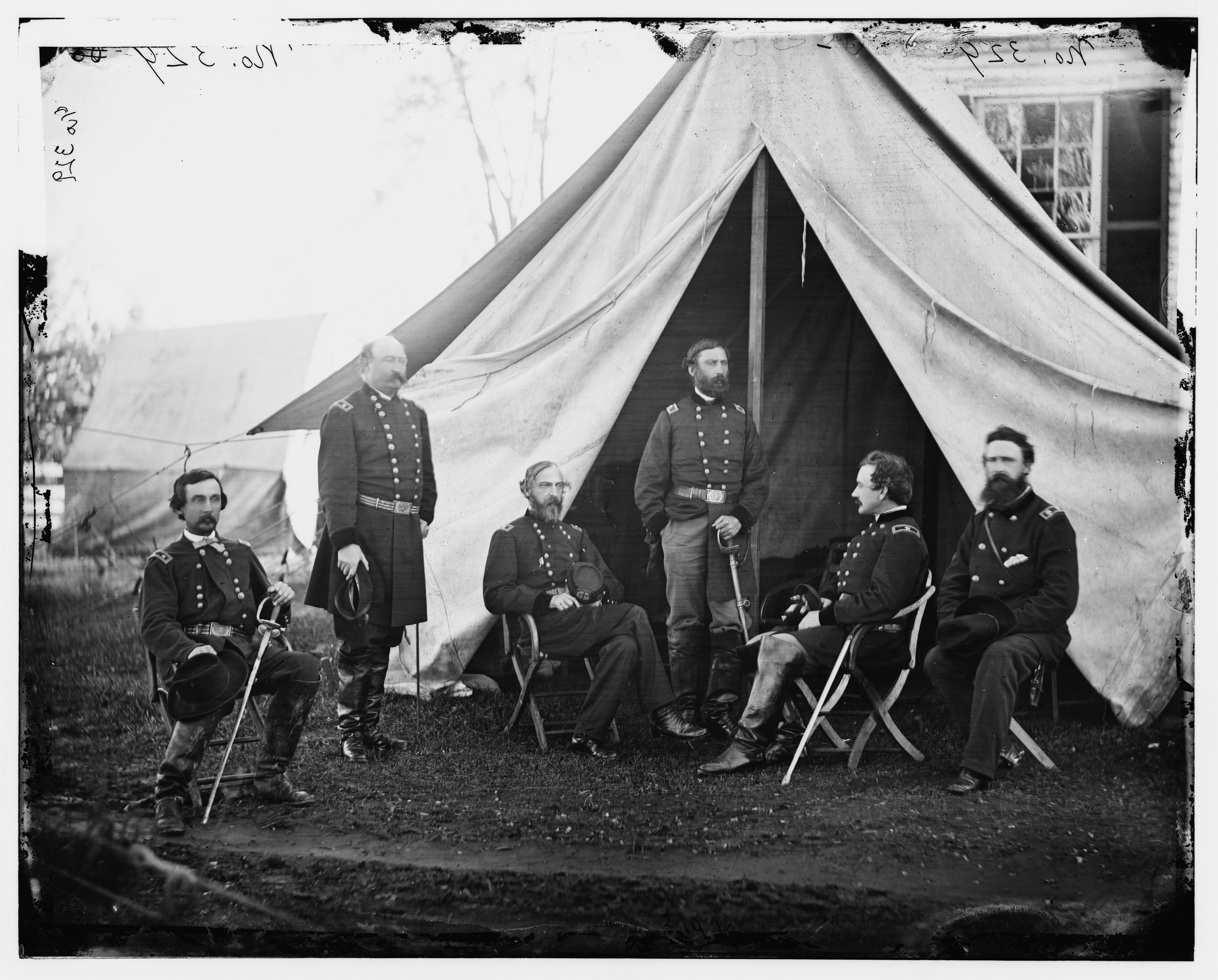
The company would be attached to the Headquarters of the Army of the Potomac, and would conduct escort duties for the generals.

The Oneida Independent Company New York Volunteer Cavalry, also known as the Oneida New York Independent Cavalry Company, was an independent cavalry company that primarily served in the headquarters of the Army of the Potomac, performing escort, guard duties, furnishing couriers. They also served as General George Meade's personal escort, delivering couriers and orderlies.

The company took part in most of the important battles, from the Siege of Yorktown to the Appomattox Campaign, and was the only independent-sized company to participate in the Civil War.

== Organization ==
The company was organized at Oneida, and mustered into service on September 4, 1861, for three years' service. under the command of Captain Daniel P. Mann. The company was recruited mainly from: Oneida, Salisbury, Stockbridge, Hamilton, Otisco, Eaton, Nelson Flatts, Vienna and Chittenango.

== Service ==
The company left the state in September, and on September 6, moved to Washington D.C where it was attached to Stoneman's Cavalry Command of the Army of the Potomac

In April, the company was assigned to the Headquarters of the Army of the Potomac. During the Battle of Antietam, Chancellorsville , and Gettysburg, the company conducted escort, guard duties, and also provided couriers and orderlies. And as time went on, they also conducted picket, raiding, reconnaissance, patrol, and provost duties.

At Gettysburg, the company brought 49 men to the field and didn't suffer any casualties.

In June 1864, a detachment of 22 men under Second Lieutenant Almond L. Clark was permanently assigned to General Grant's Headquarters at City Point, Virginia.

During September, the three-year enlistment periods ran out, and those, except veterans, were mustered out, and remained in service until June 13, 1865, when it was mustered out of service near Washington D.C.

== Affiliations and engagements ==
=== Organizational affiliations ===
During their service, the regiment was attached to various larger formations, such as:

- Attached to Stoneman's Cavalry Command, Army of the Potomac, to April, 1862
- At Headquarters, Army of the Potomac, as escort till June, 1865

=== Engagements ===
A list of the battles the regiment took part in:

- Siege of Yorktown
- Battle of Malvern Hill
- Battle of Antietam
- Battle of Fredericksburg
- Battle of Chancellorsville
- Battle of Gettysburg
- Mine Run Campaign
- Battle of the Wilderness
- Battle of Spotsylvania Court House (2 enlisted missing)
- Battle of Totopotomoy Creek
- Battle of Cold Harbor
- Siege of Petersburg
- Appomattox Courthouse

== Armaments ==
During 1862 and 1863, the regiment was primarily equipped with Colt Navy Revolvers, both old and new models, and light cavalry sabres, and the Company reported the Following Survey:

=== Fredericksburg ===
- 60 - Colt’s Navy, new and old models. Calibre .36
- 61 - Light Cavalry Sabres

=== Chancellorsville (Note: The company didn't take any losses in the previous battles, so it's the same.) ===
- 60 - Colt’s Navy, new and old models. Calibre .36
- 61 - Light Cavalry Sabres

== Casualties ==
The company lost 10 men to disease and 2 men to missing.

== Notable commanders ==
- Captain Daniel P. Mann
- Captain James E. Jenkins - mustered out with the regiment
- Second Lieutenant Almond L. Clark

== See also ==
- List of New York Civil War regiments
