= 1st New York Mounted Rifles Regiment =

1st Regiment New York Mounted Rifles
- Active: July 30, 1861, to September 6, 1865
- Country: United States
- Allegiance: Union
- Branch: Cavalry
- Engagements: Battle of Hampton Roads; Siege of Suffolk; Battle of Swift Creek; Fort Darling; Second Battle of Petersburg; Battle of Chaffin's Farm; Battle of Darbytown Road; Battle of Fair Oaks and Darbytown Road

Insignia
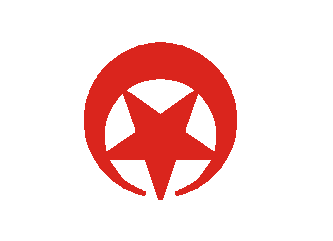
- VII Corps

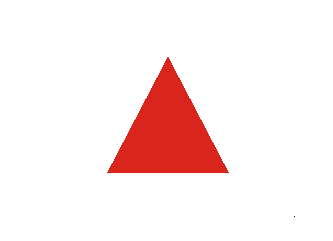
- IV Corps

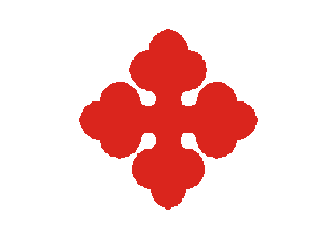
- XVIII Corps

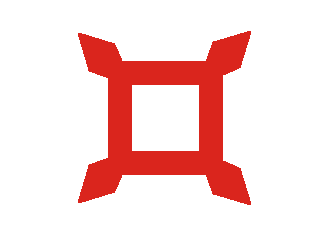
- X Corps

The 1st Regiment New York Mounted Rifles, sometimes designated 7th Regiment New York Volunteer Cavalry, was a cavalry regiment of the Union Army during the American Civil War.

== Service ==
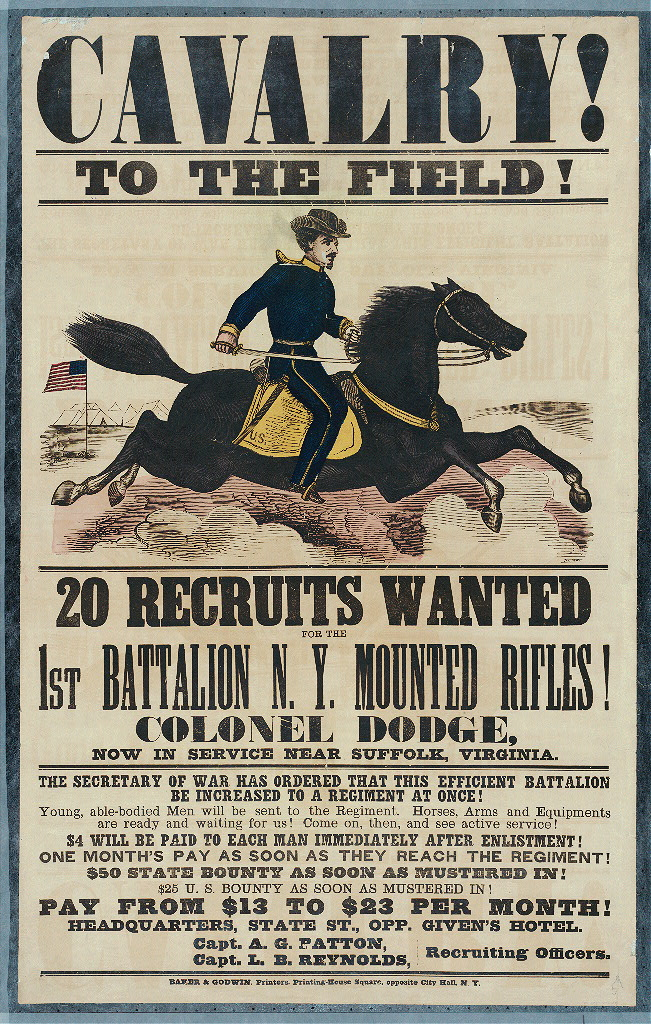
Recruiting poster of the 1st New York Mounted Rifles.

Companies organized and mustered in between July 1861 and September 1862, and served in the Department of Virginia (VII Corps and IV Corps) and Department of Virginia and North Carolina, principally at Fort Monroe, Norfolk and Suffolk, Portsmouth, Williamsburg and Yorktown, Virginia; in Wistar's Division, XVIII Corps, from January 1864; in the Cavalry, Army of the James, with the 3d Brigade, 1st Division, X Corps, from March 1864; a detachment as escort, headquarters Army of the James, from July 1864; unattached from August 1864; in the 3d Brigade of the Cavalry Division, Army of the James, until March 1865; again unattached to the close of the war; and at Fredericksburg, Virginia, from April 1865. Companies H and D served with the 10th Corps from June 1864; with XVIII Corps from August 1864.

July 17, 1864, 270 men of the 16th New York Heavy Artillery Regiment, who had volunteered to serve with the regiment, were transferred to it.

September 6, 1865, the regiment received the designation, 4th Regiment New York Provisional Cavalry, and its final record will be found under that head.

== Total strength and casualties ==
The regiment lost by death, killed in action, 1 officer, 18 enlisted men; of wounds received in action, 1 officer, 12 enlisted men; of disease and other causes, 4 officers, 125 enlisted men; total, 6 officers, 155 enlisted men; aggregate, 161; of whom 8 enlisted men died at the hands of the enemy.

== Commanders ==
- Colonel Charles C. Dodge
- Colonel Edwin Vose Sumner Jr.
- Lieutenant Colonel Benjamin F. Onderdonk

== See also ==
- List of New York Civil War regiments
