= 188th New York Infantry Regiment =

- New York state flag
- Active: October 1864 to July 1865
- Country: United States
- Allegiance: Union
- Branch: Army
- Type: Infantry
- Engagements: Battle of Hatcher's Run; Siege of Petersburg; Battle of Five Forks

The 188th New York Infantry Regiment was an American Civil War infantry regiment from New York that served from October 1864 through July 1865 in the Union Army.

Colonel James R. Chamberlain, succeeded by Col. John McMahon, received authority, September 14, 1864, to recruit this regiment, with headquarters at Rochester, where it was organized and mustered in the service of the United States for one year, October 4, 5, 7, 10 and 22, 1864; except Company A, originally Company C, 183d Infantry, which was mustered in at Elmira September 24, 1864.

== Formation ==
The regiment was formed in upstate New York, drawing men from Monroe, Ontario, Livingston, Yates, and Steuben counties for one year of service. Company A of the 188th New York was mustered in at Elmira, Chemung County, New York, on September 24, 1864. Company A was originally Company C of the 183rd New York Infantry. Companies B through J were mustered into federal service on October 4, 1864, at Rochester, Monroe County, New York. Company K did not join the regiment until November.

The companies were recruited principally: A at Villenova, Allegany, Madison, Yorkshire, Freedom and Mansfield; B at Rochester, Avon, Phelps, Victor, Italy, Penn Yan, Naples and Geneseo; C at Italy, Jerusalem, Rochester, Milo, Avon, Middlesex and Springtwater; D at Springwater, York, Sparta, Avon, Potter, Portage, North Dansville, Geneseo, Leicester and Mt. Morris; E at Livonia, Potter, Portage, Richmond, Avon, Farmington, Jerusalem, Springwater, Seneca, York and Leicester; F at Rochester, Corning, Canandaigua, Hornby and Tuscarora; G at Springwater, Avon, Gorham, Mt. Morris, Canandaigua, Sparta, Middlesex, Leicester, Italy and Barrington; H at Rochester, Sparta, Avon, Dansville and Springwater; I at Avon, Nunda, Rochester, Dansville, Livonia, Groveland, Conesus, Mt. Morris, Phelps and York; and K at Rochester, North Dansville, Conesus, Groveland, Torry, Milo, Avon and Middlesex.

== Federal service ==
The 188th New York left the state to join the Army of the Potomac on October 13, 1864. Initially, only seven companies left the state but company K followed in November. The army was before Petersburg, Virginia, at that time. The regiment was placed in 2nd Brigade, 1st Division, V Corps then under Major General Gouverneur Warren. The 188th New York remained in this assignment for its entire federal service.

On October 27, less than a month after first muster, the regiment went into battle at Hatcher's Run near the Weldon Railroad. The regiment suffered 7 dead and between 39 and 46 wounded (depending on reports).

On December 8, 1864, the regiment participated on a raid to Hicksford, Virginia, where two soldiers were taken prisoner.

February 6 and 7, 1865 saw the regiment at Hatcher's Run again. During this battle the regiment suffered 5 dead, 21 wounded, and 3 missing.

The Appomattox campaign saw the regiment fight with its corps at White Oak ridge, Gravelly Run and Five Forks, when its casualties aggregated 45 killed and wounded. The 188th New York also participated in the final assault on Petersburg and was present at Appomattox Station on April 9 when General Lee surrendered the Army of Northern Virginia. According to the Rochester Democrat and Chronicle, it reported that the 188th was the regiment that "busted up the confederacy." They were given the honor of posting guard duty around the court house while Lee surrendered the confederacy to Grant.

== Deactivation ==
The regiment was mustered out of federal service on July 1, 1865, at Washington, D.C., with less than the planned one year of service.

== Regiment commanders ==
- September 14 - October 12, 1864 - Colonel James R. Chamberlain
- October 12, 1864, to July 1, 1865 - Colonel John E. McMahon

=== Other Officers ===
- Lieutenant Colonel Isaac Doolittle
- Major Christopher C. Davison
- Adjutant Orville Curtiss
- Quartermaster Henry E. McMahon
- Surgeon O. Sprague Paine
- Assistant Surgeon Gideon O. Spencer - October 10, 1864, to February 13, 1865
- Assistant Surgeon Charles E. Hill - May 1 to July 1, 1865

== Battle summary ==
- October 27, 1864 - Hatcher's Run, Virginia
- December 8, 1864 - Warren's Raid, Virginia
- February 6–7, 1865 - Hatcher's Run, Virginia
- March 19, 1865 - White Oak Ridge, Virginia
- March 29, 1865 - Gravelly Run, Virginia
- March 29, 1865 - Lewis Farm, Virginia
- March 30, 1865 - Five Forks, Virginia
- March 31, 1865 - Gravelly Run, Virginia
- April 1, 1865 - Five Forks, Virginia
- April 2, 1865 - Fall of Petersburg
- April 9, 1865 - Appomattox Courthouse (not a battle)

=== Casualties ===
- Officers killed or mortally wounded: 1
- Officers Died of Disease, Accidents, etc.: 0
- Enlisted Men Killed or Mortally Wounded: 37
- Enlisted Men Died of Disease, Accidents, etc.: 53
- Enlisted Men Missing: 4

== Bibliography ==
- Phisterer, Frederick (1912). New York in the War of the Rebellion 1861-1865. Vol. 5 (3rd ed.). Albany, New York: NY State Adjutant General's Office and J. B. Lyon Company. pp. 4499 (five text volumes, one index volume).

== See also ==
- List of New York Civil War regiments
