= 141st New York Infantry Regiment =

- Active: August 14, 1862 - June 8, 1865
- Country: United States
- Allegiance: Union
- Branch: Infantry
- Engagements: Siege of Suffolk; Battle of Missionary Ridge; Atlanta campaign Battle of Resaca; Battle of Dallas; Battle of New Hope Church; Battle of Allatoona; Battle of Marietta; Battle of Kennesaw Mountain; Battle of Peachtree Creek; Siege of Atlanta; Sherman's March to the Sea; Carolinas campaign Battle of Bentonville

The 141st New York Infantry Regiment was an infantry regiment in the Union Army during the American Civil War.

== Service ==
The 141st New York Infantry was organized at Elmira, New York, beginning August 14, 1862 and mustered in for three years service on September 11, 1862 under the command of Colonel Samuel G. Hathaway Jr..

The regiment was attached to VIII Corps, Middle Department, to October 1862. 2nd Brigade, Abercrombie's Division, Defenses of Washington, to February 1863. 2nd Brigade, Abercrombie's Division, XXII Corps, to April 1863. 1st Brigade, 3rd Division, VII Corps, Department of Virginia, to May 1863. 2nd Brigade, 2nd Division, IV Corps, to July 1863. 2nd Brigade, 3rd Division, XI Corps, Army of the Potomac, to October 1863, and Army of the Cumberland to April 1864. 1st Brigade, 1st Division, XX Corps, Army of the Cumberland, to June 1865.

The 141st New York Infantry mustered out June 8, 1865. Recruits and veterans were transferred to the 60th New York Infantry.

== Detailed service ==
Left New York for Middle Department September 15, 1862. Duty in the defenses of Washington, D.C. until April 1863. Moved to Norfolk, then to Suffolk, Va., April 15–17. Siege of Suffolk April 17-May 4. Siege of Suffolk raised May 4. Moved to West Point May 5, then to Yorktown May 31. Dix's Peninsula Campaign June 24-July 7. Expedition to Bottom's Bridge July 1–7. Moved to Washington, D.C., July 10–11. March in pursuit of Lee to Berlin, Md., July 13–24. Duty along the Orange & Alexandria Railroad until September. Movement to Bridgeport, Ala., September 24-October 3. Duty there and in Lookout Valley until November. Reopening Tennessee River October 26–29. Battle of Wauhatchie, Tenn., October 28–29. Chattanooga-Ringgold Campaign November 23–27. Orchard Knob November 23. Tunnel Hill November 24–25. Missionary Ridge November 25. March to the relief of Knoxville, Tenn., November 27-December 17. Loudoun December 4–5. Duty in Lookout Valley until May 1864. Atlanta Campaign May 1 to September 8. Demonstrations on Rocky Faced Ridge May 8–11. Battle of Resaca May 14–15. Near Cassville May 19. Advance on Dallas May 22–25. New Hope Church May 25. Battles about Dallas, New Hope Church, and Allatoona Hills May 26-June 5. Ackworth June 5. Operations about Marietta and against Kennesaw Mountain June 10-July 2. Pine Hill June 11–14. Last Mountain June 15–17. Gilgal or Golgotha Church June 15. Muddy Creek June 17. Noyes' Creek June 19. Kolb's Farm June 22. Assault on Kennesaw June 27. Ruff's Station, Smyrna Camp Ground, July 4. Chattahoochie River July 5–17. Peachtree Creek July 19–20. Siege of Atlanta July 22-August 25. Operations at Chattahoochie River Bridge August 26-September 2. Occupation of Atlanta September 2-November 15. March to the sea November 15-December 10. Siege of Savannah December 10–21. Carolinas Campaign January to April 1865. Thompson's Creek, near Chesterfield, S.C., March 2. Thompson's Creek, near Cheraw, S.C., March 3. Averysboro, N.C., March 16. Battle of Bentonville March 19–21. Occupation of Goldsboro March 24. Advance on Raleigh April 9–13. Moccasin Swamp April 10. Occupation of Raleigh April 14. Bennett's House April 26. Surrender of Johnston and his army. March to Washington, D.C., via Richmond, Va., April 29-May 20. Grand Review of the Armies May 24.

== Casualties ==
The regiment lost a total of 249 men during service; 4 officers and 71 enlisted men killed or mortally wounded, 2 officers and 172 enlisted men died of disease.

== Commanders ==
- Colonel Samuel G. Hathaway Jr.
- Colonel John W. Dininny
- Colonel William K. Logie
- Colonel Andrew J. McNett

== See also ==
- List of New York Civil War regiments
- New York in the Civil War
