= 4th New York Provisional Cavalry Regiment =

4th New York Provisional Cavalry
- New York flag
- Active: July 21/September 6, 1865, to November 29, 1865
- Country: United States
- Allegiance: Union
- Branch: Cavalry

The 4th New York Provisional Cavalry was a cavalry regiment that served in the Union Army at the end of the American Civil War.

== Service ==
Under special orders of the War Department, dated May 8, 1865, this organization was formed by the consolidation of the 3rd Cavalry and the 1st Mounted Rifles; the consolidation took place July 21, 1865, and September 6, 1865, and the new regiment was designated as above.

The companies were formed from the 1st Mounted Rifles and the 3d Cavalry, and Col. Edwin Vose Sumner Jr., of the 1st Mounted Rifles, was placed in command of the regiment, which was honorably discharged and mustered out, under his command, November 29, 1865, at City Point, Virginia, having lost by death, of disease and other causes, ten enlisted men.

== See also ==
- List of New York Civil War regiments
