= 18th New York Infantry Regiment =

- Active: May 13, 1861 – May 28, 1863
- Country: United States
- Allegiance: Union
- Branch: Infantry
- Engagements: Battle of Fairfax Court House; Battle of Blackburn's Ford; First Battle of Bull Run; Siege of Yorktown; Seven Days Battles; Battle of Gaines's Mill; Battle of White Oak Swamp; Battle of Malvern Hill; Battle of South Mountain; Battle of Antietam; Battle of Fredericksburg; Battle of Chancellorsville

The 18th New York Infantry Regiment (a.k.a. "New York State Rifles") was an infantry regiment in the Union Army during the American Civil War.

== Service ==
The 18th New York Infantry was organized May 13, 1861, at Albany, New York and mustered in on May 17, 1861, for two years' service under the command of Colonel William A. Jackson. On June 21, 1861 they were presented with a regimental flag with the motto "Rally around it," by a group of women from Albany.

The regiment was attached to Davies' Brigade, Miles' Division, McDowell's Army of Northeast Virginia, June to August 1861. Franklin's Brigade, Division of the Potomac, to October 1861. Newton's Brigade, Franklin's Division, Army of the Potomac, to March 1862. 3rd Brigade, 1st Division, I Corps, Army of the Potomac, to May 1862. 3rd Brigade, 1st Division, VI Corps, to May 1863.

The 18th New York Infantry mustered out of the service on May 28, 1863. Men who enlisted for three years' service were transferred to the 121st New York Volunteer Infantry on May 11, 1863.

== Detailed service ==
Left New York for Washington, D.C., June 19. Reconnaissance on Fairfax Road, July 14, 1861. Advance on Manassas, Virginia, July 16–21. Fairfax Court House, July 17. First Battle of Bull Run, July 21. Duty in the defenses of Washington, D.C., until March 1862. Skirmish at Springfield Station, October 3, 1861. Advance on Manassas, Virginia, March 10–15, 1862. McDowell's advance on Fredericksburg, Virginia, April 4–12. Ordered to the Virginia Peninsula, April 22. Siege of Yorktown, April 24 – May 4 (on transports). West Point, May 7–8. Seven Days Battles before Richmond, June 25 – July 1. Gaines's Mill, June 27. White Oak Swamp and Glendale, June 30. Malvern Hill, July 1. At Harrison's Landing until August 16. Movement to Fort Monroe, then to Centreville, August 16–28. In works at Centreville, August 29–31. Cover Pope's retreat to Fairfax Court House, September 1. Maryland Campaign, September 6–22. Crampton's Pass, South Mountain, September 14. Battle of Antietam, September 16–17. Duty in Maryland until October 30. Movement to Falmouth, Virginia, October 30 – November 19. Battle of Fredericksburg, December 12–15. "Mud March", January 20–24, 1863. At Falmouth until April. Chancellorsville Campaign, April 27 – May 6. Operations at Franklin's Crossing, April 29 – May 2. Maryes Heights, Fredericksburg, May 3. Salem Heights, May 3–4. Banks' Ford, May 4. Regiment moved to New York May 16.

== Casualties ==
The regiment lost a total of 71 men during service; four officers and 34 enlisted men killed or mortally wounded, one officer and 32 enlisted men died of disease.

== Commanders ==
- Colonel William A. Jackson – died November 11, 1861, in Washington, D.C. due to typhoid fever.
- Colonel William H. Young – resigned August 14, 1862, due to illness.
- Colonel George Ranney Myers

== See also ==
- List of New York Civil War regiments
- New York in the Civil War
- www.18thnyi.com
