= 132nd New York Infantry Regiment =

- Active: October 4, 1862 (mustered in) to June 29, 1865 (mustered out)
- Country: United States
- Allegiance: Union
- Branch: Infantry
- Engagements: Battle of New Bern (1864); Carolinas campaign Battle of Wyse Fork

Insignia
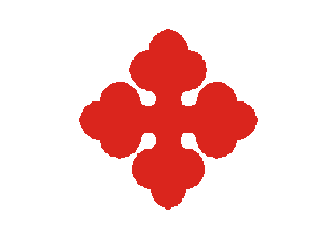
- 5th Division, XVIII Corps

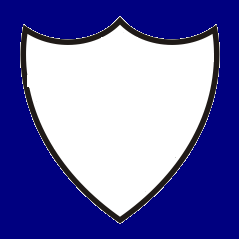
- 2nd Division, XXIII Corps

The 132nd New York Infantry Regiment, the "Second Regiment, Spinola's Empire Brigade"; or "Hillhouse Light Infantry", was an infantry regiment of the Union Army during the American Civil War.

== Service ==
The regiment was raised in July 1862, and was finally organized at East New York by consolidating with the Thurlow Weed Guards as part of the Spinola Brigade, and nearly all the men recruited for the 53d N. Y. Volunteers, second organization; it was mustered in for three years October 4, 1862, at Washington, DC; June 15, 1865, the men not to be mustered out with the regiment were transferred to the 99th Infantry.

The companies were recruited principally:

- A at New York City, Brooklyn and Newtown;
- B, F, I and K at New York City, Brooklyn and Staten Island;
- C and E at New York City;
- D at Brooklyn, Buffalo, Lewiston and the reservations of the Allegany, Cattaraugus and Tuscarora Indians;
- G at Suspension Bridge, Buffalo, New York City and Brooklyn; and
- H at New York city, Harlem, Buffalo and Kingston.

The regiment left the state and served at and near Washington from September, 1862; at Norfolk, Virginia, then Suffolk, Virginia, from October, 1862; in the 1st Spinola Brigade, 5th Division, 18th Corps, from December, 1862; in the 2d Brigade, 5th Division, 18th Corps, from March, 1863; unattached, on outpost duty, near New Bern, North Carolina, from May, 1863; in Palmer's Brigade, Peck's Division, 18th Corps, from January, 1864; in Department of Virginia and North Carolina, from April, 1864; in the Provisional Corps, North Carolina, from March I, 1865; in the 1st Brigade, 2d Division, 23d Corps, from April 2, 1865; at Salisbury, North Carolina, from May, 1865; and was honorably discharged and mustered out, June 29, 1865, at Salisbury.

The regiment spent nearly its entire term of service in North Carolina, engaged in outpost and garrison duty. The regiment took part in engagements at various locations in the state, and in the Carolinas campaign at Wise's Forks, Snow Hill, and Bennett's House. The regiment sustained its worst losses at the battle of New Bern in February, 1864, when it lost 91 killed, wounded and missing. During this battle, three companies defended the bridge on Bachelor's Creek (a tributary of the Neuse River) against three successive attacks of the enemy, but were finally forced to retire when the enemy was reinforced, after 4 hours of hard fighting. The 132nd is credited with saving New Bern from capture on this occasion. Lieut. Arnold Zenette, the only commissioned officer killed, fell in this action. At the battle of Wise's Forks the regiment lost 24 killed, wounded and missing.

Company D was known as the Tuscarora Company, being led by Lieutenant Cornelius C. Cusick, a chief of the Tuscarora.

== Total strength and casualties ==
The regiment left the state about 900 strong; during its service the regiment lost by death, killed in action, 1 officer, 6 enlisted men; of wounds received in action, 7 enlisted men; of disease and other causes, 1 officer, 159 enlisted men; total, 2 officers, 172 enlisted men; aggregate, 174; of whom 71 enlisted men died in the hands of the enemy, and 28 through the accidental explosion of torpedoes at Bachelor's Creek, North Carolina, May 26, 1864. Among the troops were a number of men of color enlisted as cooks in 1863 and 1864 at New Berne, N.C.

== Commanders ==
- Colonel Peter J. Claassen
- Lieutenant Colonel Charles E. Prescott
- Lieutenant Colonel George H. Hitchcock

== See also ==
- List of New York Civil War regiments
- Battle of New Bern (1864)
- Carolinas campaign
- Battle of Wyse Fork
