= 192nd New York Infantry Regiment =

192nd New York Volunteer Infantry Regiment
- Active: March 13 to April 8, 1865 - August 28, 1865
- Country: United States
- Allegiance: Union
- Branch: Union Army
- Type: Infantry
- Role: Post-war duty
- Part of: 3rd brigade, 3d division, Army of the Shenandoah.
- Engagements: None

Commanders
- Notable commanders: Colonel Nathan G. Axtell; Lieutenant Colonel Barent Van Buren; Major Solyman G. Hamlin

The 192nd New York Volunteer Infantry Regiment, also known as the 192nd New York, was an infantry regiment that served with the Union Army during the American Civil War. It was one of the last regiments raised by the state itself.

== Organization ==
On January 14, 1865, Colonel Nathan G. Axtell, formerly the "fighting chaplain" of the 30th New York, received authority to raise the regiment for one, two and three year's service; it was organized at Albany, New York, and was mustered into service between March 13 to April 8, 1865.

The companies were originally recruited at:

- A and B - Albany and Utica
- C -- Troy, Albany and Utica
- D -- Schenectady, Kingston and Poughkeepsie
- E -- Plattsburg, Poughkeepsie, Troy, Jamaica
- G -- Schenectady, Albany, Troy, Goshen, Kingston
- H -- Schenectady, Plattsburg, Poughkeepsie, Troy, Albany
- I -- Schenectady, Plattsburg, Poughkeepsie, Kingston, Troy, New York City
- K -- Tarrytown, Jamaica, Kingston, Troy, Albany

== Service ==
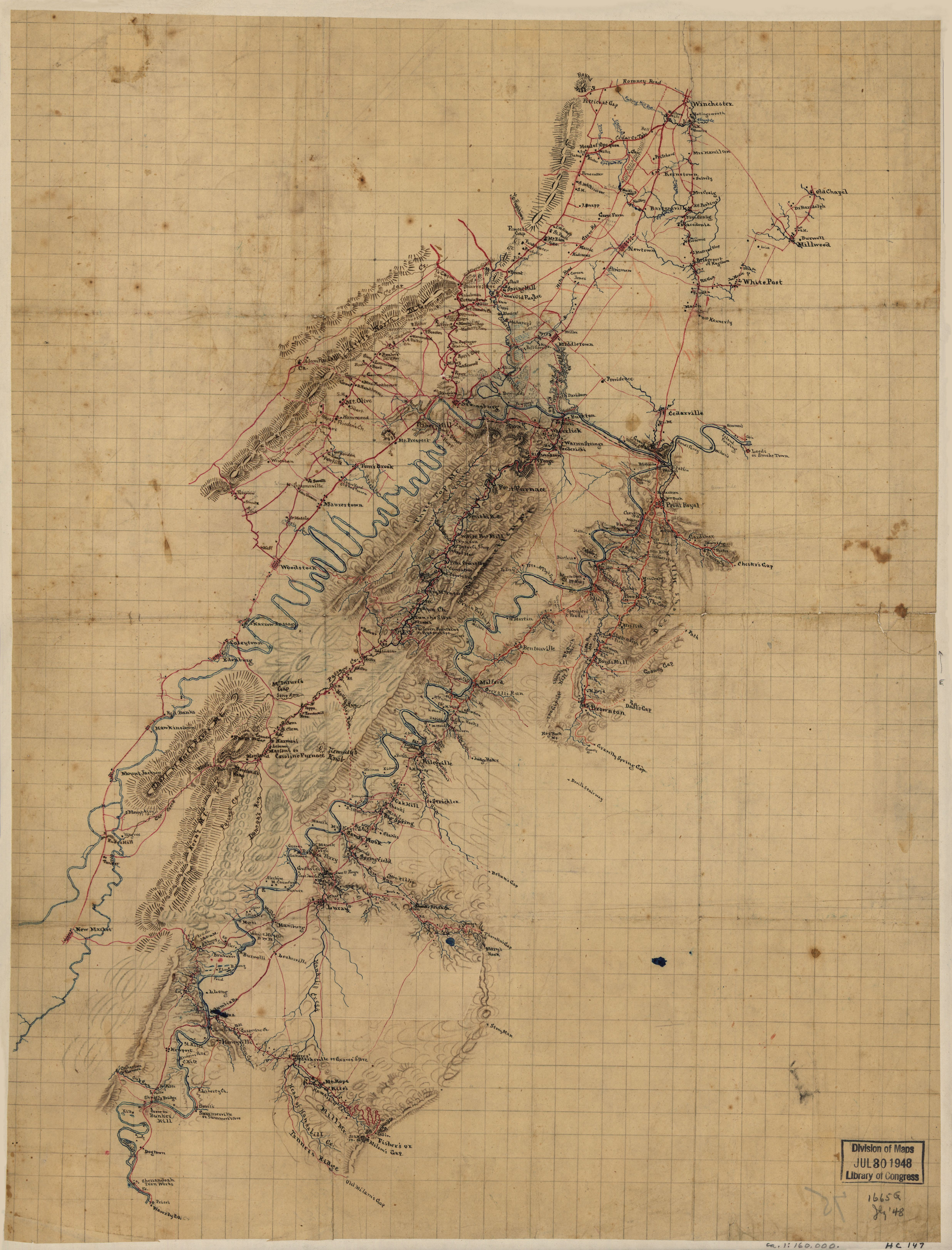
Map of the Shenandoah Valley. Since the regiment was late by the time they took the field, they instead conducted Post-war duty in the Shenandoah Valley.

The regiment left the state in detachments in March and April, 1865, and was attached to the 3rd Brigade, 3rd Division of the Army of the Shenandoah. But due to the timing of the organization, by the time the regiment took the field, the war had practically ended, and were instead engaged in post-war duty in the Shenandoah Valley.

The regiment was mustered out of service at Cumberland, Maryland on August 28, 1865.

== Notable commanders ==
- Colonel Nathan G. Axtell
- Lieutenant Colonel Barent Van Buren
- Major Solyman G. Hamlin

== Casualties ==
The regiment lost 26 enlisted men to disease.

== See also ==
- List of New York Civil War regiments
- New York in the Civil War
