= 7th New York Cavalry Regiment =

- Active: November 23, 1861 (left NYS) to March 31, 1862
- Country: United States
- Allegiance: Union
- Branch: Cavalry

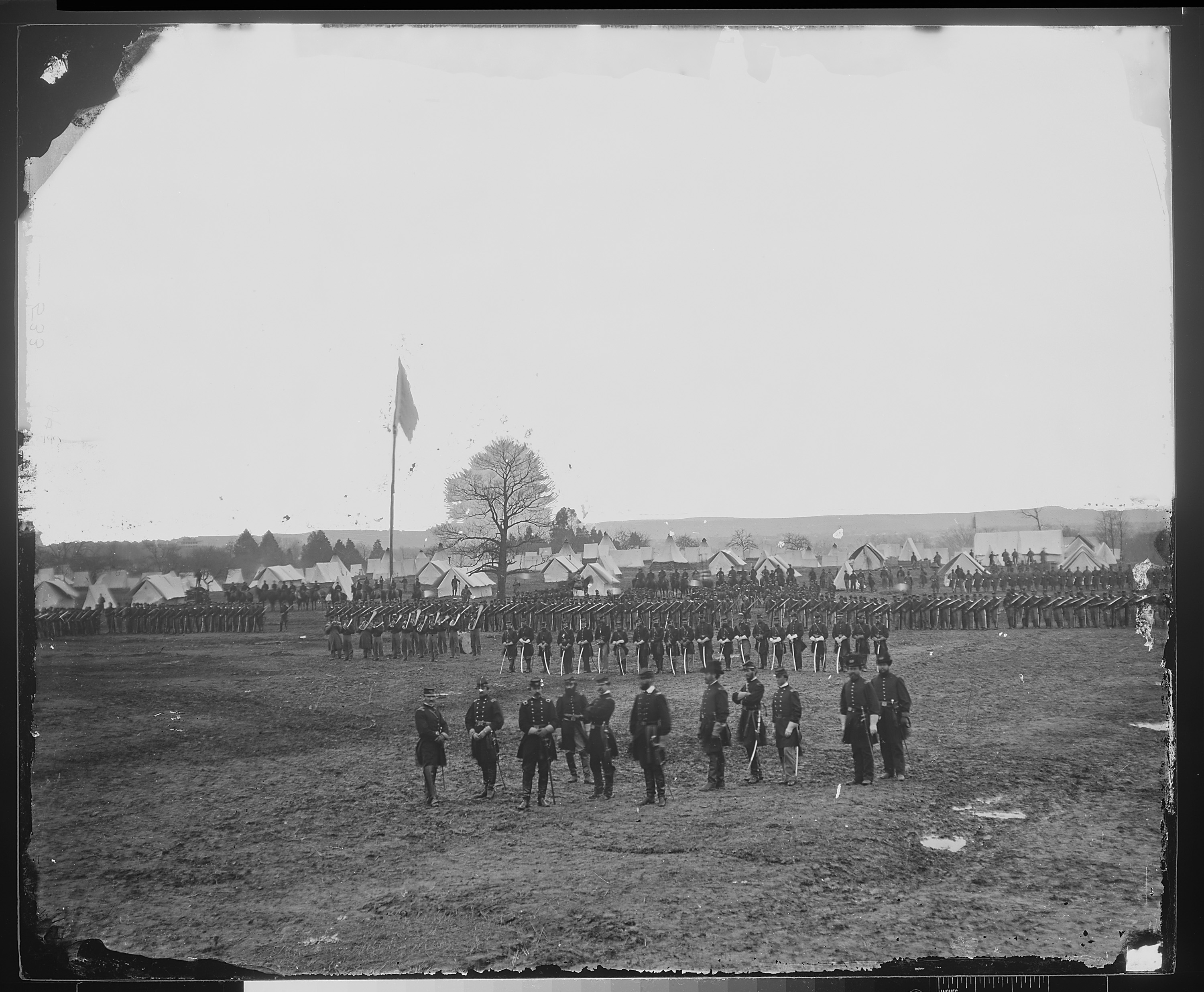
Camp scene, 7th. N.Y. Cavalry

The 7th New York Cavalry Regiment, the "Northern Black Horse Cavalry" and more properly designated 1st Regiment New York Mounted Rifles, was a cavalry regiment of the Union Army during the American Civil War.

== Service ==
This regiment was organized at Troy, New York to serve three years. November 18, 1861, it was designated by the State authorities as the 2nd Regiment of Cavalry; by the War Department it was designated 7th N. Y. Volunteer Cavalry, under which designation it was mustered out of service, and was, therefore, so recorded. The companies were mustered in the service of the United States:

- A at Salem, November 6;
- B at Sandy Creek, November 6;
- C, D, E, F and H at Troy, November 6; and G at Elmira, November 8, 1861.

There were only eight companies organized and these were recruited principally:

- A at Salem;
- B at Sandy Creek;
- C at Troy, Hoosick Falls, Schenectady, Berlin, Petersburgh and Grafton;
- D at Troy, Ogdensburgh, Newburgh, Saugerties and Goshen;
- E at Troy, Lowville, Albany and Carthage;
- F at Troy, Ballston, Broadalbin, Gloversville and Mayfield;
- G at Elmira, Lockport and Troy;
- H at Troy, Boonville, Ballston, Schulyerville, Nassau and Pittstown.

The regiment left the State November 23, 1861, and served near Washington, D. C., until March 31, 1862, when, not having been mounted, it was honorably discharged and mustered out.

== Total strength and casualties ==
During its service it lost by death, of disease, seven enlisted men.

== Commanders ==
- Colonel Andrew J. Morrison

== See also ==
- List of New York Civil War regiments
