= 53rd New York Infantry Regiment =

53rd New York Volunteer Infantry Regiment
- Active: 1861 – 1862
- Country: (United States) Union States of America
- Branch: Union Army
- Type: Infantry
- Size: 2 Battalions
- Nicknames: "D'Epineuil's Zouaves" "Poughkeepsie Boys"
- Engagements: American Civil War; Battle of Hatteras Inlet Batteries; Battle of Roanoke Island

The 53rd New York Volunteer Infantry Regiment, also known as D'Epineuil's Zouaves or the Poughkeepsie Boys, was an infantry unit of the Union Army organised in New York City for service in the American Civil War.

== Background ==
The 53rd New York regiment was formed by 31 year old Lionel Jobert D'Epineuil who arrived from the Second French Empire, and received permission to form a "Regiment of New York Frenchmen". After much convincing, D'Epineuil was granted a provisional rank of Colonel.

Within the regiment, a full company of natives from the Tuscarora Reservation in Western New York was formed. By the time the regiment was at full strength, it consisted of two battalions of 850 men each.

The regiment's uniform was very elaborate compared to other regiments, it was based on the 6th Regiment of Zouaves of the French Army (6éme Régiment de Zouaves), the uniform consisted of the following: red fez cap with long yellow tassel, dark blue jacket trimmed with bright yellow braid, blue sash, yellow, and black leather leggings and canvas gaiters.

== Service ==
From 27 August to 15 November 1861 the 53rd New York Volunteer Infantry Regiment was organised in New York City. Though only half filled, on 18 November the regiment moved for the District of Columbia, and from there moved to Annapolis, Maryland. On arrival in Maryland the regiment joined Parke's (3rd) Brigade part of Burnside's North Carolina Expeditionary Corps.

The regiment would remain in Annapolis until 3 January 1862 when it moved with Burnside's expedition into North Carolina where it participated during the Battle of Hatteras Inlet Batteries and later the Battle of Roanoke Island between 7 January and 8 February. Although a detachment only served during the battle, this would be the sole major action of the regiment. After the expedition, the regiment remained on duty at Fort Monroe, Virginia, later, Annapolis, Maryland, and later the District of Columbia until March.

On 21 March 1862, with the exception of A Company, the regiment was mustered out of federal service, effectively disbanding it. (Note: There is some debate on why the regiment was mustered out, but the most logical reason was D'Epineuil had lied, and never had served in the French Army, or any armed forces for that matter.) A Company was transferred to the 17th New York Infantry Regiment as that regiment's G Company, though the lineage wasn't continued.

During the regiment's service, 1 officer and 3 enlisted men were killed and mortally wounded, and 7 enlisted men were killed by disease, leaving a total of 11.

== Uniform ==
The regiment's uniform was a Zouave uniform. They wore the distinctive short Zouave jacket with yellow trim and matching vest underneath. They wore a red wool fez with gold trim and a gold tassel. Under their waist belt, they wore a sky blue sash and sky blue Zouave pantaloons with yellow lace and trim. These were tucked into their leather and canvas white gaiters.
