= 163rd New York Infantry Regiment =

- Active: July 11, 1862 – January 20, 1863
- Country: United States
- Allegiance: Union
- Branch: Infantry
- Engagements: Battle of Fredericksburg

The 163rd New York Infantry Regiment (a.k.a. "3rd Regiment, Empire Brigade") was an infantry regiment in the Union Army during the American Civil War.

== Service ==
The 163rd New York Infantry was organized at New York City, New York beginning July 11, 1862, and mustered in on October 10, 1862, in Washington, D.C., under the command of Lieutenant Colonel John B. Leverick.

The regiment was attached to Carroll's Brigade, Whipple's Division, Defenses of Washington, to November 1862. 2nd Brigade, 3rd Division, III Corps, Army of the Potomac, to January 1863.

The 163rd New York Infantry ceased to exist on January 20, 1863, when it was consolidated with the 73rd New York Volunteer Infantry.

== Detailed service ==
Left New York for Washington October 5, 1862. Moved to Pleasant Valley, Maryland, October 18–19, 1862. Moved toward Warrenton, Virginia, October 24 – November 16. Moved to Falmouth November 18–24. Battle of Fredericksburg, Virginia, December 12–15, Duty at Falmouth, until January 20, 1863.

== Casualties ==
The regiment lost a total of 26 men during service; 3 officers and 15 enlisted men killed or mortally wounded, 8 enlisted men died of disease.

== Commanders ==
- Lieutenant Colonel John B. Leverick
- Major James J. Byrne – commanded at the Battle of Fredericksburg

== See also ==
- List of New York Civil War regiments
- New York in the Civil War
