= List of Medal of Honor recipients for the Third Battle of Winchester =

The Third Battle of Winchester or Battle of Opequon, was fought in Winchester, Virginia, on September 19, 1864, during the Valley Campaigns of 1864 in the American Civil War. Fourteen Union Army enlisted men and one officer were awarded the Medal of Honor for gallantry during the battle.

The Medal of Honor was created during the American Civil War and is the highest military decoration presented by the United States government to a member of its armed forces. The recipient must have distinguished themselves at the risk of their own life above and beyond the call of duty in action against an enemy of the United States. Due to the nature of this medal, it is commonly presented posthumously.

== Recipients ==
| Image | Name | Rank | Unit |
|---|---|---|---|
| — | Chester B. Bowen | Corporal | 1st New York Dragoons |
| — | Gabriel Cole | Corporal | 5th Michigan Cavalry |
| — | Henry W. Downs | Sergeant | 8th Vermont Infantry |
| — | Henry M. Fox | Sergeant | 5th Michigan Cavalry |
| — | Andrew J. Lorish | Commissary Sergeant | 1st New York Dragoons |
| — | Alphonso M. Lunt | Sergeant | 38th Massachusetts Infantry |
| — | Joel H. Lyman | Quartermaster Sergeant | 9th New York Cavalry |
| — | Patrick H. McEnroe | Sergeant | 6th New York Cavalry |
| — | George E. Meach | Farrier | 6th New York Cavalry |
| — | George Reynolds | Private | 9th New York Cavalry |
| — | Peter J. Ryan | Private | 11th Indiana Infantry |
| | James M. Schoonmaker | Colonel | 14th Pennsylvania Cavalry |
| — | Conrad Schmidt | First Sergeant | 2nd U.S. Cavalry |
| — | Charles H. Seston | Sergeant | 11th Indiana Infantry |
| — | John T. Sterling | Private | 11th Indiana Infantry |
