= Henry M. Fox =

United States Army Medal of Honor recipient

- Medal of Honor recipient
- Born: November 15, 1844; Trumbull, Ashtabula County, Ohio, US
- Died: March 3, 1923 (aged 78); Middlebury, Elkhart, Indiana, US
- Military career
- Allegiance: United States; Union
- Branch: United States Army; Union Army
- Service years: 1862 - 1865
- Rank: 2nd Lieutenant
- Unit: 5th Michigan Volunteer Cavalry Regiment
- Conflicts: American Civil War
- Awards: Medal of Honor

Henry M. Fox (November 15, 1844 – March 3, 1923) was a Union soldier during the American Civil War, and a Medal of Honor recipient.

== Early life ==
Fox was born on 15 November 1844 in Ohio to Peter Fox and Elizabeth Miller. He married Hannah Burdick in Coldwater, Michigan on 1 June 1867. He had five daughters and one son.

== Military career ==
Fox enlisted in company M, 5th Michigan Cavalry on August 12, 1862, at Coldwater, Michigan for a period of three years.

Mustered August 30, 1862, Fox was promoted to corporal August 2, 1863, first sergeant January 1, 1865, and to second lieutenant April 4, 1865.

Mustered out at Fort Leavenworth, Kansas, June 19, 1865, Fox lived in Union, Michigan, after the war.

== Death ==
Fox died of Influenza in Elkhart, Indiana, on 3 March 1923 at the age of 78.

== Medal of Honor ==
On September 19, 1864, during the Third Battle of Winchester at Winchester, Virginia, Fox captured the Confederate battle flag.

Henry M. Fox's official Medal of Honor citation reads:

Rank and organization: Sergeant, Company M, 5th Michigan Cavalry.
Place and date: At Winchester, Va., 19 September 1864.
Entered service at: Coldwater, Mich.
Born: 1844, Trumbull, Ohio.
Date of issue: 27 September 1864.
Citation:

The President of the United States of America, in the name of Congress, takes pleasure in presenting the Medal of Honor to Sergeant Henry M. Fox, United States Army, for extraordinary heroism on 19 September 1864, while serving with Company M, 5th Michigan Cavalry, in action at Winchester, Virginia, for capture of flag.

Sgt. Fox was one of two members of the 5th Michigan Cavalry to receive the Medal of Honor for this action. The other was Corporal Gabriel Cole.

== Flag to War Department ==
On September 28, 1864 Henry along with 6 other men presented the captured flags to the Secretary of War at the War Department.

- George Reynolds Company I, 6th New York Cavalry
- Patrick McEnmore, 6th New York Cavalry
- Corporal Chester B. Bowen, Company I, New York dragoons
- George E. Mesch, 56th New York Cavalry
- Gabriel Cole, Company I, 5th Michigan Cavalry
- Andrew J. Lorish Regimental commissary Sergeant 1st New York Cavalry

After the presentation the Secretary stated:

"I return to you, gentlemen, the thanks of this department, for the valor and gallantry you have displayed in the capture of these flags. I will direct the Adjutant general to furnish you with medals, with your name inscribed thereon, and they will be sent to your commanders for delivery to you, as soon as they can be prepared. The Adjutant General will take charge of these flags and place them among the archives of the Department."

== See also ==
- List of Medal of Honor recipients
- List of American Civil War Medal of Honor recipients: A–F
