= Thomas Jones Thorp =

Union Army brevet brigadier general (1837–1915)

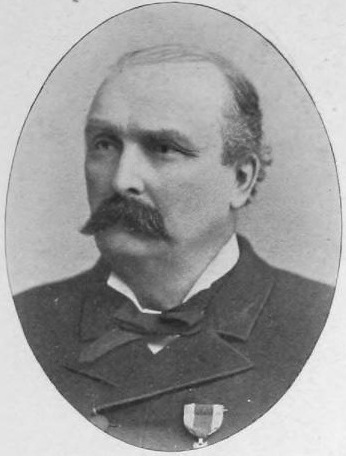
- Thorp in 1893
- Born: 26 May 1837; Granger, New York, US
- Died: 26 July 1915 (aged 78); Corvallis, Oregon, US
- Burial place: River View Cemetery, Portland, Oregon, US
- Alma mater: Union College
- Spouse: Mandana Coleman Major (m. 1862–1915)
- Children: 5
- Military career
- Allegiance: Union (American Civil War)
- Service: Union Army
- Service years: 1861–1865
- Rank: Colonel (Union Army); Brigadier General (Brevet)
- Unit: United States Volunteers
- Commands: Company E, 85th New York Infantry Regiment; 130th New York Infantry Regiment; 19th New York Cavalry Regiment; 1st New York Dragoons Regiment
- Wars: American Civil War; Defenses of Washington; Siege of Yorktown; Battle of Williamsburg; Battle of Seven Pines; Battle of Malvern Hill; Battle of the Wilderness; Battle of Todd's Tavern; Battle of Trevilian Station
- Other work: Attorney; Inventor

Thomas J. Thorp (26 May 1837 – 26 July 1915) was a Union Army officer during the American Civil War. Originally from New York, at the start of the war he commanded Company E, 85th New York Infantry Regiment, and he was later appointed second-in-command of the 130th New York Infantry Regiment. A veteran of numerous battles and engagements, he attained the rank of colonel and received a promotion to brigadier general by brevet as a commendation of his wartime service.

Thorp was born in Granger, New York and graduated from Union College in 1861. He joined the Union Army before that year's graduation ceremony and received his diploma while in the field with his unit. An organizer of the 85th New York Infantry Regiment, in September 1861 he was commissioned as a captain and assigned to command the regiment's Company E. He took part in battles including the Defenses of Washington, Siege of Yorktown, Battle of Williamsburg, and Battle of Seven Pines. He was wounded at Seven Pines and later contracted malaria, so he returned to New York to recuperate.

While recovering from his wound and illness, Thorp aided in organizing the 130th New York Infantry Regiment and was appointed its second-in-command with the rank of lieutenant colonel. Battles in which he took part included Malvern Hill, Wilderness, Todd's Tavern, and Trevilian Station, and Thorp acted as commander on numerous occasions. In June 1864, he was taken as a prisoner of war following the Trevilian Station fight. He was held in Macon, Georgia, Savannah, Georgia, and Charleston, South Carolina; he attempted several escapes and nearly succeeded when he jumped from a train while between Savannah and Charleston. He was paroled in March 1865 and was recuperating in New York when the war ended in April. Thorp was promoted to colonel in March 1865; in July 1889, the effective date of this promotion was changed to December 1864. Wounded a total of five times, he was discharged in June 1865 and in October 1865, he received the brevet of brigadier general of United States Volunteers in recognition of the superior service he rendered during the war.

After the war, Thorp farmed in Livingston County, New York and studied engineering and mechanics, which resulted in him obtaining patents for several inventions over the next several decades, including improved horse collars and fenceposts. In 1871, he was a resident of Thorp, Michigan when he was elected to serve as clerk of Wexford County. In the early 1870s, he began a career as a school teacher and principal in Buffalo. He later studied law, attained admission to the bar, and practiced in Cadillac, Michigan. As a resident of Chicago and later of Flagstaff, Arizona, he continued to invent; in Flagstaff, he was a sheep rancher. Thorp later resided in Corvallis, Oregon, where he died on 26 July 1915. Initially interred at Crystal Lake Cemetery in Corvallis, after his wife's death his remains were moved to River View Cemetery in Portland, Oregon.

== Early life ==
Thomas Jones Thorp (Note: Thorpe's middle name is sometimes incorrectly given as "James" and his last name is sometimes incorrectly spelled as "Thorpe".) was born in Granger, New York on 26 May 1837, a son of Montgomery Thorp and Bethiah (Jones) Thorp. His siblings included Alexander Kelsey Thorp, who was killed in action during the war and Simeon Montgomery Thorp, a Kansas politician and government official who was killed by Confederates during the Lawrence Massacre. Thorp was raised and educated in Granger and attended the preparatory school at Alfred University. He then began attending Union College; he was scheduled to graduate in 1861, but joined the military before the formal ceremony. As a result of his early departure, Thorp received his Bachelor of Arts diploma in the field while serving with his army unit.

=== Family ===
On 6 September 1862, Thorp married Mandana Coleman Major in Portage, New York. They were married until his death and were the parents of five children, three of whom reached adulthood. A graduate of Alfred University, during the war Mrs. Thorp's singing was a major attraction at Union recruiting drives and rallies, and she worked as a nurse while traveling with her husband's regiment. After the war, she rode with her husband at the head of the 130th New York Volunteer Infantry during the Grand Review of the Armies and was active in the Woman's Relief Corps.

== Start of career ==
After leaving college in the spring of 1861, Thorp assisted in raising a company in Granger; it was accepted for service as Company E, 85th New York Infantry Regiment in August, and in September Thorp enlisted for three years as a private. In November, he was commissioned as a captain and appointed to command the company. Thorp took part in the Defenses of Washington and all the battles of the Peninsula campaign. He was wounded in the left thigh and below the left knee during the Battle of Seven Pines and during his convalescence he contracted malaria.

Thorp was discharged in August 1862 so he could assist in organizing the 130th New York Infantry Regiment and he was appointed second-in-command with the rank of lieutenant colonel. He took part in several engagements, including the Battle of the Wilderness, Battle of Todd's Tavern, and Battle of Trevilian Station. He acted as commander on several occasions, including after the unit was converted to the 19th New York Cavalry Regiment and later the 1st New York Dragoons Regiment. Thorp was captured at Trevilian Station in June 1864 and held as a prisoner of war at camps near Macon, Georgia, Savannah, Georgia, and Charleston, South Carolina. On Independence Day, 4 July 1864, Union soldiers at the Macon facility organized speeches and celebrations. Thorp's speech on the right of the people to crush the rebellion roused the prisoners to such an extent that Confederate officers entered the camp and halted him.

During his imprisonment, Thorp attempted several escapes, including one that nearly succeeded when he jumped from a train between Savannah and Charleston; he was recaptured only because his pursuers used bloodhounds to track him. Thorp was paroled in March 1865. He then returned to New York to recuperate, and he was there when the war ended in April 1865. He took part in the Grand Review of the Armies in May and received his discharge in June. Thorp was promoted to colonel in March 1865, and in July 1889 this promotion was made retroactive to December 24, 1864. Wounded five times in total, in October 1865, he received the brevet of brigadier general of United States Volunteers in recognition of the superior service he rendered during the war.

== Continued career ==
Following the Civil War, Thorp became the owner and operator of a farm in Livingston County, New York. In 1871, he moved to Thorp, Michigan, a now-abandoned town in South Branch Township. He was elected clerk of Wexford County, and his wife served as his deputy. In the early 1870s, he relocated to Buffalo, New York, where he worked as a school teacher and principal, after which he returned to Michigan. Thorp later studied law, was admitted to the bar and practiced in Cadillac. He began studying engineering and mechanics while farming in New York and he subsequently patented several inventions while living in Michigan and Chicago. Among his creations were a variation on the horse collar, running gear for wagons, an improved fencepost, a fencepost manufacturing machine, a bicycle, an electric trolley, and a steeper for brewing tea and coffee.

In the late 1880s, Thorp became a resident of Arizona Territory, where he raised sheep and sold wool near Flagstaff while continuing to invent. As a result of his prominence in Flagstaff, the city's Thorpe Park was named for him. In the early 1900s, he relocated to Corvallis, Oregon. He was a longtime member of the Grand Army of the Republic and the Military Order of the Loyal Legion of the United States, and he continued these associations while living in Oregon. He died in Corvallis on 26 July 1915 and was initially interred at Crystal Lake Cemetery in Corvallis. After his wife's death, he was buried next to her at River View Cemetery in Portland.
