= Mandana Coleman Thorp =

Union Army nurse and singer (1843–1916)

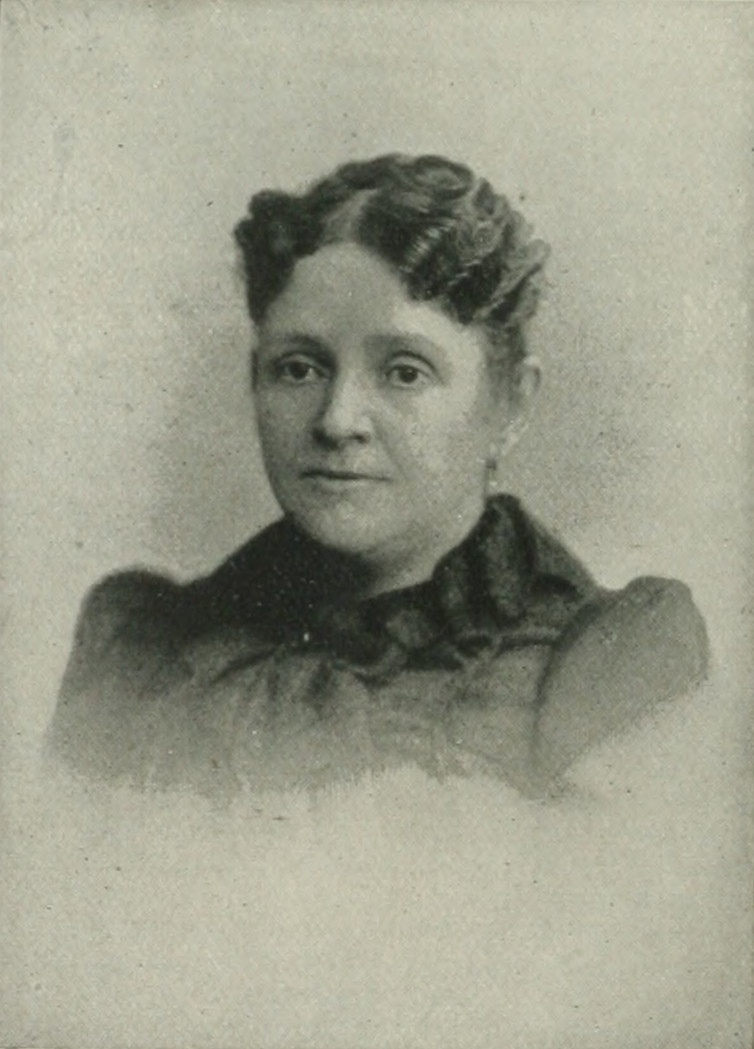
- "A Woman of the Century"
- Born: Mandana Coleman Major; January 25, 1843; Almond, New York, U.S.
- Died: July 7, 1916 (aged 73); Portland, Oregon, U.S.
- Resting place: River View Cemetery, Portland
- Education: Alfred University
- Occupations: American Civil War nurse, singer; patriot; public official
- Spouse: Thomas Jones Thorp (m. 1862; died 1915)
- Children: 5
- Relatives: Moses Van Campen

Mandana Coleman Thorp (née, Major; January 25, 1843 – July 7, 1916) was an American Civil War nurse and singer. She rallied the Union Army troops by singing battle hymns and national airs, and tended to the sick and injured. In 1865, at the Grand Review of the Armies in Washington, D.C., she rode at the head of the 1st New York Dragoons Regiment. After the war, she moved west with her husband, Colonel Thomas Jones Thorp, and worked as a public official in Northern Michigan. Around 1900, they settled in Oregon, where she was active in the Woman's Relief Corps.

== Background and education ==
Mandana Coleman Major was born in Karr Valley, Almond, Allegany County, New York, January 25, 1843. She was the daughter of Colonel John Major. Her mother was a descendant of Major Moses Van Campen, a Revolutionary patriot. She had at least two siblings, a sister, Mrs. Emma Crary, and a brother, Newton Major.

Thorp was taught at home by her mother and later received a liberal education at Alfred University, from which she graduated.

== Career ==
=== American Civil War ===
The stirring events before and during the Civil War called out the sentiment of patriotic persons and the musical talents of Miss Major were actively enlisted from the start of the war. The national airs and the stirring battle hymns were sung by her at nearly all of the meetings held in that part of New York state.

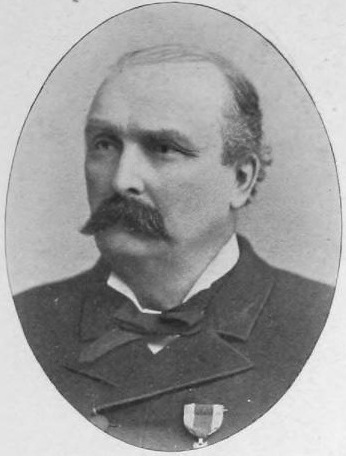
Thomas J. Thorp in 1893

At the close of the first peninsula campaign, in the summer of 1862, President Lincoln requested the Governor of the State of New York to raise and equip two regiments at once for service in front of General Lee, whose forces were invading Pennsylvania. It was during the organization of those two regiments the patriotism of Allegany, Livingston and Wyoming counties was brought into activity. During the months of July and August, 1862, the loyal people of those communities filled the ranks of the 130th and 136th New York Infantry Regiments. After attending scores of war meetings, urging with song every stalwart person to rally for the sentiments of Union, Miss Major married Lieutenant colonel Thomas Jones Thorp at the military rendezvous on the banks of the Genesee River in Portage, New York, on September 6, 1862.

Lt. Col. Thorp had up to that time participated in every battle of the Potomac Army, and, although severely wounded at the battle of Fair Oaks and battle of Malvern Hill, had refused to stay in the hospital. By permission of the Secretary of War, Col. Thorp was assigned to the new regiment, which became the famous 1st New York Dragoons Regiment, by an order of the War Department, after the battle of Gettysburg.

During the years of the war, Mrs. Thorp rendered devoted service in the ranks with other women of that period in their efforts in gathering and distributing every needed comfort for the wounded and sick in camp and in hospital. She joined the regiment of her adoption and remained with it during the Siege of Suffolk, Virginia. She rode with full eagle at the head of the regiment in the grand review in Washington, D.C. in 1865 at the close of the war. She never suggested to her husband that, as he had been several times wounded and made a prisoner of war, he could consistently leave the service, but she cheered him in the camp and field and, finally, with the star above the eagle, they rode side by side in the Second Brigade, First Division of the Cavalry Corps of the Army of the Potomac.

=== Post war ===
After the war, Mandana and Thomas Thorp raised a family and worked together in various enterprises. In Northern Michigan, where they were pioneers, she was made deputy clerk and register of deeds. In the Arizona Territory, she assisted her husband in the sheep and wool industry, often guarding the camp located in the valley of the Little Colorado River, adjacent to the reservation of the Navajo Nation, while her husband was absent on business. Going further west, they lived for a time in Forest Grove, Oregon, where her husband served as principal of a school. In 1899 or 1900, they settled in Corvallis, Oregon.

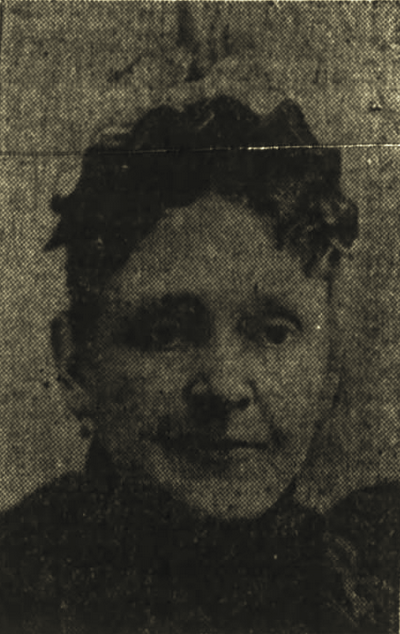
1907

Mandana Thorp kept up her old associations as a member of the Woman's Relief Corps (W.R.C.). During the 20-odd years she lived in Oregon, she took a prominent role in the W.R.C. Three times, she was sent to the national gathering of the W.R.C. as a delegate from Oregon where she was a member of Ellsworth No. 7: 1897 (Buffalo, New York), 1902 (Washington, D.C.), and 1907 (Saratoga Springs, New York). As past president of the W.R.C., she was an Oregon delegate to the 20th annual encampment of the Grand Army of the Republic (G.A.R.) and the W.R.C. in June 1904. Several times, she served as state inspector for the corps; she also held the title of Patriotic Instructor of Oregon.

She was also prominent in the Woman's Christian Temperance Union.

== Final years ==
The Thorps were members of the Presbyterian Church, and staunch Republicans politically.

Mr. Thorp died in July 1915. (Note: Various sources refer to Mr. Thorp's military title as "Colonel", "Brigadier General", and "General". At the close of the civil war, he was breveted brigadier general.) For the last year of her life, Mrs. Thorp lived in Portland, Oregon with her daughter, Bessie. Mandana Thorp died in Portland, July 7, 1916, of heart disease. Three children, including Simeon and Annie, preceded her in death; while two, Montgomery and Bessie, survived Mrs. Thorp.

Thorp was buried at River View Cemetery, Portland. Headstones were added to her grave and that of her husband in 2013, by the Sons of Union Veterans of the Civil War.
