= Kim (1950 film) =

1950 adventure film directed by Victor Saville

- 1950 Theatrical Poster
- Directed by: Victor Saville
- Written by: Helen Deutsch; Leon Gordon; Richard Schayer
- Based on: Kim; 1901 novel by Rudyard Kipling
- Produced by: Leon Gordon
- Starring: Errol Flynn; Dean Stockwell; Paul Lukas; Robert Douglas; Thomas Gomez; Cecil Kellaway; Arnold Moss; Laurette Luez
- Cinematography: William V. Skall
- Edited by: George Boemler
- Music by: André Previn
- Production company: Metro-Goldwyn-Mayer
- Distributed by: Loew's, Inc.
- Release date: December 7, 1950
- Running time: 113 minutes
- Country: United States
- Language: English
- Budget: $2,049,000
- Box office: $5,348,000

Kim is a 1950 adventure film made in Technicolor by Metro-Goldwyn-Mayer. It was directed by Victor Saville and produced by Leon Gordon from a screenplay by Helen Deutsch, Leon Gordon and Richard Schayer, based on the classic 1901 novel of the same name by Rudyard Kipling.

The film starred Errol Flynn, Dean Stockwell, and Paul Lukas. The music score was by André Previn. The film was shot on location in Rajasthan and Uttar Pradesh, India, with some parts being in present-day Uttarakhand, as well as the Alabama Hills near Lone Pine, California, due to its resemblance to the Khyber Pass. Of particular interest is the location filming at La Martiniere College in Lucknow.

The film is set within the Great Game, a political and diplomatic confrontation between the British Empire and the Russian Empire. In the film, an orphan boy is trained as a spy by agents of the British Raj, and tasked with maintaining surveillance of two Russian spies.

== Plot ==
Kim, an orphan boy in 1885 India during the British Raj, occasionally works for his friend Mahbub Ali, a roguish horse trader who is also a secret agent for the British. Mahbub Ali becomes aware of a Russian-backed plot to invade India from Afghanistan.

Meanwhile, Kim encounters an elderly Buddhist lama from Tibet, who is on a quest to find the "River of the Arrow", whose waters will cleanse him spiritually. Mahbub Ali has the young boy become the kindly priest's "chela" or disciple so that he can deliver a message to Colonel Creighton, Mahbub Ali's superior. On the journey along the Grand Trunk Road, the two travelers grow to love each other.

One day, British soldiers set up camp. Kim notices that their regimental flag depicts a red bull on a green field, which matches a prophecy left him by his now-deceased father, so he sneaks into the encampment. He is taken for a thief by a sentry. During the ensuing scuffle, his captors discover documents Kim possesses which show that he is actually the son of Kimball O'Hara, an Irish soldier who had served in the regiment. The lama decides that Kim should live among his own kind to be educated (despite the boy's resistance) and pays for his tuition at the finest boarding school in India. The boy chafes at the school's many restrictions, but eventually settles down.

Mahbub Ali convinces Colonel Creighton that the boy has the potential to become a wonderful spy; to that end, Kim receives extra training from the shopkeeper Lurgan during the first part of his summer vacation.

While traveling in disguise, Kim overhears a plot to assassinate Mahbub Ali and warns him, saving his life. He is then reunited with his lama and sent to notify Hurree Chunder to keep an eye on two Russian spies posing as surveyors. When he finds Chunder murdered, he takes on the mission himself without informing anyone. When news of Chunder's death reaches the British, Colonel Creighton sends Mahbub Ali to take Chunder's place. Kim talks the Russians into hiring him as their servant. An emissary meets with the Russians. The newcomer becomes suspicious of Kim and forces him onto a narrow ledge on a cliff to try to get the truth from him. The Russians beat the lama. Mahbub Ali tosses the emissary off the cliff, rescues Kim and takes the interlopers at gunpoint. When a small Russian force approaches, the spies attempt to overpower him, forcing him to kill them. Then he and Kim start a rockslide which buries the approaching Russians. Afterward, the injured lama has a vision of his river, stumbles to it, and dies, contented.

== Cast ==
- Errol Flynn as Mahbub Ali, the Red Beard
- Dean Stockwell as Kim
- Paul Lukas as Lama
- Robert Douglas as Colonel Creighton
- Thomas Gomez as Emissary
- Cecil Kellaway as Hurree Chunder
- Arnold Moss as Lurgan Sahib
- Reginald Owen as Father Victor
- Laurette Luez as Laluli
- Richard Hale as Hassan Bey
- Roman Toporow as The Russian
- Ivan Triesault as The other Russian
- Edward Wallace as Boy who ran

== Production ==
=== Earlier proposed versions ===
MGM originally announced the film in 1938 as a vehicle for Freddie Bartholomew and Robert Taylor but World War II saw this put on hold.

In 1942 it was reactivated to star Mickey Rooney, Conrad Veidt (as Red Lama) and Basil Rathbone, from a script by Leon Gordon and produced by Victor Saville. However this was postponed out of fear of offending Indians and also war-time allies the Russians, who were the villains.

=== Development ===
In 1948 the Indian government approved the film and the Cold War meant it was permissible to have Russian villains. In January 1949 the project was reactivated as a vehicle for MGM's child star Dean Stockwell. Errol Flynn was signed in September.

Paul Lukas and Flynn went to India but all scenes involving Dean Stockwell were shot in Hollywood. Flynn left for India in November after attending a Royal screening of That Forsyte Woman in London.

The song "D'Ye Ken John Peel" was chosen as the musical leitmotif for scenes depicting the Presidency armies as predecessors of the British Indian army.

=== Shooting ===
Locations used in the film included La Martiniere Lucknow (depicted as St. Xavier's College) in Lucknow, the horse market at the Kashmir Gates, Sirala, and the Himalayan foothills and the Khyber Pass. Doubles were used for Dean Stockwell and the characters of Huree Babu, Creighton Sahib and Lurgan Sahib (these hadn't been cast at the time of filming).

The unit returned to MGM in January 1950 to shoot the rest of the movie on the backlot.

== Reception ==
=== Box office ===
The movie was successful at the box office: according to MGM records the movie earned $2,896,000 in the U.S. and Canada and $2,465,000 in other markets, making it one of the studio's more popular films of the year. It was one of the most popular films at the French box office in 1951, with admissions of 2,514,860. According to Filmink magazine, it was "the biggest gross of any Flynn movie during its initial release (not counting for inflation). Clearly in the right role and the right movie he remained a potent box office draw. "

It made an overall profit of $1,064,000.

== Radio adaptation ==
Kim was presented on Lux Radio Theatre on February 18, 1952. The one-hour adaptation featured Errol Flynn and Dean Stockwell in their roles from the film.
