= Charles H. Seston =

Union Army soldier in the American Civil War

- Born: 1840; New Albany, Indiana
- Died: September 19, 1864; Winchester, Virginia
- Burial place: Fairview Cemetery, New Albany, Indiana
- Military career
- Allegiance: United States
- Branch: United States Army; Union Army
- Service years: 1861–1864
- Rank: Sergeant
- Unit: 11th Indiana Infantry
- Conflicts: American Civil War • Battle of Opequon
- Awards: Medal of Honor

Charles H. Seston (1840 – September 19, 1864) was a Union Army soldier killed in action during the American Civil War. He posthumously received the Medal of Honor for gallantry during the Battle of Opequon more commonly called the Third Battle of Winchester, Virginia, on September 19, 1864.

Seston joined the army from Indiana in August 1861.

== Medal of Honor citation ==
"The President of the United States of America, in the name of Congress, takes pride in presenting the Medal of Honor (Posthumously) to Sergeant Charles H. Seston, United States Army, for extraordinary heroism on 19 September 1864, while serving with Company I, 11th Indiana Infantry, in action at Winchester, Virginia, for gallant and meritorious service in carrying the regimental colors."

Sgt. Seston's body was returned to Indiana for burial. In addition to Seston, two other soldiers of the 11th Indiana Infantry received the Medal of Honor for this action. The others were Pvt. Peter J. Ryan and Pvt. John T. Sterling.

== See also ==
- List of Medal of Honor recipients
- List of American Civil War Medal of Honor recipients: Q–S
