= Battle of Cooke's Spring =

- Part of the Apache Wars
Date	March 9, 1857
Location	Cooke's Spring, Black Range, New Mexico 32.463°N 107.649°W
Result	United States victory

Belligerents
United States	Apache

Commanders and leaders
(United States) Alfred Gibbs	Unknown

Strength
17 cavalry 2 militia	8 warriors

Casualties and losses
1 wounded	6 killed 1 wounded

The Battle of Cookes Spring was a skirmish which took place between Apache raiders and the United States Army on March 9, 1857. Apache raiders were tracked through the frontier by a party of U.S. Army cavalry who intercepted the native warriors at Cooke's Spring in the Black Range of New Mexico.

== Battle ==
On March 8, 1857, eight Chiricahuas stole horses from an American deputy surveyor named Mr. Garretson who reported the incident to the garrison of Fort Fillmore. In response, First Lieutenant Alfred Gibbs led a detachment of 16 cavalrymen and 2 armed civilians on the Apache trail which crossed the Rio Grande about ten miles north of Doña Ana and headed northwest.

Hours of pursuing went on until Gibbs caught up with the natives at noon the following day next to the northernmost slopes of the Mimbres Mountains within the Black Range. The Americans came within sight of the natives an hour and a half later where they saw a warrior 50 yards away who appeared to be coming towards them, and 7 others resting next to Cook's Spring, an arroyo one mile from the mountains. The Americans dismounted and started the battle with a volley of musket fire before remounting for a charge. Three warriors were wounded but continued to run like "wild turkeys" according to Gibbs. When the Apache spotted the approaching soldiers they fled for high ground, but the Americans were right behind them. The Apache chief, either Itan or Monteras, was one of the wounded, but he rallied his men throughout the battle and led counter charges against Gibbs' command.

During the fighting, the chief was moving to attack a corporal named Collins who was on foot after having his horse shot out from under him, but the chief was intercepted by Gibbs who shot him a fifth time. The chief thrust a lance into Gibbs' side, but just after he was hit again by an enlisted men and died after receiving ten gunshot wounds. Gibbs was wounded, but he was able to stop some of the lance's force with his right arm. Gibbs was losing blood, so he dismounted to prevent falling from his horse and gave it to Corporal Collins with orders to continue the fight.

The cavalrymen caught up with the remaining Apaches and killed five more of them at the foothills of the mountains. One warrior escaped though he was badly wounded and presumed to have died after the encounter. Gibbs was the only American casualty. The stolen property was recovered by Garretson who was one of the two armed civilians involved, and several mules were also captured.
