= Smith H. Hastings =

American Civil War Medal of Honor recipient

Smith Hugh Hastings
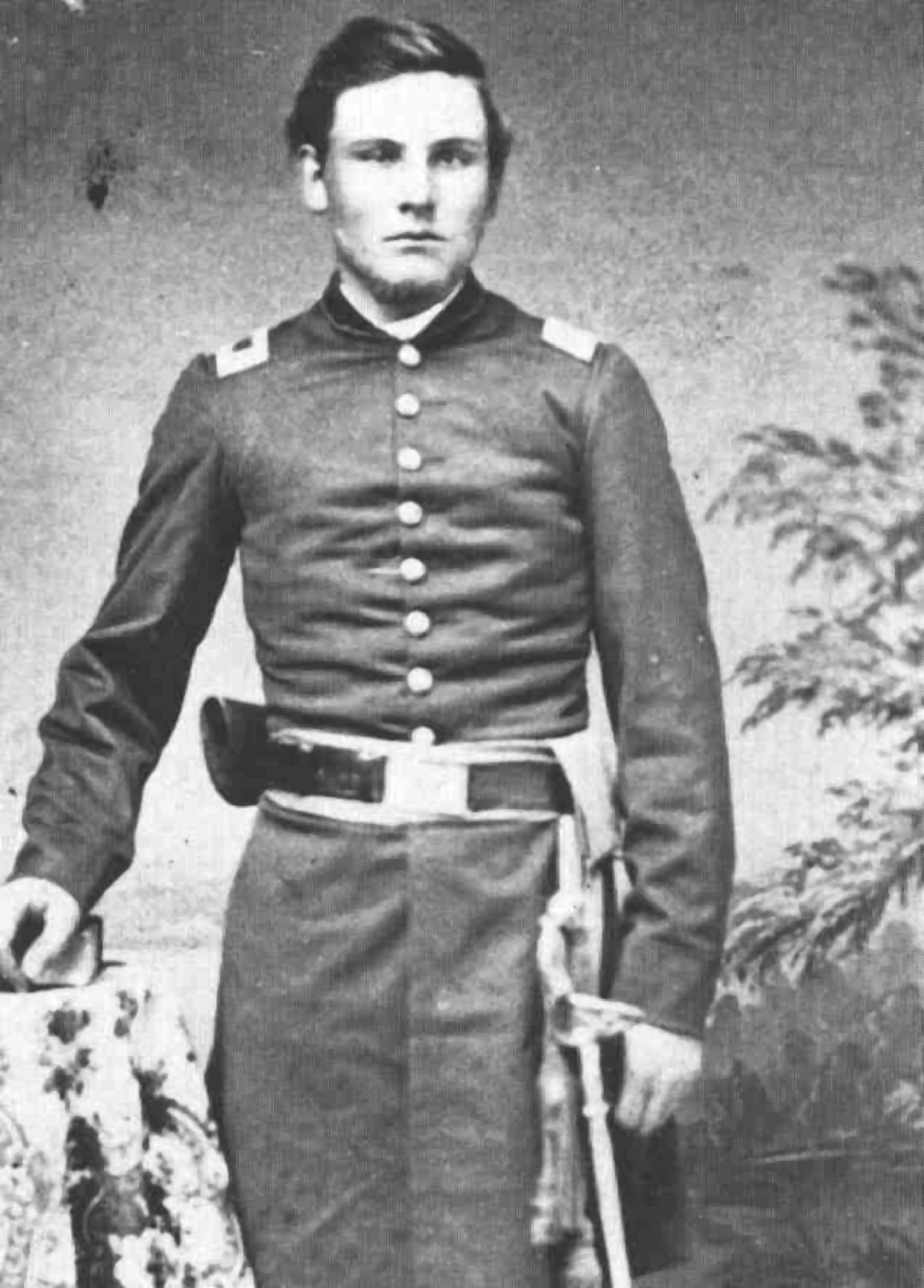
- Hastings in c. 1865
- Born: December 27, 1843; Quincy, Michigan
- Died: October 13, 1905 (aged 61)
- Burial place: Denver, Colorado
- Military career
- Allegiance: United States
- Branch: United States Army; Union Army
- Rank: Colonel
- Units: Company M, 5th Michigan Volunteer Cavalry Regiment
- Conflicts: American Civil War
- Awards: Medal of Honor

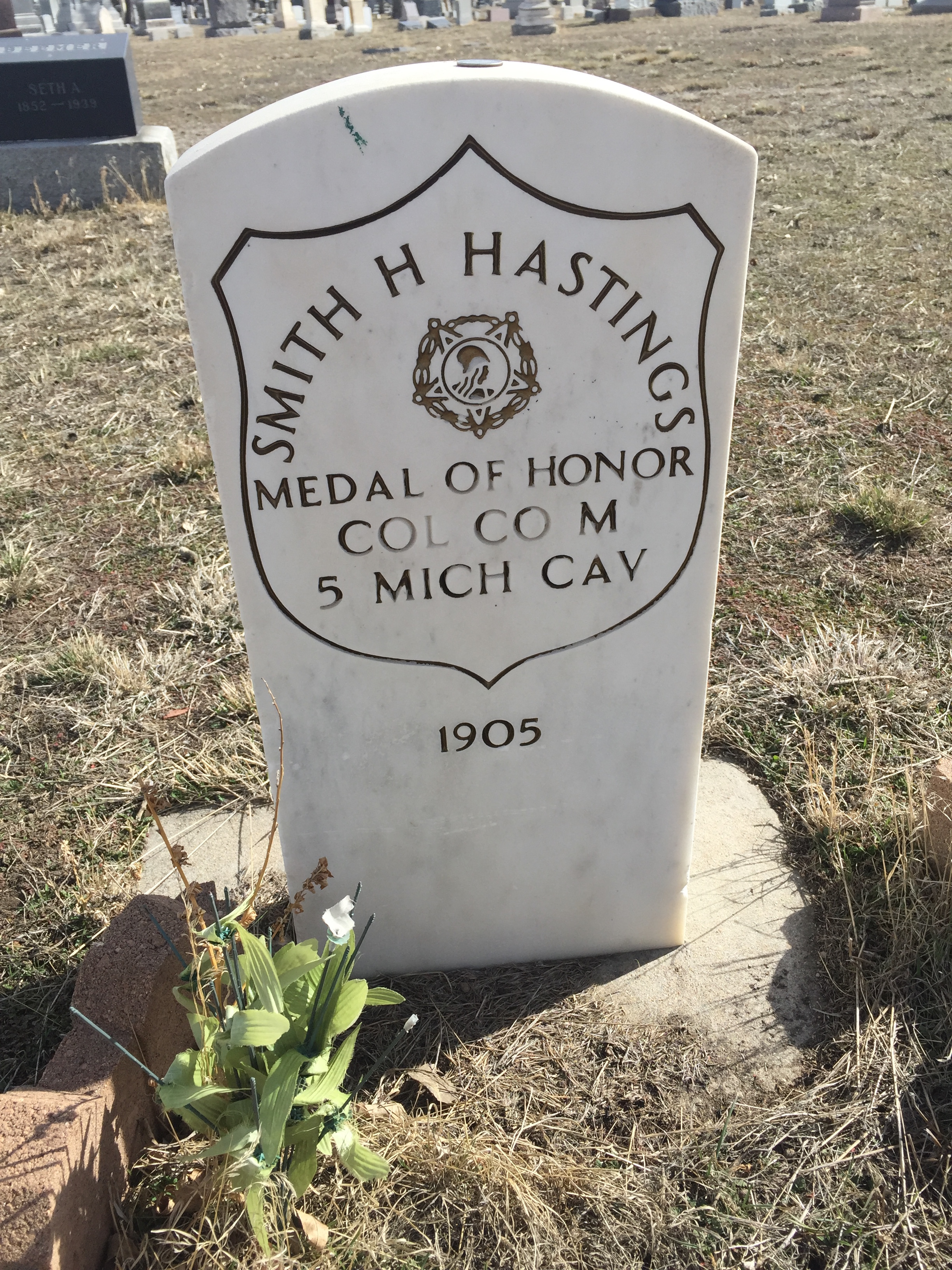
Hastings' burial marker in Riverside Cemetery, Colorado

Smith Hugh Hastings (December 27, 1843 - October 13, 1905) was a Union Army soldier in the American Civil War who received the U.S. military's highest decoration, the Medal of Honor.

Hastings was born in Quincy, Michigan, on December 27, 1843. He was awarded the Medal of Honor, for extraordinary heroism on July 24, 1863, while serving as a captain with Company M, 5th Michigan Volunteer Cavalry Regiment, at Newbys Crossroads, Virginia. His Medal of Honor was issued on August 2, 1897.

Colonel Hastings was a companion of the Colorado Commandery of the Military Order of the Loyal Legion of the United States.

He died at the age of 61, on October 13, 1905, and was buried at the Riverside Cemetery in Denver, Colorado.

== Medal of Honor citation ==
The President of the United States of America, in the name of Congress, takes pleasure in presenting the Medal of Honor to Captain Smith H. Hastings, United States Army, for extraordinary heroism on 24 July 1863, while serving with Troop M, 5th Michigan Cavalry, in action at Newbys Crossroads, Virginia. While in command of a squadron in rear guard of a cavalry division, then retiring before the advance of a corps of infantry, Captain Hastings was attacked by the enemy and, orders having been given to abandon the guns of a section of field artillery with the rear guard that were in imminent danger of capture, he disregarded the orders received and aided in repelling the attack and saving the guns.

== See also ==
- Jackson's Valley Campaign
- Second Battle of Deep Bottom
- Siege of Petersburg
