= George Francis McGinnis =

American politician

George F. McGinnis
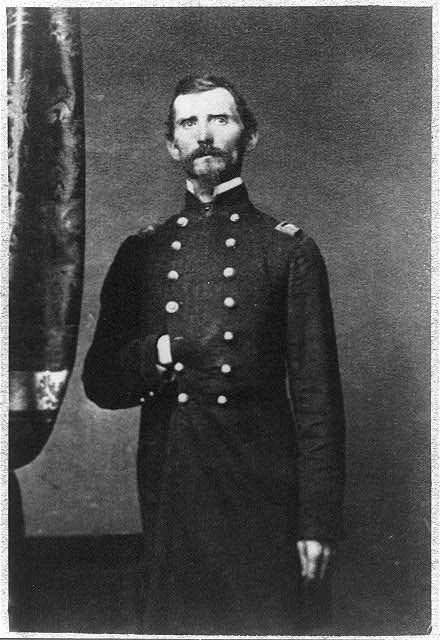
- George Francis McGinnis
- Born: 19 March 1826; Boston, Massachusetts, US
- Died: 29 May 1910 (aged 84); Indianapolis, Indiana, US
- Burial place: Crown Hill Cemetery and Arboretum, Section 16, Lot 23; 39.8177397°N 86.1747256°W
- Military career
- Allegiance: United States of America; Union
- Branch: United States Army; Union Army
- Service years: 1846–1848, 1861–1865
- Rank: Brigadier general, United States Volunteers
- Commands: 11th Indiana Volunteer Infantry Regiment
- Conflicts: Mexican–American War; American Civil War; Battle of Rich Mountain; Battle of Fort Donelson; Battle of Shiloh; Siege of Corinth; Battle of Champion Hill; Siege of Vicksburg
- Other work: Hatter, Postmaster of Indianapolis

George Francis McGinnis (19 March 1826 – 29 May 1910) was a volunteer soldier during the Mexican–American War and a Union General during the American Civil War.

== Early life ==
McGinnis was born in Boston, Massachusetts. His mother died when he was an infant and he lived with his aunt for a time. At age 11 he and his father moved to Ohio where his father became a hatter. It was during his time in Ohio that war with Mexico broke out and George volunteered his services. Commissioned as a lieutenant in the 2nd Ohio Volunteer Infantry, he was mustered out of the volunteers with the rank of captain in 1848; and returned to Ohio to take up hatting.

== Civil War ==
=== Western Virginia ===
Immediately after the Civil War began, McGinnis volunteered for service in the 11th Indiana Volunteer Infantry Regiment being raised by Col. Lew Wallace for 3-month service. Within a month he rose from private to captain and then, on 25 April, lieutenant colonel. McGinnis and the 11th Indiana took part in Wallace's raid on Romney, West Virginia, on 13 June 1861.

=== Fort Donelson and Shiloh ===
The 3-month enlistment ran out, but the regiment was re-mustered, and on 31 August 1861, McGinnis was again made lieutenant colonel with Wallace as colonel. Due to the style of training, the regiment became known as "Wallace's Zouaves". On 3 September, Wallace was promoted to brigadier general and McGinnis became colonel of the regiment. McGinnis led the regiment during the capture of Fort Henry and then overland toward Fort Donelson. During the Battle of Fort Donelson, his regiment was temporarily attached to Lew Wallace's division and fought in the counterattack on the Union right. He received the praise of Lew Wallace for his actions that battle. McGinnis also led his regiment in the following battles of Shiloh and Corinth.

=== Vicksburg ===
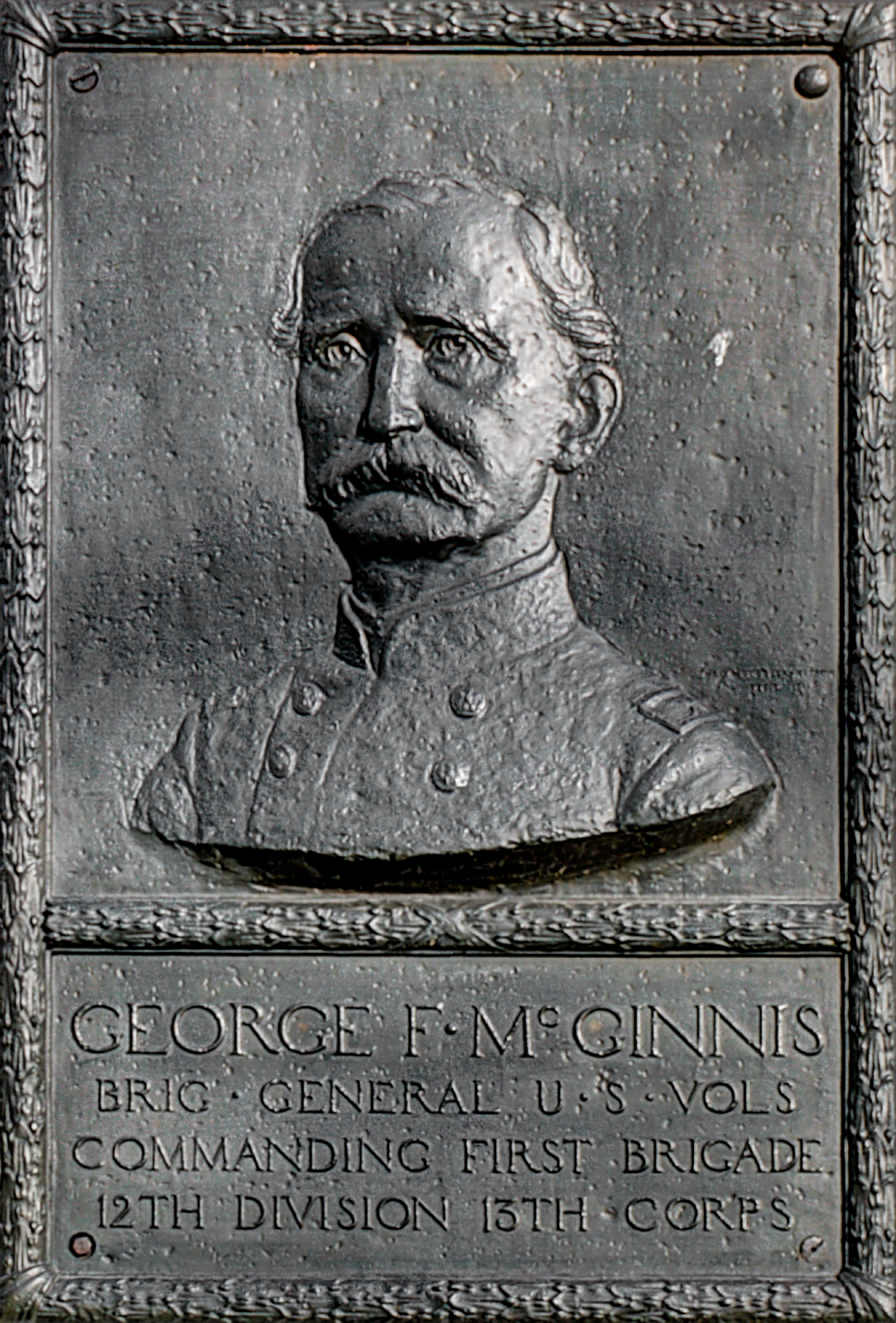
Bronze relief portrait of McGinnis by T.A.R. Kitson at Vicksburg National Military Park

On 4 April 1863, McGinnis was promoted to brigadier general of volunteers, to rank from 29 November 1862. He was in command of a brigade in the District of Eastern Arkansas. After a time of garrison duty, McGinnis was appointed to command the 1st Brigade in Alvin P. Hovey's 12th Division of the XIII Corps, commanded by John A. McClernand. McGinnis's brigade was heavily engaged in the Battle of Champion Hill and fought with distinction. During the siege of Vicksburg, his troops occupied a length of siege lines in the center of the Union army near Fort Garrott. A bronze plaque of McGinnis is located near this spot.

After the fall of Vicksburg, McGinnis fell upon a series of insignificant commands. This was possibly due to his connection with McClernand and Wallace, both of whom had become unpopular with Ulysses S. Grant and the regular army officers of the Army of the Tennessee. More significantly, McGinnis belonged to the XIII Corps, which was assigned to the Department of the Gulf. The Department of the Gulf had become relatively quiet after the fall of Vicksburg and Port Hudson. McGinnis rose to command of the 3rd Division and held that command during most of 1864. During the winter of 1864–1865 he was transferred to command the "Forces on the White River" in the Department of Arkansas. This was essentially a brigade-sized command guarding the mouth of the White River.

== Later life ==
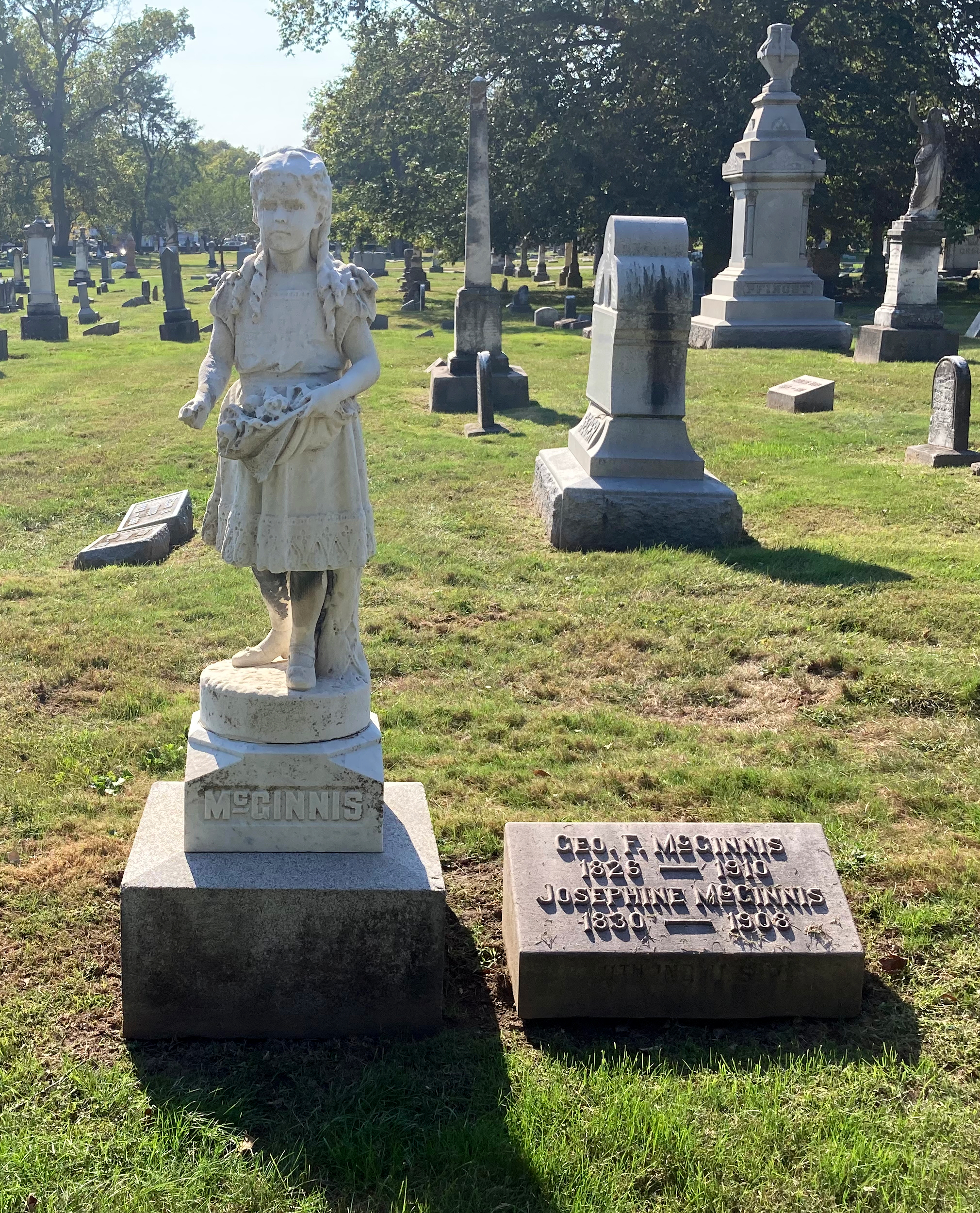
McGinnis's grave at Crown Hill Cemetery

McGinnis was mustered out of the volunteer services on 24 August 1865. He moved to Indianapolis and ran a fiduciary business and served in various local political positions. From 1867 to 1871 he served as the Marion County auditor and then from 1900 was appointed postmaster of Indianapolis. He died on 29 May 1910, in Indianapolis, and is buried in that city's Crown Hill Cemetery in Section 16, Lot 23, 39.8177397°N 86.1747256°W.

== See also ==
- List of American Civil War generals (Union)
