= 19th New York Cavalry Regiment =

- New York flag
- Active: August 11, 1863, to September 10, 1863
- Country: United States
- Allegiance: Union
- Branch: Cavalry

The 19th New York Cavalry Regiment was a cavalry regiment that served in the Union Army during the American Civil War.

== Service ==
Originally mustered into service as the 130th New York Volunteer Infantry Regiment it was converted to cavalry on July 28, 1863, and designated as the 19th Regiment New York Volunteer Cavalry. The men were recruited from Allegany, Livingston, and Wyoming counties. The 19th Cavalry was officially re-designated as the 1st Regiment New York Dragoons on September 10, 1863. The regiment was commanded by Col. Alfred Gibbs.

== See also ==
- List of New York Civil War regiments
