= William W. Winegar =

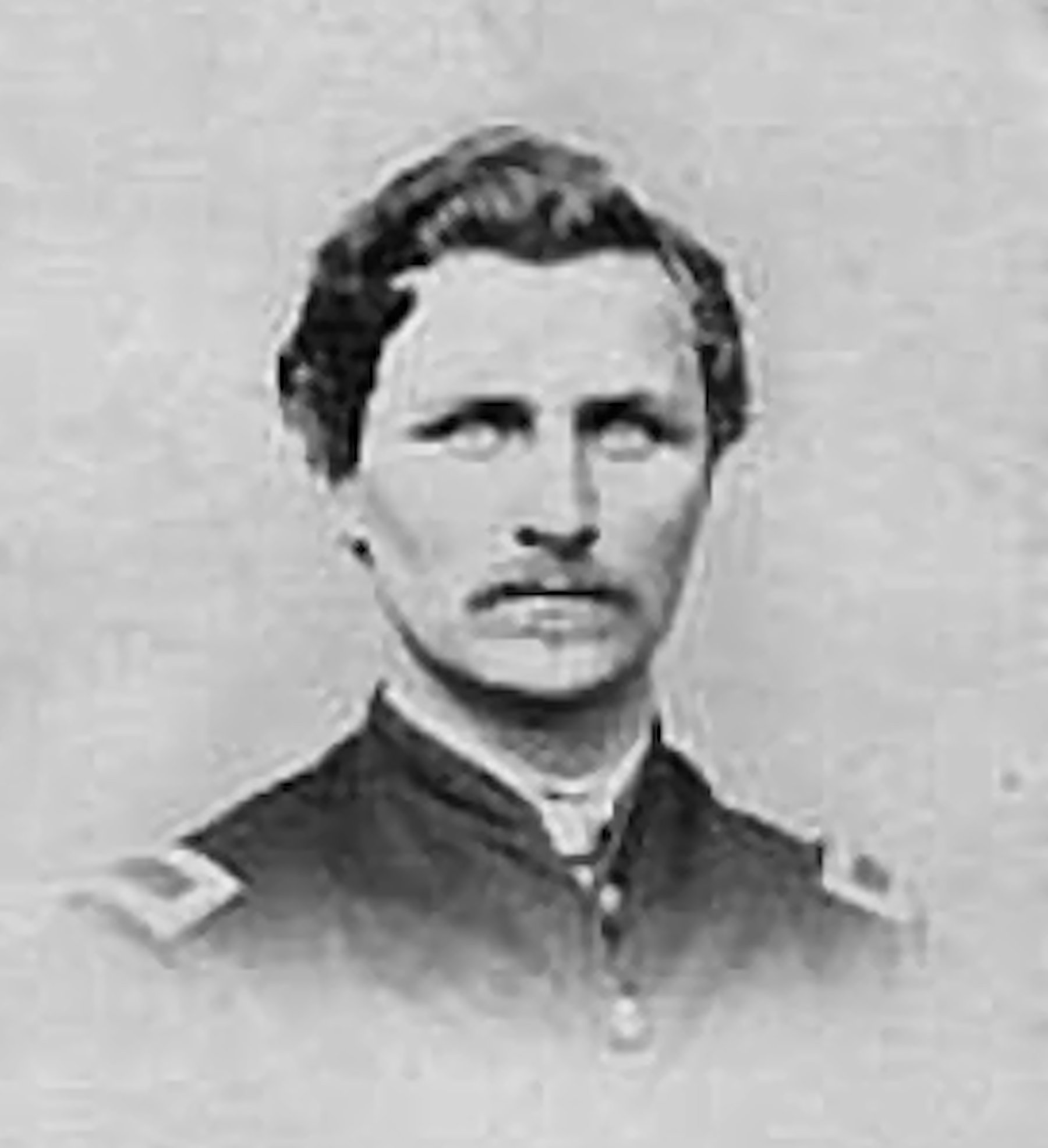
- Born: October 20, 1844; Springport, New York
- Died: September 3, 1916 (aged 71); New York
- Burial place: Nondaga Cemetery, Bath, New York
- Military career
- Allegiance: United States
- Branch: United States Army; Union Army
- Service years: 1862 - 1865
- Rank: First Lieutenant; Brevet Captain
- Unit: (New York (state)) 1st Regiment New York Dragoons
- Conflicts: American Civil War • Battle of Five Forks
- Awards: Medal of Honor

William Wirt Winegar (1844 – 1916) was a Union Army officer during the American Civil War. He received the Medal of Honor for gallantry during the Battle of Five Forks fought on April 1, 1865 southwest of Petersburg, Virginia. The battle was part of the Appomattox Campaign and was a victory for Union forces under Maj. Gen. Philip H. Sheridan over Confederate Maj. Gen. George E. Pickett.

Winegar enlisted in the Army from Mount Morris, New York in August 1862. He was commissioned as an officer in November 1864, and mustered out with his regiment in June 1865.

== Medal of Honor citation ==
"The President of the United States of America, in the name of Congress, takes pleasure in presenting the Medal of Honor to First Lieutenant (Cavalry) William W. Winegar, United States Army, for extraordinary heroism on 1 April 1865, while serving with Company B, 19th New York Cavalry (1st New York Dragoons), in action at Five Forks, Virginia. While advancing in front of his company and alone, First Lieutenant Winegar found himself surrounded by the enemy. He accosted a nearby enemy flag-bearer demanding the surrender of the group. His effective firing of one shot so demoralized the unit that it surrendered with flag." The Medal was awarded on May 3, 1865.

== See also ==
- List of Medal of Honor recipients
- List of American Civil War Medal of Honor recipients: T-Z
