= Edward Merwin Lee =

American lawyer

Edward Merwin Lee (23 August 1835 – 1 January 1913) was an attorney from Guilford, Connecticut, who went on to serve under General Custer during the American Civil War. While starting as a frontier attorney he quickly advanced to become Lieutenant Colonel of the 5th Michigan Cavalry Regiment, serving in Custer's Michigan Brigade (otherwise known as the "Wolverines"). He received his appointment as brevet brigadier general dated to March 13, 1865. He is also known as an early supporter for women's suffrage. In Wyoming, he signed the first bill giving women the ballot. He is sometimes called Edward M. Lee in print.

== Life ==
In 1867, as a member of the Connecticut legislature, Lee introduced a women's suffrage amendment. After the war, Ulysses S. Grant appointed John Allen Campbell as the first governor of Wyoming and Edward M. Lee as the state's first secretary, the second-highest ranking territorial officer. The suffrage bill that Lee helped introduce also granted married women control of their separate property, permitted married women to work in trade or businesses and control their own earnings, stated that a mortgage was not binding to a wife unless she freely and voluntarily signed it, and granted equal pay for equally qualified women teachers. Regarding Wyoming becoming the first territory or state to enshrine in law that women should be given the right to vote, Lee wrote: "Once, during the session, amid the greatest hilarity, and after the presentation of various funny amendments and in the full expectation of a gubernatorial veto, an act was passed Enfranchising the Women of Wyoming. The bill, however, was approved, became a law, and the youngest territory placed in the van of progress... How strange that a movement destined to purify the muddy pool of politics... should have originated in a joke... All honor to them, say we, to Wyoming's first legislature!" Susan B. Anthony proclaimed, "Wyoming is the first place on God's green earth which could consistently claim to be the land of the Free!" Edward M. Lee had championed this cause for years, arguing that it was unfair for his mother to be denied a privilege now granted to African-American males.

He died of paralysis at the private sanitarium on 124 West 136th St., Manhattan, on January 1, 1913.

== See also ==
- List of American Civil War brevet generals (Union)
