= 85th New York Infantry Regiment =

- Active: August 1861 - June 27, 1865
- Country: United States
- Allegiance: Union
- Branch: Infantry
- Engagements: Siege of Yorktown; Battle of Williamsburg; Battle of Seven Pines; Seven Days Battles; Battle of Garnett's & Golding's Farm; Battle of White Oak Swamp; Battle of Malvern Hill; Battle of Plymouth; Battle of Wyse Fork

The 85th New York Infantry Regiment was an infantry regiment in the Union Army during the American Civil War.

== Service ==
The 85th New York Infantry was organized at Elmira, New York beginning in August 1861 and mustered in for three-years service on December 2, 1861 under the command of Colonel Uriah L. Davis.

The regiment was attached to 3rd Brigade, Casey's Division, Army of the Potomac, to March 1862. 3rd Brigade, 3rd Division, IV Corps, Army of the Potomac, to June 1862. 2nd Brigade, 2nd Division, IV Corps, to September 1862. Wessell's Brigade, Division at Suffolk, VII Corps, Department of Virginia, to December 1862. 1st Brigade, 1st Division, Department of North Carolina, to January 1863. 1st Brigade, 4th Division, XVIII Corps, Department of North Carolina, to May 1863. District of the Albemarle, Department of North Carolina, August 1863. Sub-District of the Albemarle, District of North Carolina, Department of Virginia and North Carolina, to April 1864. Plymouth, North Carolina, District of North Carolina, January to March 1865. 2nd Brigade, Division District of Beaufort, North Carolina, Department of North Carolina, to April 1865. Unattached, XXIII Corps, Department of North Carolina, to June 1865.

The 85th New York Infantry mustered out of service on June 27, 1865.

== Detailed service ==
Left New York for Washington, D.C., December 3, 1861.

Duty in the defenses of Washington, D.C., until March 1862. Advance on Manassas, Va., March 10–15. Moved to the Peninsula, Va., March 28. Siege of Yorktown April 5-May 4. Reconnaissance toward Lee's Mills April 29. Battle of Williamsburg May 5. Reconnaissance to Bottom's Bridge May 20–23. Seven Pines, Savage Station and Chickahominy May 24. Reconnaissance to Seven Pines May 24–27. Battle of Seven Pines May 31-June 1. New Market Road June 8. Seven days before Richmond June 25-July 1. Bottom's Bridge June 27–28. White Oak Swamp June 30. Malvern Hill July 1. At Harrison's Landing until August 16. Moved to Fort Monroe August 16–23, then to Suffolk, Va., September 18, and duty there until December. Reconnaissance to Franklin October 3. Blackwater October 9, 26, 29 and 30. Franklin October 31. Zuni November 18. Ordered to New Bern, N.C., December 4. Foster's Expedition to Goldsboro, N.C., December 11–20. Actions at Kinston December 14. Whitehall December 16. Goldsboro December 17.

Duty at New Bern, N.C., until April 1863. Expedition to relief of Little Washington April 7–10. Moved to Plymouth, N.C., May 2, and duty there until July. Expedition to Williamston and Gardiner's Bridge July 5–7 (detachment). Expedition from Plymouth to Foster's Mills July 26–29. Expedition to Roanoke Island August 6–13, and to Columbia August 26–27. Duty at Albemarle Sound and Chowan River until November. Expedition to Winton November 6–9.

Regiment veteranized January 1, 1864. Expedition up the Chowan January 6–21. Harrellsville January 20 (detachment). Siege of Plymouth, N.C., April 17–20. Surrendered at Plymouth April 20.

Regiment reorganized January 1865, and duty in the Department of North Carolina until June. Carolinas Campaign March 1-April 26. Advance on Kinston and Goldsboro March 6–21. Battle of Wyse Fork March 8–10. Occupation of Kinston March 14, and of Goldsboro March 21. Occupation of Raleigh April 14. Bennett's House April 26. Surrender of Johnston and his army. Duty in the Department of North Carolina until June.

== Casualties ==
The regiment lost a total of 361 men during service; 1 officers and 34 enlisted men killed or mortally wounded, 2 officers and 324 enlisted men died of disease.

== Commanders ==
- Colonel Uriah L. Davis
- Colonel Robert B. Van Valkenburgh
- Colonel Jonathan S. Belknap
- Colonel Enrico Fardella
- Colonel William W. Clark

== Notable members ==
- John Raines
- Ellicott R. Stillman
- Thomas Jones Thorp

== See also ==
- List of New York Civil War regiments
- New York in the Civil War
