= Peter J. Ryan =

American Civil War Medal of Honor recipient

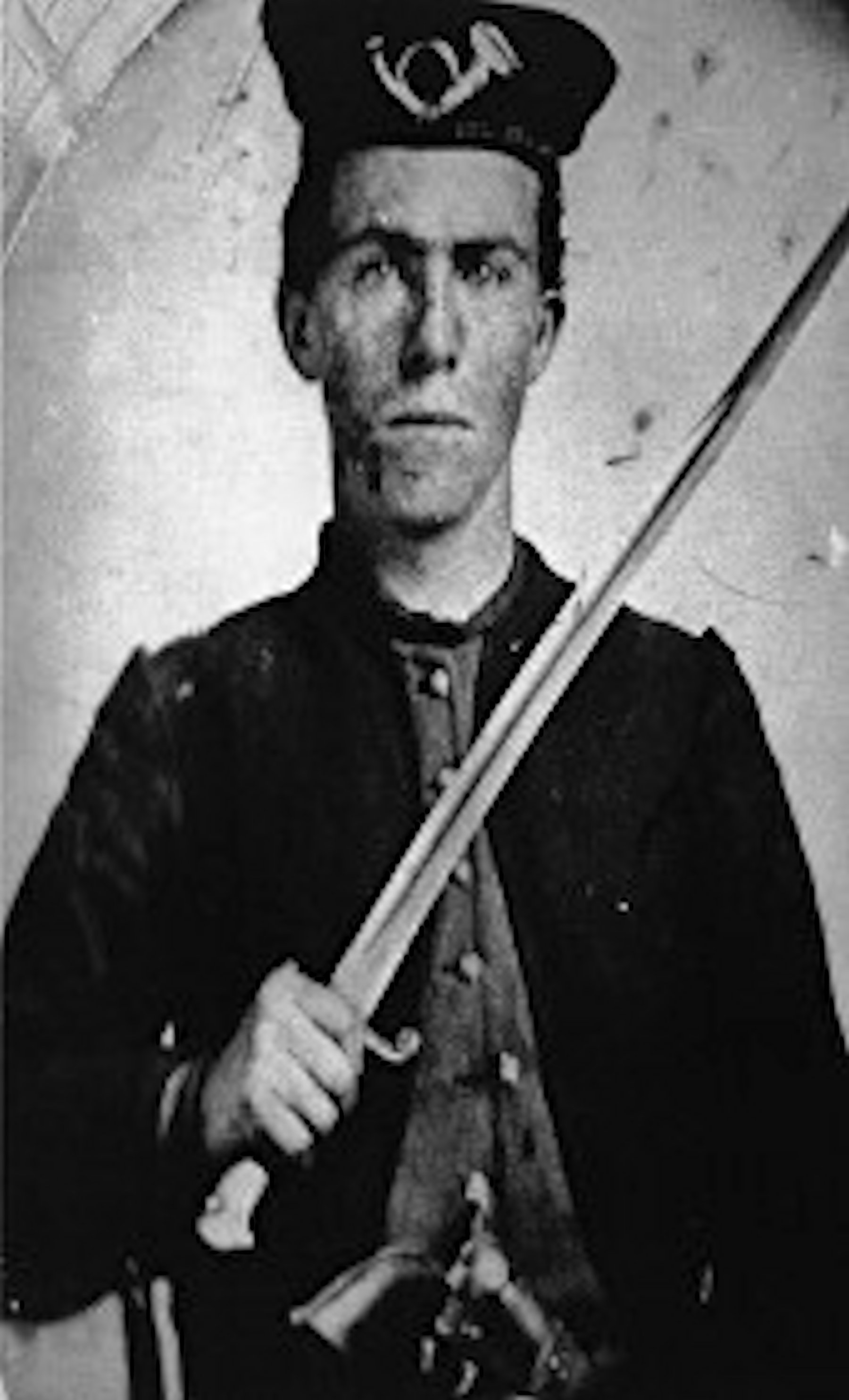
- Ryan c. 1865
- Born: 1841; County Tipperary, Ireland
- Died: January 8, 1908; Indiana
- Burial place: Calvary Cemetery, Terre Haute, Indiana
- Military career
- Allegiance: United States
- Branch: United States Army; Union Army
- Service years: 1861 - 1865
- Rank: Private
- Unit: 11th Indiana Infantry
- Conflicts: American Civil War • Battle of Opequon
- Awards: Medal of Honor

Peter J. Ryan (1841 – January 8, 1908) was a Union Army soldier during the American Civil War. He received the Medal of Honor for gallantry during the Battle of Opequon more commonly called the Third Battle of Winchester, Virginia on September 19, 1864.

Ryan joined the army from Indiana in July 1861, and was mustered out in July 1865.

== Medal of Honor citation ==
"The President of the United States of America, in the name of Congress, takes pleasure in presenting the Medal of Honor to Private Peter J. Ryan, United States Army, for extraordinary heroism on 19 September 1864, while serving with Company D, 11th Indiana Infantry, in action at Winchester, Virginia. With one companion, Private Ryan captured 14 Confederates in the severest part of the battle."

Pvt. Ryan was one of three soldiers of the 11th Indiana Infantry to receive the Medal of Honor for this action. The others were Sgt. Charles H. Seston and Pvt. John T. Sterling.

== See also ==
- List of Medal of Honor recipients
- List of American Civil War Medal of Honor recipients: Q–S
