= Ellicott R. Stillman =

American politician and businessman (1844–1911)

Ellicott Roger Stillman (March 6, 1844 – February 13, 1911) was an American politician and businessman.

Born in Rochester, New York, Stillman served in the 85th New York Volunteer Infantry during the American Civil War. In 1886, Stillman moved to Michigan and, then, in 1887, settled in Milwaukee, Wisconsin. He was involved with the manufacturing of lumber and cooperage. In 1895, Stillman served in the Wisconsin State Assembly and was a Republican. He served as postmaster of Milwaukee. In 1910, Stillman moved to Waukesha, Wisconsin and was involved with the mineral water business. He died at his home in Waukesha, Wisconsin after suffering a stroke.
