= 130th New York Infantry Regiment =

- New York flag
- Active: September 2, 1862, to July 28, 1863
- Country: United States
- Allegiance: Union
- Branch: Infantry
- Engagements: American Civil War: Battle of Deserted House; Siege of Suffolk

Commanders
- Notable commanders: Colonel Alfred Gibbs

The 130th New York Infantry Regiment was an infantry regiment that served in the Union Army during the American Civil War.

== Service ==
The 130th New York Volunteer Infantry was mustered into service at Portage, New York, by Lt. Col. Thomas Jones Thorp in September 1862. Consisting of ten companies, the men were recruited from Allegany, Livingston, and Wyoming counties and placed under the command of Col. Alfred Gibbs.

The regiment left New York on August 6, 1862, and arrived in Suffolk, Virginia, on August 13 where it was assigned to the 1st Division, VII Corps of the Army of the Potomac. The 1st Division was commanded by Gen. Michael Corcoran. The 130th New York was engaged at the Battle of Deserted House and took part in the Siege of Suffolk in April and May 1863.

The regiment was converted to cavalry on July 28, 1863, and designated as the 19th Regiment New York Volunteer Cavalry. The 19th Cavalry was officially re-designated as the 1st Regiment New York Dragoons on September 10, 1863. The 130th New York had the distinction of being the only Union army volunteer regiment which was converted entirely from infantry to cavalry during the Civil War.

== See also ==
- 1st Regiment New York Dragoons
- List of New York Civil War regiments
