= Crystal Lake Cemetery =

Historic cemetery in Corvallis, Oregon, U.S.

- U.S. National Register of Historic Places
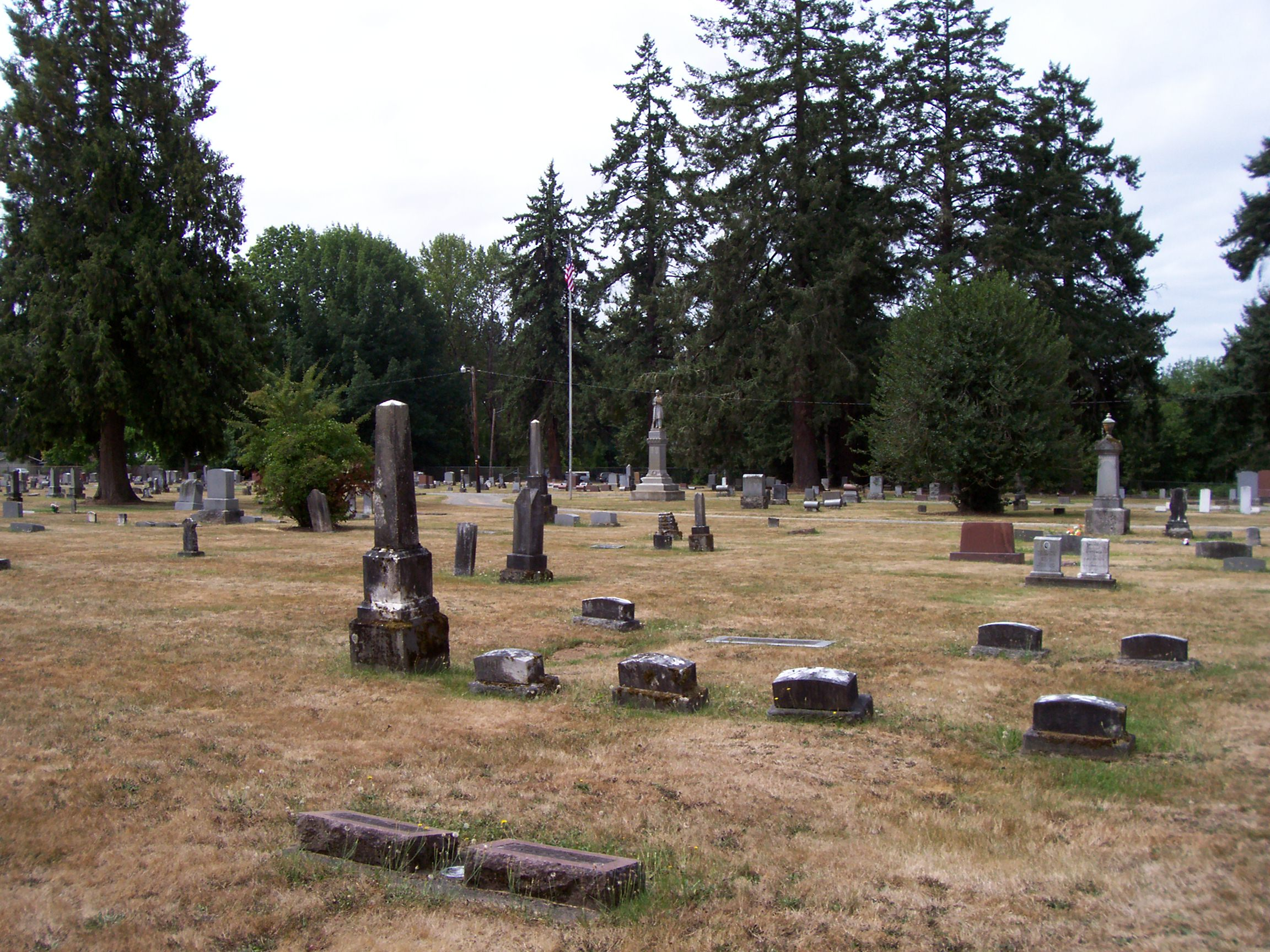
- Crystal Lake Cemetery

- Location within Oregon Location within the United States
- Nearest city: Corvallis, Oregon
- Coordinates: 44°32′52″N 123°15′12″W
- Area: 13.6 acres (5.5 ha)
- Built: 1850
- NRHP reference No.: 04000613
- Added to NRHP: June 16, 2004

Crystal Lake Cemetery, located in Corvallis, Benton County, Oregon, United States, is listed on the National Register of Historic Places in June 2004. It is a burial ground that provides Corvallis residents with funeral and burial services. Although the tombs found at Crystal Lake Cemetery are not the oldest ones in Benton County, it is said that Crystal Lake Cemetery is one of the oldest cemetery in continuous use. Memorial Day services have been offered by it for about 60 years. The Corvallis American Legion Post 11 and the Corvallis Veterans of Foreign Wars Post 640 now sponsored the activity near the Civil War monument.

== History ==
The predecessor of Corvallis, Marysville, was a brand new town when Joseph Alexander buried his first wife Sarah on their Donation Land Claim in 1850. Designed by Joseph Avery, Marysville is a small town on the Oregon-California trail. In 1851, Joseph Avery renamed this town Corvallis to avoid confusion with another town, Marysville, California. In 1860, Joseph Alexander and his second wife designated the cemetery to Corvallis Masonic Lodge NO. 14. Before the Willamette River was inundated by dams, a small lake was formed by a meandering stream on the east side of the cemetery, which probably be the origin of the name of Crystal Lake Cemetery. It was officially adopted by Lodge on January 20, 1866. The operation and management of the cemetery was handed over to Benton County in 2001.

Crystal Lake Cemetery witnesses the evolution of cemeteries in the United States. Around 1831, a revolution began throughout the country, from churchyard cemetery to "rural" or "garden" cemetery. Built outside of towns in park-like settings, these cemeteries became places where people could stroll and enjoy nature, as well as visiting the graves of their friends and relatives. Since 1855, the park movement has inspired the "lawn" cemetery. People imagined an open green lawn as an ideal cemetery. Now, instead of walking down the path to the cemetery, visitors walk through a green lawn. The road is more straight and the tomb is divided into blocks. The newest section of Crystal Lake Cemetery influenced by the memorial park movement began in 1920s. This movement had many characteristics of lawn cemeteries, but required imbedded markers instead of traditional upright headstones. Promoters claimed that this type of cemetery would be easier to maintain.

== Burials ==
- Green Berry Smith, prominent landowner & early Pioneer
- Mary Scott, first businesswoman of Corvallis & early pioneer
- Benjamin Lee Arnold, OSU President (1872–1892)
- John Burnett, State Senator & Judge
- Lewis Southworth & Maria Southworth, African-American pioneers
- Edward Allworth, OSU Class of 1916 & WWI Medal of Honor Recipient
- Eliza Gorman, African-American pioneer
- Joseph Conant Avery, founder of Corvallis
- Helen Margaret Gilkey, OSU faculty member & honored botanist
- Andrew Jackson Thayer, US Congressman

== See also ==
- National Register of Historic Places listings in Benton County, Oregon
