= Edward Wallace =

Edward Test Wallace was a veteran of the Mexican–American War. He was also a participant in the Union Army during the American Civil War (1861–1865). Before the war he lived for a time in Mattoon, Illinois where he worked as a tinner at a hardware store. At the outset of the civil war, Wallace was captain in the 11th Indiana Infantry Regiment. Later, he was acting aid for his brother, General Lew Wallace at the Battle of Shiloh and later as Volunteer Aide-de-Camp for his brother at the defense of Cincinnati, Ohio. At the end of the war he was a captain in the Veteran Reserve Corps.

Wallace died in Brownwood, Texas in December 1885. His death from pneumonia came at the age of 58. Edward had been a resident of Brownwood for eleven years. Later in life he was an alcoholic. He was initially buried at Round Mountain Cemetery.

Colonel Wallace was a brother of General Lew Wallace and a son of Governor David Wallace of Indiana.
