= Alfred Gibbs =

Union Army general (1823–1868)

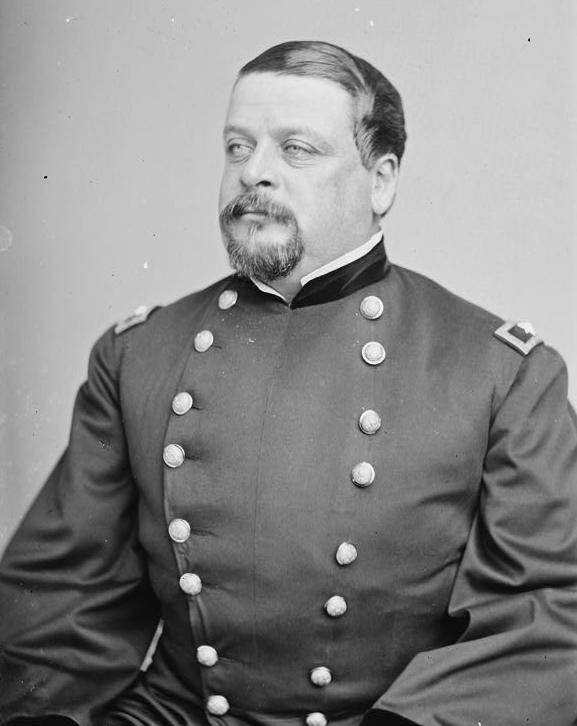
- Born: April 22, 1823; Astoria, Queens, New York, US
- Died: December 26, 1868 (aged 45); Fort Leavenworth, Kansas, US
- Burial place: Saint Mary's Episcopal Churchyard, Portsmouth, Rhode Island, US
- Military career
- Allegiance: United States; Union
- Branch: United States Army; Union Army
- Service years: 1846–1868
- Rank: Brevet Major General
- Commands: 130th New York Volunteer Infantry; 1st New York Dragoons
- Conflicts: Mexican–American War; Apache Wars; American Civil War

Alfred Gibbs (April 22, 1823 – December 26, 1868) was a career officer in the United States Army (Regular Army) who served as an officer during the Mexican-American War and Apache Wars. He served as a brigadier general in the Union Army during the American Civil War.

== Career summary ==
Gibbs graduated from the United States Military Academy in the class of 1846, served and was twice wounded in the Mexican–American War and was wounded again by Apaches during frontier service in 1857. His pre-Civil War career was in cavalry service. During the Civil War, Gibbs commanded the only Union army volunteer regiment which was converted from an infantry regiment entirely to a cavalry regiment: The 130th New York Infantry converted to the 1st Regiment New York Dragoons.

After the conversion of Gibbs's regiment to cavalry service in August 1863, he was frequently assigned to command a cavalry brigade and briefly to command a cavalry division. He only was appointed to brigadier general of volunteers to rank from the date of the Battle of Cedar Creek on October 19, 1864, and given permanent brigade command in December 1864. He received three brevet general awards for meritorious service in three key battles, Trevilian Station, Opequon or Third Winchester and Five Forks.

As commander of an infantry regiment, Gibbs participated in the successful defense of Suffolk, Virginia and Norfolk, Virginia, in April and early May, 1863 when Confederate forces under Lt. Gen. James Longstreet tried to retake those key locations. He led his brigade or his regiment in major battles of the Overland Campaign and Maj. Gen. Sheridan's raid which led to the Battle of Yellow Tavern. His brigade and division were detached from the Army of the Potomac soon after the beginning of the Siege of Petersburg to serve with Sheridan in all the battles of the Shenandoah Valley Campaigns of 1864. He and his brigade returned to Petersburg with Sheridan on March 26, 1865, and played a large part in the key battles of Dinwiddie Court House and Five Forks, which led to the breaking of the Confederate lines and the flight of the Confederate Army of Northern Virginia under the command of General Robert E. Lee from Petersburg and Richmond, Virginia.

His brigade and division, under the command of Brig. Gen. Thomas C. Devin and the overall command of Maj. Gen. Sheridan joined in the pursuit of the Army of Northern Virginia in the ensuing Appomattox Campaign, and were engaged especially at the key Battle of Sayler's Creek (sometimes shown as "Sailor's Creek"). Gibbs was present at the surrender of the Army of Northern Virginia at Appomattox Court House on April 9, 1865.

Gibbs remained in the Regular Army as a major in the 7th U.S. Cavalry after the war. He served as Post Commander of Fort Harker, Kansas, on four different occasions from January 1867 to December 1868. He died of congestion of the brain (typically what is now called a stroke) on December 26, 1868, aged 45.

== Early life ==
Gibbs was born on his father's estate, now within Astoria, Long Island, New York. He was the son of mineralogist Colonel George Gibbs and grandson of Oliver Wolcott Jr., Secretary of the Treasury in the administrations of Presidents George Washington and John Adams His older brothers were George Gibbs and Oliver Wolcott Gibbs.

Gibbs attended school in White Plains, New York and Dartmouth College before he was appointed to the United States Military Academy at West Point, New York. He graduated from West Point forty-second of fifty-nine in the class of 1846. Only one reference cited below was found to mention Gibbs marrying or having children. A Gibbs genealogy privately published in 1933 shows Gibbs was married and had two sons. He married Peggy Forshee Blair of Richmond, Virginia December 27, 1855. They had two sons: Alfred Wolcott Gibbs (1856–1922), a railway mechanical engineer and Dr. John Blair Gibbs (1858–1898), an assistant surgeon, U.S. Navy.

== Mexican–American War, Apache Wars, & frontier service ==
After Gibbs graduated from the U. S. Military Academy in 1846, he was assigned to the Regiment of Mounted Rifles and served in the Mexican–American War in which he was wounded. He was awarded the ranks of brevet first lieutenant and brevet captain for gallantry. In 1847 he served with the Army of Occupation in Mexico City and became an original member of the Aztec Club of 1847.

After the war ended, he served as aide-de-camp to Brigadier General Persifor F. Smith until 1856. In 1850, Gibbs partnered with Joseph Hooker in a profiteering scheme to purchase hay at market prices then sell the hay to the army for double the price. Hooker, who was the assistant adjutant general of the Pacific Division in Sonoma, California, was arrested in November 1851 and faced a court martial for conduct unbecoming an officer and a gentleman for his profiteering. Gibbs was not arrested. Instead, he received a personal reprimand at the Department of War in Washington, DC. He was a witness for both the prosecution and defense.

From 1856 through the beginning of the American Civil War, Gibbs was on frontier duty with his troop of Mounted Rifles. He was wounded in a skirmish with Apaches at Cooke's Spring, New Mexico, in March 1857.

== American Civil War ==
=== Mesilla, San Agustin Springs ===
At the start of the Civil War, Gibbs was first lieutenant of the Regiment of Mounted Rifles of the U.S. Army (Regular Army). Gibbs was taken prisoner after leading ten men (all that remained of his I Company R.M.R.)driving a herd of one hundred cattle from Fort Craig. Stopped to water the herd at San Agustin Springs, New Mexico He and his soldiers were included with the Union forces surrendered by Major Isaac Lynde (7th U.S. Infantry) to Confederate forces from Texas under the command of Lieutenant Colonel John R. Baylor during the retreat of United States Army forces loyal to the Union from Fort Fillmore, New Mexico. Gibbs was paroled but not exchanged until August 7, 1862. In the meantime, on August 3, 1861, he was promoted to captain of the 3rd United States Cavalry Regiment. Gibbs was in command at Fort Wayne in Detroit, Michigan, between December 1861 and August 1862 while serving his parole. Soon after his exchange, on September 6, 1862, Gibbs was commissioned as colonel of the 130th New York Volunteer Infantry Regiment. The regiment had been organized at Portage, New York, in August 1862.

=== Suffolk, Peninsula, Bristoe, Mine Run ===
Gibbs's regiment was sent from Portage to Suffolk, Virginia and arrived on September 13, 1862. Their position at Suffolk was located 18 miles southwest of Norfolk, Virginia, recently recaptured by Union forces, at the junction of two railroads. The location covered the land access to Norfolk and access to the seaboard by water. Gibbs joined the regiment soon after their arrival at Suffolk. The department was commanded by Maj. Gen. John A. Dix from Fort Monroe and the forces in the Suffolk area were commanded by Maj. Gen. John J. Peck.

After building fortifications, training and marching out from Suffolk on several expeditions, the regiment engaged in the Battle of Deserted House or Battle of Kelly's Store on January 30, 1863. General Michael Corcoran was in command of the force of about 8,000 men and three artillery batteries totaling 14 guns, with Colonel Gibbs in command of nine infantry regiments and Colonel Samuel P. Spear in command of the 11th Pennsylvania Cavalry. During a three-hour artillery duel, the 130th New York Infantry lost 7 men killed, 20 wounded and 2 missing. General Corcoran quarreled with Colonel Gibbs over the disposition of troops and placed him under arrest. Gibbs was soon proved correct, however, when Corcoran's own brigade broke and ran under heavy artillery fire. While Corcoran left the field to try to reorganize his brigade, three regiments decided to charge the Confederates on their own initiative. Though under arrest and without a horse or gun, Gibbs grabbed a flag and led the charge. The 130th New York Infantry was pushing the Confederates back through the adjacent woods when Corcoran reappeared and halted the advance. The battle ended with the Confederates under Brig. Gen. Roger Pryor driven from the field.

The Confederates under Lt. Gen. James Longstreet attempted to recapture Suffolk and Norfolk but after besieging the fortified Union forces from April 11, 1863, to May 3, 1863, the Confederates retired. Brig. Gen. Henry Dwight Terry now commanded the brigade and on April 17, 1863, he sent 6 companies of the 130th New York Infantry out to determine why the Confederates had ceased firing. When the Confederates resumed fire, the regiment lost one killed and five wounded. The Confederates broke off the siege on May 3, 1863. The brigade took part in Maj. Gen. Erasmus Keyes's abortive Peninsular Campaign toward Richmond between June 13, 1863, and July 12, 1863, while the Army of Northern Virginia was engaged in the Gettysburg campaign.

On August 11, 1863, this regiment was reorganized as a mounted troop named the 1st New York Dragoons, also known as and quite often referred to in reports and sources as the 19th New York Volunteer Cavalry Regiment. The regiment trained at Manassas and guarded the line of the Orange and Alexandria Railroad until November 1863. The regiment also participated in the Bristoe Campaign in September 1863 through November 1863. The Official Records of the Union Army show an order of battle for August 31, 1863, in which the 19th New York Volunteer Cavalry Regiment was assigned to the Headquarters of the Cavalry Corps of the Army of the Potomac, Maj. Gen. Alfred Pleasonton, commanding. Later the regiment was part of the Cavalry Reserve Brigade, Army of the Potomac ("Reserve Brigade") commanded by Brig. Gen. Wesley Merritt when it was not under Gibbs's command. The 19th New York Volunteer Cavalry Regiment, the 6th Pennsylvania Cavalry Regiment and the 1st, 2nd, 5th and 6th U.S. Cavalry Regiments comprised the brigade, which was occasionally called the "Regular Brigade."

On and after August 12, 1863, Gibbs was intermittently assigned to temporary brigade, and briefly to division, command in the cavalry corps of the Army of the Potomac and the Army of the Shenandoah through the rest of the war. Gibbs assumed command of the Reserve Brigade, guarding trains between August 12, 1863, and September 12, 1863, and, after Merritt was in command during the Bristoe Campaign, Gibbs resumed command of the brigade between November 21, 1863, and April 10, 1864. Bowen, one of Gibbs's men, states that Gibbs was in command of the brigade when the regiment became engaged at the Battle of Manassas Junction during the Bristoe Campaign on October 17, 1863. The regiment suffered 3 killed, 3 wounded, 1 captured and several injuries from falling horses. The brigade guarded a supply train during the Mine Run Campaign in December 1863. After much picket duty, scouting and guarding trains, the regiment went into winter quarters at Mitchell's Station, Virginia, on December 27, 1863.

=== Overland Campaign; Trevilian Station ===
As preparations began for the Overland Campaign, the Reserve Brigade became part of the 1st Division of the Cavalry Corps of the Army of the Potomac under the new corps commander, Maj. Gen. Philip Sheridan, who was appointed April 4, 1864. Command of the Reserve Brigade was transferred to Brig. Gen. Wesley Merritt from April 10, 1864, through the Battle of the Wilderness, May 5–6, 1864 and Gibbs resumed command of the 19th New York Cavalry (1st New York Dragoons). Then, on May 7, 1864, Merritt had to take command of the 1st Division of the Cavalry Corps to which the Reserve Brigade was assigned because its commander, Brig. Gen. Alfred T. A. Torbert needed an emergency operation to remove a painful abscess from his spine. Gibbs again assumed command of the Reserve Brigade, which saw much hard duty at the Battle of Todd's Tavern. At these battles, Merritt led the First Division of the Cavalry Corps and Gibbs was in command of the Reserve Brigade (which was the third brigade of three in the division).

As the Battle of the Wilderness wound down, the commander of the Army of Northern Virginia, General Robert E. Lee, anticipated Union Army General-in-Chief, Lt. Gen. Ulysses S. Grant's move to the south and west. Lee sent cavalry to block the roads in the direction of Spotsylvania Court House, Virginia, near Todd's Tavern, about a mile from the edge of the Wilderness battlefield. Todd's Tavern and the Brock Road, which had been abandoned on May 6, had to be retaken by Union forces on May 7. The fight at and near the tavern became the largest dismounted cavalry fight during the war. The 1st and 2nd brigades of the Army of the Potomac's 1st Cavalry Division drove the Confederate forces of Brig. Gen. John Gregg to the south across the Po River (Virginia) and the forces of Maj. Gen. Fitzhugh Lee back to Todd's Tavern. In the afternoon, Sheridan committed the Reserve Brigade, then under Gibbs, to the battle. Gibbs ordered the 6th Pennsylvania Cavalry to probe Fitzhugh Lee's line and to dismount and the other regiments to dismount and drive the Confederates back. By dark, Lee's men had been pushed so far south that the Brock Road was open to immediate use by Grant and Meade. Gibbs's brigade lost the majority of the 154 Union casualties. Most of them were in his own regiment, which suffered more than 80 casualties, the most casualties of any mounted Union regiment in a single engagement.

After the Confederate infantry beat the Union infantry in a race to Spotsylvania Court House, Sheridan was permitted to conduct a raid in the direction of Richmond in order to draw off the Confederate cavalry and to proceed against them. Confederate Cavalry Corps commander, Maj. Gen. J.E.B. Stuart learned of Sheridan's departure within hours and pursued his more than 10,000 Union cavalrymen with fewer than 5,000 troopers so as to leave General Robert E. Lee with cavalry support. On May 11, 1864, Stuart caught up to Sheridan at the Yellow Tavern, six miles north of Richmond and brought on a general engagement. Colonel Thomas C. Devin's brigade, assisted by Gibbs's brigade, held the Brook Turnpike while other units, including George Armstrong Custer's brigade fought with Stuart's forces. Stuart was mortally wounded by one of Custer's men, according to Longacre, and died the next day.

On May 24, 1864, Sheridan's force returned to the Army of the Potomac and just before the Battle of Cold Harbor, May 26–June 3, 1864, Torbert returned to command of the division, Merritt to command of the Reserve Brigade and Gibbs to command of the 19th New York Volunteer Cavalry Regiment. They engaged in bloody preliminary battles at the Battle of Haw's Shop and the Battle of Old Church or the Battle of Matadequin Creek. Then, they took Confederate positions at Cold Harbor, held them against a counterattack and turned them over to the infantry on June 1, 1964.

Gibbs and his regiment fought with distinction under Maj. Gen. Sheridan at the Battle of Trevilian Station, June 11–12, 1864, part of a diversionary operation by Sheridan against the Virginia Central Railroad during Union Lt. Gen. Grant's stealthy transfer of his forces from the lines after the Battle of Cold Harbor to the south side of the James River in an effort to take Petersburg and Richmond while they were only lightly defended. Torbert and Merritt remained in command of the 1st Division and the Reserve Brigade, respectively, during Sheridan's Trevilian Raid. The Battle of Trevilian Station was the largest all-cavalry battle of the Civil War and it resulted in a victory by Confederate cavalry under the command of Maj. Gen. Wade Hampton. Confederate forces counterattacked the Reserve Brigade early on June 11, 1864, after elements of that brigade attacked advance Confederate pickets. Gibbs quickly mounted his men who left their breakfast unfinished and sent them into battle. The Confederates killed and wounded several Union troopers and took several others prisoner, including Lieutenant Colonel Thorp of the 19th New York Cavalry (1st New York Dragoons). Later, Merritt's brigade had to cut their way through Confederate resistance to free Custer's brigade, which had become surrounded. Although the Reserve Brigade cut through to Custer, Custer lost 22 per cent of his men on that day, most of them missing or captured. After eight hours of fighting on a hot day without food or drink, Gibbs was overcome by sunstroke and had to leave the field. The Union forces sustained heavy losses again on June 12, 1864, and were turned back without achieving their objectives of doing significant damage to the Virginia Central Railroad and linking up with Union Maj. Gen. David Hunter and returning with his force to the Army of the Potomac.

After a period of rest, the brigade took part in the Battle of Darbytown Road on July 27–28, 1864 when it was attacked while dismounted by three brigades of Confederate infantry. Then they marched to the Petersburg lines in time to witness the Battle of the Crater.

=== Shenandoah Valley ===
Gibbs's brigade was transferred to the Shenandoah Valley for service under Sheridan from August 6, 1864. He was with Sheridan in all the battles of the Shenandoah Valley Campaigns of 1864 from that date. Gibbs commanded the Reserve Brigade between August 6, 1864, and September 8, 1864, his regiment between September 9, 1864, and December 8, 1864, while it was with the Second Brigade, the Reserve Brigade between December 13, 1864, and December 30, 1864, the division between December 30, 1864, and January 15, 1864, the brigade between January 15, 1865, and January 18, 1865, and after a short leave of absence between January 19, 1865, and February 5, 1865, the division between February 5, 1865, and February 10, 1865, and the brigade between February 10, 1865, and March 25, 1865. Cullum (1891) states that Gibbs took a short leave of absence after his promotion to brigadier general, which appears to account for his time between January 19, 1865, and February 5, 1865. Gibbs was promoted to brigadier general of U.S. Volunteers as of the date of the 1864 Valley Campaign's decisive Battle of Cedar Creek, Virginia, October 19, 1864, but this promotion did not take effect until December 8, 1864, after it had been confirmed and communicated. Gibbs resigned as colonel of the 19th New York Cavalry on December 8, 1864, when his promotion to brigadier general came through.

On August 11, 1864, the 19th New York Cavalry met an entire division of Confederate Lt. Gen. Jubal Early's force under Maj. Gen. John B. Gordon at the Battle of Newtown. The depleted regiment, armed with 7-shot Spencer repeating rifles, held off the Confederates until they could be reinforced by the rest of the brigade. They suffered 29 killed and seriously wounded and several felled by sunstroke. On August 13, 1864, Confederate guerrilla forces under Col. John S. Mosby destroyed 75 of the brigade's wagons and captured 200 prisoners, including a few of the men of the 19th New York Cavalry. At the Battle of Shepherdstown, near Leetown and Kearneysville, on August 24, 1864, Custer came to the rescue of the surprised and nearly surrounded 19th New York Cavalry (1st New York Dragoons) much as he had been aided by their brigade at Trevilian Station. The brigade and Custer's brigade fought two more sharp engagements at Smithtown on August 28–29, 1864.

On September 9, 1864, the 19th New York Cavalry was transfer to the second brigade of Brig. Gen. Thomas C. Devin. The volunteers welcomed this move because the soldiers of the Regular regiments had fled from the field on more than one occasion and always seemed to get undeserved credit for actions won or carried by the volunteers, as Bowen and other writers from the volunteer ranks such as Capt. R. A. Britton, who is quoted by Bowen, observed. On September 19, 1864, Sheridan's forces attacked Early's forces at the Battle of Opequon or Third Battle of Winchester. The 19th New York Cavalry struck the Confederate outposts on the Opequon Creek at Sewer's Ford, about seven miles northeast of Winchester, Virginia. Captain Alexander K. Thorp, brother of the regiment's Lt. Col. Thomas Thorp, who had been taken prisoner at Trevilian Station, was killed near the beginning of this battle. At a key point in the battle, Devin sent his entire division charging into the Confederate infantry's line of battle inflicting a great number of casualties, including the taking of many prisoners. Devin wrote that Gibbs led his regiment in gallant style. The cavalry charges sent the remaining Confederate infantry fleeing from the field.

After his promotion to brigadier general in December 1864, Gibbs took command of the Reserve Brigade, which became the Third Brigade of the 1st Division of the Cavalry Corps of the Army of the Shenandoah, under Brig. Gen. Wesley Merritt until Merritt's promotion to Sheridan's chief of staff in February 1865. The division then was under the command of Brig. Gen. Thomas Devin. Gibbs led the brigade on Sheridan's raid against the Virginia Central Railroad, the Richmond and Danville Railroad and the James River Canal between February 27, 1865, and March 20, 1865, including the actions against the North Anna and South Anna bridges on March 14–15, 1865.

=== Petersburg; Appomattox ===
Gibbs commanded the brigade after the division's reassignment to the Cavalry Corps of the Army of the Potomac between March 25, 1865, and May 25, 1865. Gibbs's brigade returned to the Siege of Petersburg with Sheridan on March 26, 1865. The brigade included the First, Fifth and Sixth United States Cavalry Regiments, the Second Massachusetts Volunteer Cavalry Regiment and the 6th Pennsylvania Volunteer Cavalry Regiment (6 companies).

On March 31, 1865, Lt. Gen. Grant placed General Sheridan in command of Gouverneur Warren's V Corps of Army of the Potomac infantry and of all cavalry. The two divisions of cavalry from the Army of the Shenandoah in the cavalry corps were under the command of Brig. Gen. Wesley Merritt. Gibbs headed the 3rd Brigade of the 1st Division under the command of Brig. Gen. Thomas Devin. The 3rd Division of this corps was under the command of Brig. Gen. George Custer. The 2nd Division, from the Army of the Potomac, was under the command of Maj. Gen. George Crook. Two cavalry brigades from the cavalry division of the Army of the James under the command of Brig. Gen. Ranald S. Mackenzie also were under Sheridan's overall command.

Merritt's cavalry, including Devin's division which included Gibbs's brigade, played a significant part in the Union Army's near surrounding of the Confederate Army of Northern Virginia and stretching their lines to the breaking point in the last days of the Siege of Petersburg. The brigade fought in the Battle of Dinwiddie Court House on March 29, 1865, and in the action that forced the Confederates to abandon their Petersburg and Richmond, Virginia, defenses at the Battle of Five Forks on April 1, 1865. At the Battle of Dinwiddie Court House, the brigades of Gibbs and John Irvin Gregg were held in reserve until 4:00 when they fought a two-hour action to hold back Confederate Maj. Gen. George E. Pickett's advance toward Dinwiddie Court House. They then rallied with Custer's brigade about three-quarters of a mile from Dinwiddie. Pickett could not achieve a breakthrough before nightfall halted the battle. Both armies concentrated on defenses on March 31. Early on April 1, Pickett learned that Union infantry reinforcements were coming up, so he withdrew his forces northward to Five Forks, which Lee had ordered him to hold at all costs. Devin's cavalry, including Gibbs's brigade, hit the front of Pickett's defense on April 1, 1864, while Brig. Gen. Romeyn B. Ayres infantry division of V Corps hit the left flank and Brig. Gen. Custer's cavalry brigade attacked the right flank. The attack led to the collapse of Pickett's position and required the Confederates to abandon Petersburg and Richmond.

Additional infantry corps and accompanying cavalry were placed under Sheridan's command during the Appomattox Campaign. Gibbs's brigade fought at the Battle of Sayler's Creek, Virginia, on April 6, 1865, three days before the surrender of the Army of Northern Virginia by General Robert E. Lee at Appomattox Court House, Virginia, on April 9, 1865, where Gibbs was present.

Devin's 1st Cavalry Division was the third division after Maj. Gen. Meade and his headquarters staff and General Merritt and his headquarters staff to march in the grand review in Washington on May 23, 1865. Gibbs's brigade marched first in the division. Only the volunteer regiments marched in the review with Gibbs. The 5th U.S. Cavalry Regiment marched as Maj. Gen. Merritt's headquarters escort. Gibb's old regiment, the 19th New York Cavalry (1st New York Dragoons) marched with the next brigade under their final brigade commander, Col. C. L. Fitzhugh.

== Brevet awards; Post-war service; Death ==
Gibbs commanded the 1st Brigade Cavalry Forces, Military Division of the Gulf, between August 20, 1865, and October 17, 1865, and the 1st Division between October 17, 1865, and December 15, 1865. He was mustered out of the volunteer service on February 1, 1866, and became major of the 7th United States Cavalry Regiment.

On January 13, 1866, President Andrew Johnson nominated Gibbs for the award of the honorary rank of brevet major general, United States Volunteers, to rank from March 13, 1865, and the U.S. Senate confirmed the award on March 12, 1866. On July 17, 1866, President Johnson nominated Gibbs for the award of the honorary rank of brevet major general, United States Army (Regular Army), to rank from March 13, 1865, and the U.S. Senate confirmed the award on July 23, 1866. Gibbs received his brevet awards for service at the Battle of Trevilian Station, the Third Battle of Winchester and the Battle of Five Forks.

Gibbs remained in the regular army following the war. After a leave of absence between January 15, 1866, and April 30, 1866, and recruiting service between April 30, 1866, and September 30, 1866, he served in various forts around Kansas, being transferred 9 times in 14 months.

General Gibbs died while on active duty as a major in the 7th U.S. Cavalry at Fort Leavenworth, Kansas, of "congestion of the brain" on December 26, 1868. Alfred Gibbs is buried in St. Mary's Episcopal Churchyard in Portsmouth, Rhode Island.

== Family ==
Gibbs' son, Acting Assistant Surgeon John Blair Gibbs, USN (b. 1858), was killed in action at Guantanamo Bay, Cuba on June 12, 1898. He graduated from Columbia University's School of Physicians and Surgeons in 1882. He was one of the few U.S. Navy officers to die during the Spanish–American War. There is a monument to him, along with five Marines who died with him, at McCalla Hill at the Guantanamo Bay Naval Station. He was buried near to his father. Another son, Alfred W. Gibbs was a noted mechanical engineer.

== See also ==
- List of American Civil War generals (Union)
