= Gabriel Cole (Medal of Honor) =

- Born: March 22, 1831; Broome County, New York
- Died: January 7, 1907 (aged 75); Tustin, Michigan
- Burial place: Sherman Township Cemetery, Tustin, Michigan
- Military career
- Allegiance: United States
- Branch: United States Army; Union Army
- Rank: Corporal
- Unit: 5th Regiment, Michigan Volunteer Cavalry - Company I
- Conflicts: American Civil War • Battle of Opequon
- Awards: Medal of Honor

Gabriel Cole (March 22, 1831 – January 9, 1907) was a Union Army soldier during the American Civil War. He received the Medal of Honor for gallantry and the capture of the flag of the 45th Virginia Infantry Regiment during the Battle of Opequon more commonly called the Third Battle of Winchester, Virginia on September 19, 1864.

== Medal of Honor citation ==
“The President of the United States of America, in the name of Congress, takes pleasure in presenting the Medal of Honor to Corporal Gabriel Cole, United States Army, for extraordinary heroism on 19 September 1864, while serving with Company I, 5th Michigan Cavalry, in action at Winchester, Virginia, for capture of flag, during which he was wounded in the leg.”

Corporal Cole was one of two members of the 5th Michigan Cavalry to receive the Medal of Honor for this action. The other was Sgt. Henry M. Fox.

== See also ==
- List of Medal of Honor recipients
- List of American Civil War Medal of Honor recipients: A–F
