= 5th Michigan Cavalry Regiment =

Cavalry regiment in the Union Army

- Michigan state flag
- Active: August 30, 1862, to June 23, 1866
- Country: United States
- Allegiance: Union
- Branch: Cavalry
- Engagements: American Civil War; Battle of Winchester; Battle of Cedar Mountain; Battle of Second Bull Run; Battle of Gettysburg; Kilpatrick's Raid on Richmond; Battle of the Wilderness; Battle of Yellow Tavern; Battle of Cedar Creek; Battle of Five Forks; Appomattox

Commanders
- Notable commanders: Joseph Tarr Copeland; Russell A. Alger

The 5th Michigan Cavalry Regiment was a cavalry regiment that served in the Union Army during the American Civil War. It was a part of the famed Michigan Brigade, commanded for a time by Brigadier General George Armstrong Custer.

== Service ==
Organized in Detroit, Michigan, the 5th Michigan Cavalry was mustered into service on August 30, 1862, and left for Washington, D.C., on December 4 of that year. The regiment served in the defenses of the capital until June 1863, when it joined the Cavalry Corps of the Army of the Potomac. Over the next month, the 5th Michigan Cavalry took part in several major battles, including the Battle of Hanover on June 30, the Battle of Gettysburg from July 1 to July 3, and the Battle of Williamsport from July 6 to July 14. The regiment then participated in a series of smaller engagements followed by the Battle of Mine Run from November 26 to December 2.

Early in 1864 came the Battle of Morton's Ford, on February 6 and 7, and three months later the Overland Campaign began. The 5th Michigan saw action in several battles of this campaign, including the Battle of the Wilderness on May 6 and 7, the Battle of Totopotomoy Creek from May 28 to 31, and the Battle of Cold Harbor from May 31 to June 1. After the First Battle of Deep Bottom on July 27 and 28, the unit was ordered back towards Washington, D.C., to take part in Sheridan's Shenandoah Valley Campaign from August to October. The 5th Michigan saw action in the Battles of Trevilian Station, Opequon, Fisher's Hill, and Cedar Creek. The next spring, in late March and early April 1865, the regiment took part in a series of battles of the Appomattox Campaign: at Dinwiddie Court House, Five Forks, Sayler's Creek, Appomattox Station, and finally Appomattox Court House, which ended with the surrender of the Confederate Army. After participating in one last expedition, the regiment headed to Washington in May, where it took part in the Grand Review of the Armies.

The regiment was moved to Fort Leavenworth, Kansas, on June 1 before being mustered out of service on June 23, 1865. Veterans and recruits were transferred to the 1st Michigan Volunteer Cavalry Regiment.

== Total strength and casualties ==
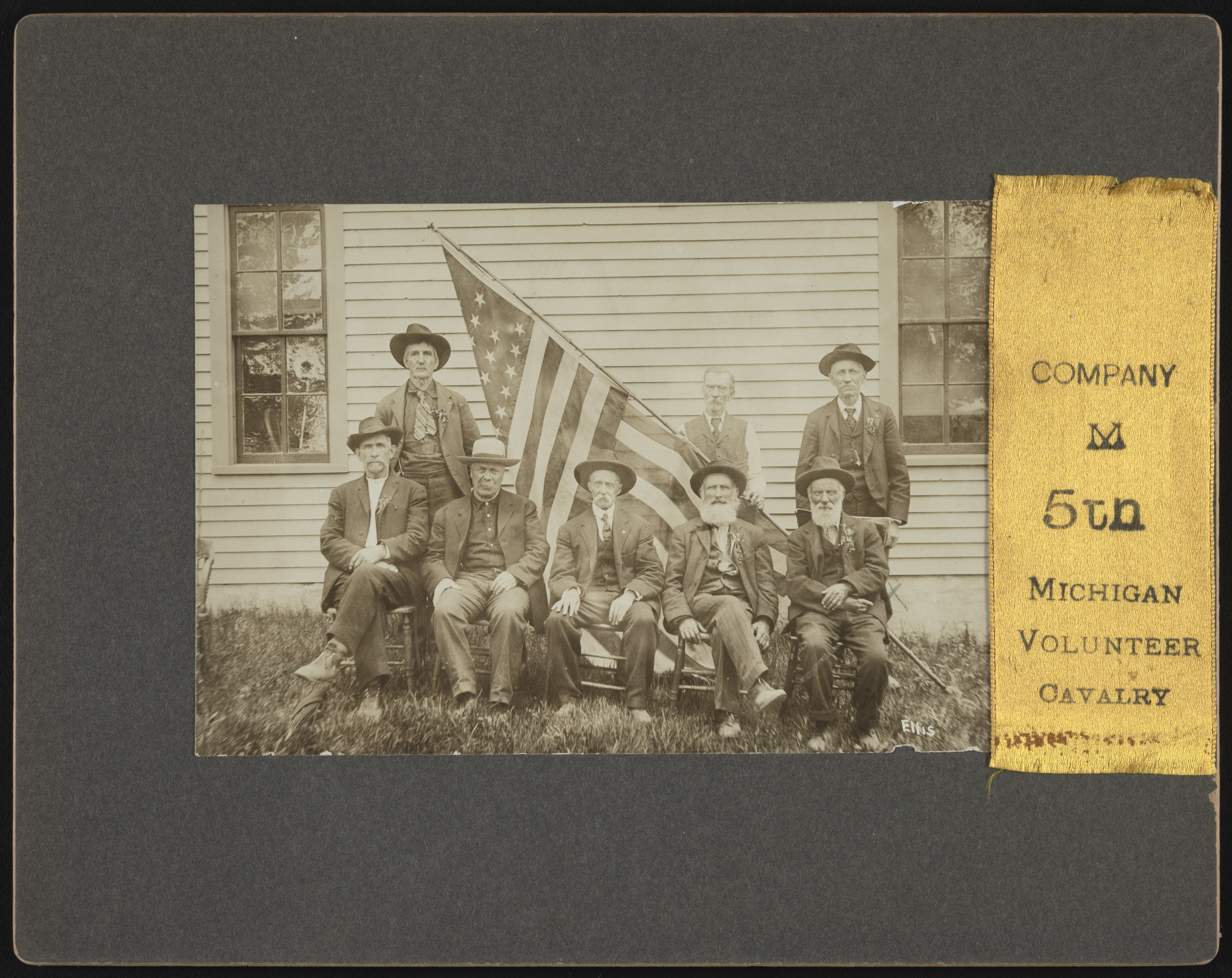
Post Civil War reunion of Veterans of Company M 5th Michigan Cavalry

The regiment suffered 6 officers and 135 enlisted men killed in action or mortally wounded and 3 officers and 322 enlisted men who died of disease, for a total of 466 fatalities.

== Notable soldiers ==
Russell A. Alger served as commander of the 5th Michigan Cavalry beginning in February 1863; he later became the Governor of Michigan, U.S. Secretary of War, and a U.S. Senator. Among the initial officers of the regiment was William d'Alton Mann, a future newspaper and magazine publisher. Future United States Representative from Michigan Jonas H. McGowan served in the 5th until November 1862, when he accepted a captaincy in the 9th Michigan Cavalry. A 5th Michigan cavalryman was responsible for the death of Confederate Major General J.E.B. Stuart; during the Battle of Yellow Tavern, Private John A. Huff of Company E shot and mortally wounded the general.

Lieutenant Colonel Edward Merwin Lee was brevetted Brigadier General and later became the first Secretary of State of Wyoming.

Noah Ferry (of the Ferry Family) served as a Major in Michigan's 5th Cavalry. He was killed at the Battle of Gettysburg.

Three men earned the Medal of Honor while serving with the 5th Michigan Cavalry. Captain Smith H. Hastings of Company M was awarded the medal for his actions during an engagement in Newby's Crossroads, Virginia, on July 24, 1863. Two enlisted men, Corporal Gabriel Cole of Company I and Sergeant Henry M. Fox of Company M, received the medal for capturing battle flags during the Battle of Opequon at Winchester, Virginia, on September 19, 1864.

Crawley P. Dake raised a company of volunteers for the 5th Michigan Cavalry. He was later a U.S. Marshal in the Arizona Territory from 1878 to 1882 noted for introducing new techniques and helping to improve working relationships between law enforcement officers. He was noted for his creativity and ability for deputizing civilian posses after the Posse Comitatus Act of 1878 was passed.

== See also ==
- List of Michigan Civil War Units
- Michigan in the American Civil War
