= 1st New York Dragoons Regiment =

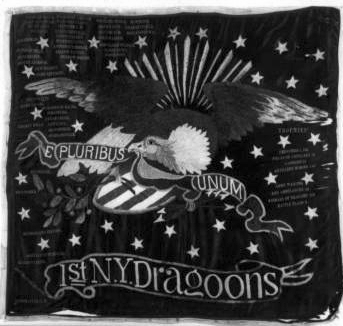
- New York flag
- Active: July 28, 1863, to June 30, 1865
- Country: United States
- Allegiance: Union
- Branch: Cavalry
- Size: 1,414
- Engagements: American Civil War: Battle of Cold Harbor; Battle of Trevilian Station; Battle of Opequon; Battle of Cedar Creek; Battle of Waynesboro, Virginia; Battle of Five Forks; Battle of Appomattox Court House

The 1st New York Dragoons Regiment was a cavalry regiment that served in the Union Army during the American Civil War.

== Service ==
Originally mustered into service as the 130th New York Volunteer Infantry Regiment it was converted to cavalry on July 28, 1863, and designated as the 19th Regiment New York Volunteer Cavalry. The men were recruited from Allegany, Livingston, and Wyoming counties. The 19th Cavalry was officially re-designated as the 1st Regiment of Dragoons on September 10, 1863. The term dragoon generally refers to mounted infantry or light cavalry.

Originally assigned to the Cavalry Corps, Army of the Potomac the Dragoons moved to the Army of the Shenandoah with General Philip Sheridan.

During its service, the 1st New York Dragoons fought in 64 battles, captured 19 pieces of artillery and four Confederate battle flags. After marching in the Grand Review at Washington D.C. at the close of the Civil War, the Dragoons were mustered out of service at Cloud’s Mills, Virginia, on June 30, 1865.

== Medals of Honor ==
Two enlisted men and one officer of the 1st New York Dragoons were awarded the Medal of Honor for gallantry during the Civil War.

- Corporal Chester B. Bowen
- Commissary Sergeant Andrew J. Lorish
- First Lieutenant William W. Winegar

== Casualties ==
The regiment suffered 4 officers and 127 enlisted men who were killed in action or mortally wounded and 1 officer and 142 enlisted men who died of disease, for a total of 274 fatalities; of whom 36 enlisted men died in Confederate prisons.

== Commanders ==
- Colonel Alfred Gibbs
- Colonel Thomas Jones Thorp

== See also ==
- List of New York Civil War regiments
