= Patrick H. McEnroe =

American Civil War soldier

- Born: 1822 or 1823; Ireland
- Died: Unknown
- Military career
- Allegiance: United States
- Branch: United States Army; Union Army
- Service years: 1862 - 1865
- Rank: Sergeant
- Unit: 6th New York Cavalry Regiment
- Conflicts: American Civil War • Battle of Opequon
- Awards: Medal of Honor

Patrick H. McEnroe was a Union Army soldier during the American Civil War in the 6th New York Cavalry Regiment. He received the Medal of Honor for gallantry during the Battle of Opequon more commonly called the Third Battle of Winchester, Virginia on September 19, 1864.

Aged 39, McEnroe enlisted in the Army from Schodack, New York in November 1862. He was mustered out in June 1865.

== Medal of Honor citation ==
"The President of the United States of America, in the name of Congress, takes pleasure in presenting the Medal of Honor to Sergeant Patrick H. McEnroe, United States Army, for extraordinary heroism on 19 September 1864, while serving with Company D, 6th New York Cavalry Regiment, in action at Winchester, Virginia, for capture of colors of 36th Virginia Infantry (Confederate States of America)."

Sgt. McEnroe was one of two troopers of the 6th New York Cavalry to receive the Medal of Honor for this action. The other was Farrier George E. Meach.

== See also ==
- List of Medal of Honor recipients
- List of American Civil War Medal of Honor recipients: M-P
