= George E. Meach =

- Born: c. 1844; New York City
- Died: March 21, 1873; New York City
- Burial place: Pine Grove Cemetery, Fillmore, New York
- Military career
- Allegiance: United States
- Branch: United States Army; Union Army
- Service years: 1861 - 1865
- Rank: Sergeant
- Units: (New York (state)) Company I, 6th New York Cavalry Regiment
- Conflicts: American Civil War • Battle of Opequon
- Awards: Medal of Honor

George E. Meach (c. 1844 – March 21, 1873) was a Union Army soldier during the American Civil War. He received the Medal of Honor for gallantry during the Battle of Opequon more commonly called the Third Battle of Winchester, Virginia on September 19, 1864.

Meach enlisted in the Army from New York in November 1861, and was assigned to the 6th New York Cavalry. He transferred to the 2nd New York Provisional Cavalry in June 1865, and was discharged in August.

== Medal of Honor citation ==
The President of the United States of America, in the name of Congress, takes pleasure in presenting the Medal of Honor to Farrier George E. Meach, United States Army, for extraordinary heroism on 19 September 1864, while serving with Company I, 6th New York Cavalry, in action at Winchester, Virginia, for capture of flag."

Meach was one of two troopers of the 6th New York Cavalry to receive the Medal of Honor for this action. The other was Sgt. Patrick H. McEnroe.

== See also ==
- List of Medal of Honor recipients
- List of American Civil War Medal of Honor recipients: M-P
