= Andrew J. Lorish =

American Civil War Medal of Honor recipient (1832–1897)

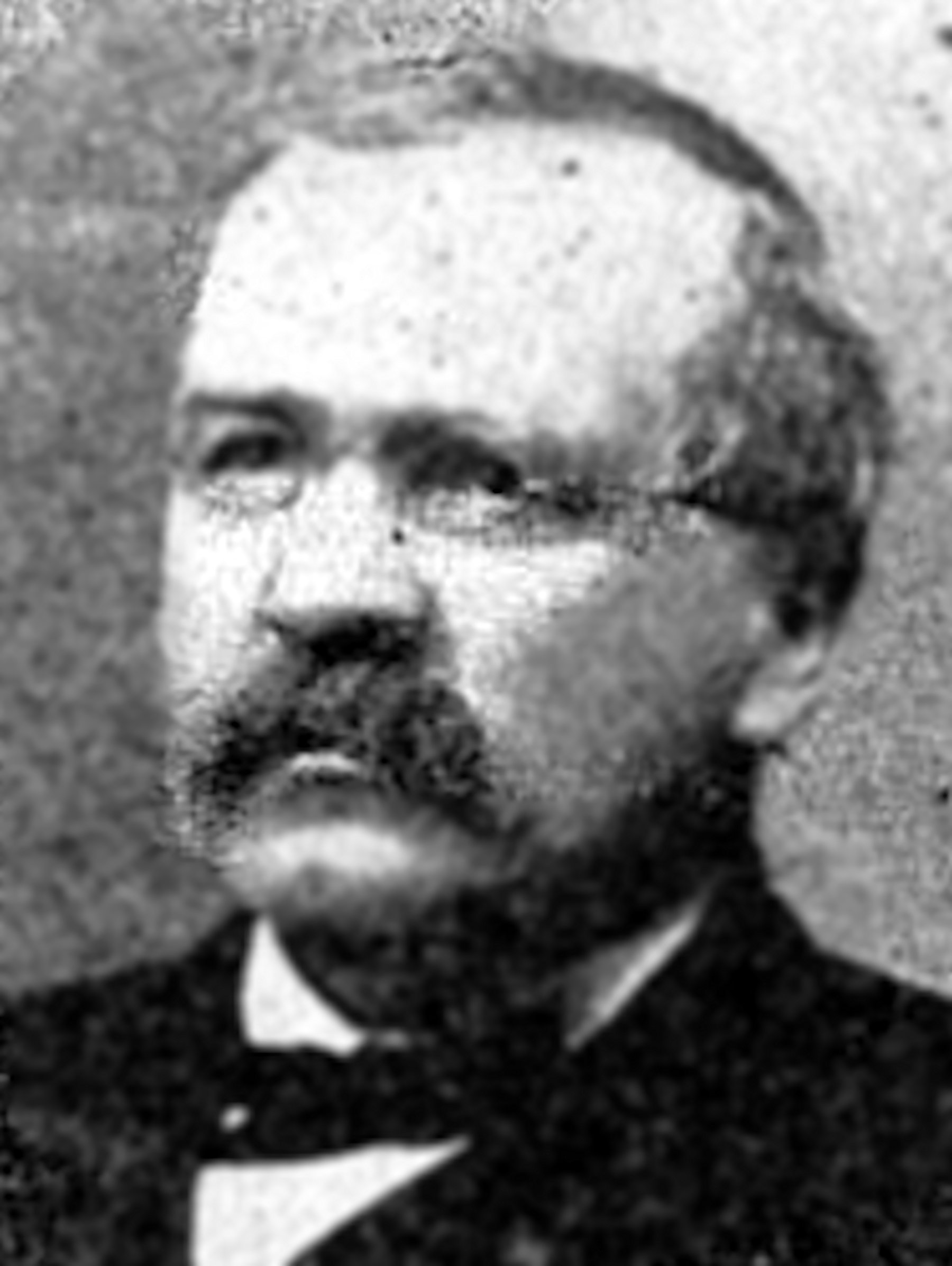
- Born: November 8, 1832; Dansville, Steuben County, New York, U.S.
- Died: August 11, 1897 (aged 64); Warsaw, Wyoming County, New York, U.S.
- Burial place: Forest Hill Cemetery, Attica, New York, U.S.
- Military career
- Allegiance: United States of America; Union
- Branch: United States Army; Union Army
- Service years: 1862 - 1865
- Rank: Second Lieutenant
- Unit: (New York (state)) 1st New York Dragoons
- Conflicts: American Civil War
- Awards: Medal of Honor

Andrew J. Lorish (November 8, 1832–August 11, 1897) was a Commissary Sergeant in the Union Army and a Medal of Honor recipient for his actions in the American Civil War.

Lorish joined the 1st New York Dragoons from Attica, New York in August 1862. He was promoted to regimental sergeant major the next month, but demoted to private before the end of the year. In October 1863 he became the regimental commissary sergeant. He was commissioned as a second lieutenant in May 1865, and mustered out with his regiment in June.

Lorish is buried in Forest Hill Cemetery, Attica, New York.

== Medal of Honor citation ==
Rank and organization: Commissary Sergeant, 19th New York Cavalry (1st New York Dragoons). Place and date: At Winchester, Va., September 19, 1864. Entered service at:------. Born: November 8, 1832, Dansville, Steuben County, N.Y. Date of issue: September 27, 1864

Citation:

Amid the enemy he grabbed the flag from a color bearer who then called for help. When the bearer's comrades were readying their rifles he dashed directly at them securing their disarming. As he rode away, the Confederates picked up their guns firing at the captor of their flag.

Sgt. Lorish was one of two members of the 1st New York Dragoons to receive the Medal of Honor in this action. The other was Corporal Chester B. Bowen. The flag that was captured by Bowen and Lorish was a CSA second national flag belonging to an unidentified unit in Col George S. Patton's Virginia Infantry Brigade. The flag is now in the possession of the Museum of the Confederacy in Richmond, Virginia.

== See also ==
- List of Medal of Honor recipients
- List of American Civil War Medal of Honor recipients: G–L
