= Chester B. Bowen =

Recipient of the Medal of Honor

- Born: April 1, 1842; Nunda, New York
- Died: March 16, 1905 (aged 62); Texas
- Burial place: Greenwood Cemetery, Greenwood, Texas
- Military career
- Allegiance: United States
- Branch: United States Army; Union Army
- Service years: 1862 - 1865
- Rank: Corporal
- Unit: (New York (state)) 1st Regiment New York Dragoons
- Conflicts: American Civil War • Battle of Opequon
- Awards: Medal of Honor

Chester Bennett Bowen (April 1, 1842 – March 16, 1905) was a Union soldier during the American Civil War. He received the Medal of Honor for gallantry during the Battle of Opequon more commonly called the Third Battle of Winchester, Virginia on September 19, 1864. Corporal Bowen was one of two members of the 1st New York Dragoons to receive the Medal of Honor for this action. The other was Sgt. Andrew J. Lorish.

== Medal of Honor citation ==
"The President of the United States of America, in the name of Congress, takes pleasure in presenting the Medal of Honor to Corporal Chester Bennett Bowen, United States Army, for extraordinary heroism on 19 September 1864, while serving with Company I, 19th New York Cavalry (1st New York Dragoons), in action at Winchester, Virginia, for capture of flag."

Action Date: September 19, 1864 Service: Army Rank: Corporal Company: Company I Division: 1st New York Dragoons (19th NY Cavalry)

The flag that was captured by Bowen was a CSA second national flag belonging to an unidentified unit in Col George S. Patton's Virginia Infantry Brigade. The flag is now in the possession of the Museum of the Confederacy in Richmond, Virginia.

== See also ==
- List of Medal of Honor recipients
- List of American Civil War Medal of Honor recipients: A–F
