= 11th Indiana Infantry Regiment =

11th Regiment, Indiana Volunteer Infantry "11th Indiana Zouaves"
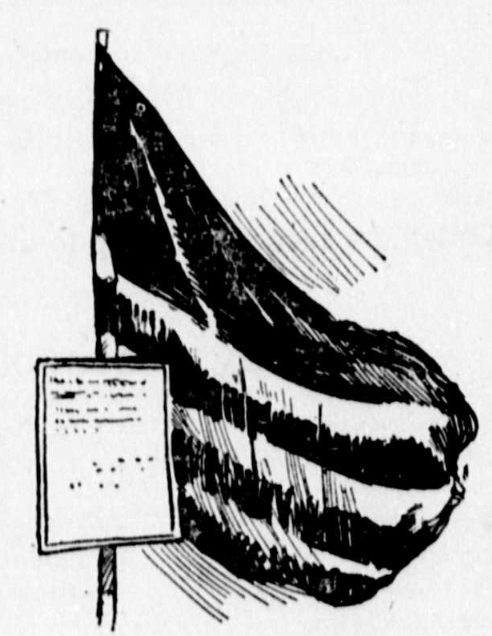
- National color of the regiment
- Active: April 25 – August 2, 1861; August 31, 1861 – July 26, 1865
- Country: United States
- Allegiance: Union
- Branch: Union Army
- Type: Infantry Zouaves
- Size: Regiment
- Nickname(s): Wallace's Zouaves
- Engagements: American Civil War: Raid on Romney (1861); Battle of Fort Henry; Battle of Fort Donelson; Battle of Shiloh; Siege of Corinth; Helena Expedition; Battle of Port Gibson; Battle of Champion Hill; Siege of Vicksburg; Jackson expedition; Battle of Bayou Bourbeux; Third Battle of Winchester; Battle of Fisher's Hill; Battle of Cedar Creek

Commanders
- Colonel: Lew Wallace
- Colonel: George F. McGinnis
- Colonel: Daniel Macauley

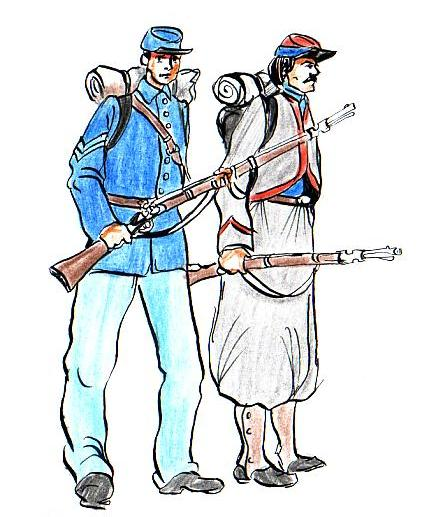
A drawing of Union army corporal and 11th Indiana Zouave

The 11th Indiana Zouaves (officially, "11th Regiment, Indiana Volunteer Infantry") was an infantry regiment that served in the Union Army during the American Civil War.

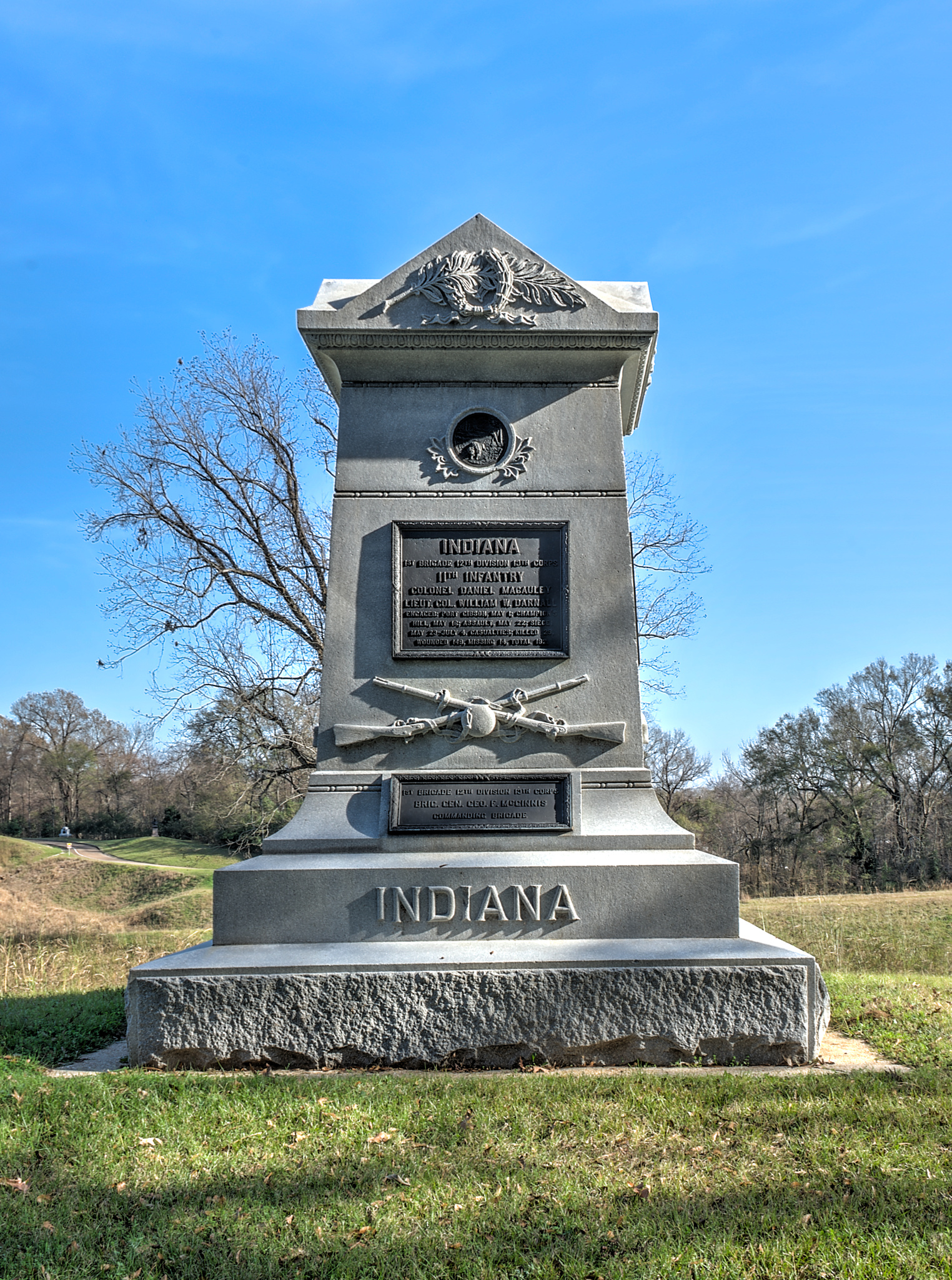
11th Indiana Infantry Monument at Vicksburg National Military Park

== Service ==
=== 3 Month ===
The 11th Indiana was enlisted in Indianapolis, Indiana, to serve 90 days, with Lew Wallace as its colonel and George McGinnis as lieutenant colonel. The regiment was sent to western Virginia and saw only minimal action during a raid on the town of Romney. It then returned to Indianapolis to be mustered out as its enlistment had expired.

The initial organization of the regiment for 3-months service is as follows:

Company	Earliest Moniker	Primary Place of Recruitment	Earliest Captain
A	City Greys	Indianapolis and Marion County	Robert Sanford Foster
B	Zouave Guards or Fahnestock Zouaves	Marion County	John Fahnestock
C	Fort Harrison Guard Zouaves	Terre Haute and Vigo County	Jesse E. Hamill
D	Vigo Guards	Terre Haute and Vigo County	Jabez Smith
E	Indianapolis Zouavez	Indianapolis and Marion County	DeWitt Clinton Rugg
F	Rumsey Guards and Wallace Guards	Tippecanoe County and Tipton County	Edward Test Wallace
G	National Guards or Kokomo Rifles	Vigo County and Montgomery County	Henry Montgomery Carr
H	Independent Zouaves	Indianapolis and Marion County	William J.H. Robinson
I	Montgomery Guards	Montgomery County	Lew Wallace
K	Zouave Guards and Ladoga Blues	Indianapolis and Marion County	George Francis McGinnis

=== 3 Year ===
The 11th Indiana was reorganized in Indianapolis with Wallace and McGinnis returning as colonel and lieutenant colonel. Wallace trained the 11th Indiana in Zouave tactics and the regiment became known as Wallace's Zouaves. The uniform consisted of a grey jacket with red trimming, a grey kepi with red braiding, a dark blue zouave vest, and grey pantaloons. Later they received a new uniform consisting of a black zouave jacket with skyblue trimming, a red kepi with a dark blue band, and sky blue pantaloons. The regiment was sent to Paducah, Kentucky and from there joined Ulysses S. Grant's expedition against Fort Henry. Before they went into action, Wallace was promoted to brigadier general and McGinnis became the regiment's colonel. McGinnis led the regiment at Fort Henry, Fort Donelson and Shiloh. After Shiloh, McGinnis was promoted to brigadier general and Daniel Macauley became regimental colonel. Macauley led the regiment during the Vicksburg Campaign and the subsequent siege of Vicksburg.

After the fall of Vicksburg, the 11th Indiana was transferred for duty in the Department of the Gulf. In July, 1864 the regiment was ordered to Washington, DC and joined Philip Sheridan's Army of the Shenandoah. With Macauley in command the regiment fought at the battles of Opequon, Fisher's Hill and Cedar Creek. It remained on garrison duty in the Shenandoah Valley until it was mustered out on July 26, 1865.

== Legacy ==
The USL franchise, Indy Eleven, was named specifically for the 11th Indiana Infantry.

== See also ==
- List of Indiana Civil War regiments
- Indiana in the Civil War

== Notes/References/Sources ==
Notes

Sources

- Dyer, Frederick Henry (1908). A Compendium of the War of the Rebellion (PDF). Des Moines, IA: Dyer Pub. Co. p. 1122. ASIN B01BUFJ76Q. This article incorporates text from this source, which is in the public domain.
- Federal Publishing Company (1908). Military Affairs and Regimental Histories of New Jersey, Indiana, Illinois and Michigan (PDF). The Union Army: A History of Military Affairs in the Loyal States, 1861–65 – Records of the Regiments in the Union army – Cyclopedia of battles – Memoirs of Commanders and Soldiers. Vol. III. Madison, WI: Federal Publishing Company. pp. 114–115. OCLC 694018100. This article incorporates text from this source, which is in the public domain.
- Durham, Thomas Wise (2003). Patrick, Jeffrey L. (ed.). Three years with Wallace's Zouaves : the Civil War memoirs of Thomas Wise Durham. Macon, GA: Mercer University Press. ISBN 978-0-86554-822-0. OCLC 52271733.
- Terrell, William Henry Harrison (1865). Report of the Adjutant General of the State of Indiana (pdf). Indiana Adjutant General Reports. Vol. II. Indianapolis, IN: A.H. Connor State Printer. pp. 75–86. OCLC 558004259. This article incorporates text from this source, which is in the public domain.
- "Indiana Battle Flag Inventory". Indiana War Memorial. May 4, 2021. This article incorporates text from this source, which is in the public domain.
