= 1854 in poetry =

'Forward, the Light Brigade!'

Was there a man dismay'd?
Not tho' the soldiers knew

Some one had blunder'd:

Their's not to make reply,
Their's not to reason why,
Their's but to do and die:
Into the valley of Death

Rode the six hundred.

— From "The Charge of the Light Brigade" by Alfred, Lord Tennyson, first published this year

Nationality words link to articles with information on the nation's poetry or literature (for instance, Irish or France).

== Works published in English ==
=== United Kingdom ===
The Charge of the Light Brigade

Half a league, half a league,
Half a league onward,
All in the valley of Death
Rode the six hundred.
'Forward, the Light Brigade!
Charge for the guns' he said:
Into the valley of Death
Rode the six hundred.

'Forward, the Light Brigade!'
Was there a man dismay'd?
Not tho' the soldiers knew
Some one had blunder'd:
Theirs not to make reply,
Theirs not to reason why,
Theirs but to do and die:
Into the valley of Death
Rode the six hundred.

Cannon to right of them,
Cannon to left of them,
Cannon in front of them
Volley'd and thunder'd;
Storm'd at with shot and shell,
Boldly they rode and well,
Into the jaws of Death,
Into the mouth of Hell
Rode the six hundred.

Flash'd all their sabres bare,
Flash'd as they turned in air
Sabring the gunners there,
Charging an army while
All the world wonder'd:
Plunged in the battery-smoke
Right thro' the line they broke;
Cossack and Russian
Reel'd from the sabre-stroke
Shatter'd and sunder'd.
Then they rode back, but not
Not the six hundred.

Cannon to right of them,
Cannon to left of them,
Cannon behind them
Volley'd and thunder'd;
Storm'd at with shot and shell,
While horse and hero fell,
They that had fought so well
Came thro' the jaws of Death,
Back from the mouth of Hell,
All that was left of them,
Left of six hundred.

When can their glory fade?
O the wild charge they made!
All the world wonder'd.
Honour the charge they made!
Honour the Light Brigade,
Noble six hundred!

—Alfred, Lord Tennyson
- William Allingham, Day and Night Songs
- W. E. Aytoun, writing under the pen name "T. Percy Jones", Firmilian; or, The Student of Badajoz, subtitle: "A Spasmodic tragedy"
- Thomas De Quincey, Selections Grave and Gay, including biographical essays (originally published in Tait's Edinburgh Magazine in 1834, 1835, 1839 and 1840) on some of the Lake Poets (see also Recollections of the Lakes and the Lake Poets 1860, in which all of the Recollections essays were published)
- Eliza Craven Green, "Ellan Vannin" (later set to music)
- John Keats, The Poetical Works of John Keats, edited by Richard Monckton Milnes; posthumously published
- Coventry Patmore, "The Angel in the House", Part I, also known as The Betrothal (see also The Espousals 1856, Faithful for Ever 1860, The Victories of Love 1863)
- Alfred, Lord Tennyson, "The Charge of the Light Brigade" published in The Examiner on December 9

=== United States ===
- Benjamin Paul Blood, The Bride of the Iconoclast
- William Cullen Bryant, Poems
- Phoebe Cary, Poems and Parodies
- William J. Grayson, The Hireling and the Slave
- William Howe Cuyler Hosmer, Poetical Works
- Julia Ward Howe, Passion Flowers
- Frances Harper, Poems on Miscellaneous Subjects

== Works published in other languages ==
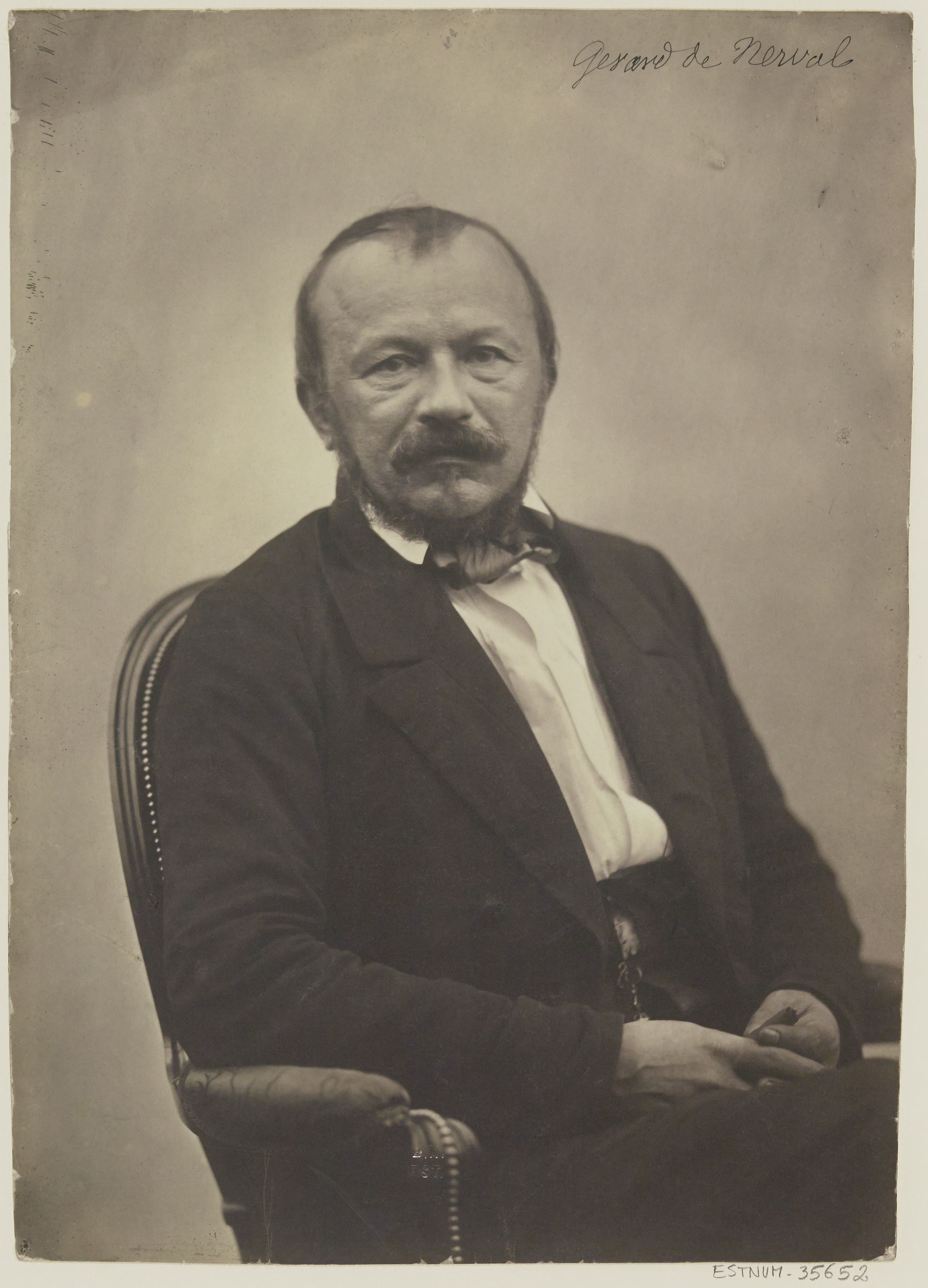
Gérard de Nerval, photographed about this year by Nadar

=== France ===
- Louise Colet:
  - Ce qu'on rêve en aimant
  - L'Acropole d'Athènes
- Gérard de Nerval, The Chimeras (French: Les Chimères), poems appended to the author's book of short stories, Les Filles du feu
- Tiouttchev, Poésies

=== Other ===
- Heinrich Heine, Gedichte. 1853 und 1854 ("Poems. 1853 and 1854"), German poet and author living in France

== Births ==
Death years link to the corresponding "[year] in poetry" article:

- January 9 – Govind Vasudev Kanitkar (died 1918), Indian, Marathi-language poet and translator
- April 13 – William Henry Drummond (died 1907), Canadian
- September 24 – George Frederick Cameron (died 1885), Canadian
- October 16 – Oscar Wilde (died 1900), Irish-born playwright and poet
- October 20
  - Alphonse Allais (died 1905), French humorist
  - Arthur Rimbaud (died 1891), French
- November 19 – Danske Dandridge, born Caroline Bedinger (died 1914), Denmark-born American

== Deaths ==
Birth years link to the corresponding "[year] in poetry" article:

- January 12 — Eliza Townsend (born 1788), American
- March 29 – Charlotte Caroline Richardson (born 1796), English
- April 3 – John Wilson (born 1785), Scots
- April 16 – Julia Nyberg (born 1784), Swedish poet and songwriter
- April 24 – Gabriele Rossetti (born 1783), English
- April 30 – James Montgomery (born 1771), Scots
- November – Mohammad Ibrahim Zauq (born 1790), Urdu
- December 9 – Almeida Garrett (born 1799), Portuguese

== See also ==
- 19th century in poetry
- 19th century in literature
- List of years in poetry
- List of years in literature
- Victorian literature
- French literature of the 19th century
- Poetry
