= Mount Washington (disambiguation) =

Mount Washington is a mountain in New Hampshire.

Mount Washington or Mt. Washington may also refer to:

== Places ==
=== Landforms ===
- List of peaks named Mount Washington
- Mount Washington, Pittsburgh (mountain)

=== Communities in the United States ===
Listed alphabetically by state

- Mount Washington, Los Angeles, California
- Mount Washington, Kentucky
- Mount Washington, Baltimore, Maryland
- Mount Washington, Massachusetts
- Mount Washington, Cincinnati, Ohio
- Mount Washington, Pittsburgh (neighborhood), Pennsylvania

== Ships ==
- MS Mount Washington, a sightseeing vessel on Lake Winnipesaukee, New Hampshire, U.S.
- SS Mount Washington (T-AOT-5076), a transport oiler of the Ready Reserve Fleet of the United States Maritime Administration
- USS Mount Washington (1846), a steamer purchased by the Union Navy during the American Civil War

== Other uses ==
- Darnell Washington, American football player, nicknamed "Mount Washington"
- "Mt. Washington", a song by Local Natives from their 2013 album Hummingbird

== See also ==
- Washington (disambiguation)
