= Robert Jordan (sailor) =

Robert Jordan (1826 - December 21, 1881) was an American sailor and recipient of the Medal of Honor who received the award for his actions in the American Civil War.

== Biography ==
Jordan was born in New York, New York in 1826. He served in the Union Navy as coxswain aboard the USS Mount Washington during the American Civil War. He earned his medal in action aboard USS Mount Washington on the Nansemond River, Virginia on April 14, 1863. He received his medal on July 10, 1863. He died in Philadelphia, Pennsylvania on December 21, 1881, and is now buried in Mount Moriah Cemetery, Philadelphia, Pennsylvania where his name is spelled as "Jourdan".

== Medal of Honor Citation ==
For extraordinary heroism in action while attached to the USS Minnesota and temporarily serving on the USS Mount Washington, during action against the enemy in the Nansemond River, Virginia, 14 April 1863. When the Mount Washington drifted against the bank following several successive hits which struck her boilers and stopped her engines, Coxswain Jordan boarded the stricken vessel and, for six hours as fierce artillery and musketry continued to rake her decks, calmly assisted in manning a 12-pound howitzer which had been mounted on the open hurricane deck.
