= USS Lamson =

Three ships of the United States Navy have been named USS Lamson in honor of Roswell Lamson.

- USS Lamson (DD-18), was a destroyer, commissioned in 1910 and decommissioned in 1919
- USS Lamson (DD-328), was commissioned in 1921 and decommissioned in 1930
- USS Lamson (DD-367), was commissioned in 1936 and sunk during Operation Crossroads in 1946
