= Marius Robinson =

American minister, abolitionist, and newspaper editor

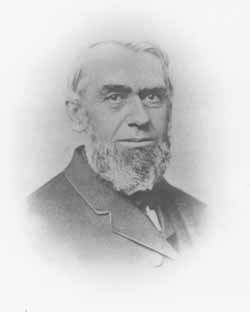
- Born: Marius Racine Robinson; July 29, 1806; Dalton, Massachusetts, US
- Died: December 9, 1878 (aged 72); Salem, Ohio, US
- Occupation(s): Minister, abolitionist, newspaper publisher
- Known for: Abolitionist lecturer, newspaper editor, and leader
- Spouse: Emily Rakestraw Robinson

Marius Robinson (1806–1878) was an American minister, abolitionist, and newspaper editor of the antislavery newspaper The Philanthropist and The Anti-Slavery Bugle. He helped establish a school for African Americans in Cincinnati, Ohio while attending Lane Seminary. Responding to backlash from the city's residents, he continued to teach and was one of the Lane Rebels who would not be pressured to give up improving the lives of African Americans. He was an anti-slavery lecturer. He worked together with his wife Emily Rakestraw Robinson, to better the lives of African Americans.

== Early life ==
Marius Racine Robinson, the son of strict Presbyterian parents, was born on July 29, 1806, in Dalton, Massachusetts. In 1816, the Robinson family moved to Orville, Chautauqua County, New York. When he was 15, he attended evangelist Charles Grandison Finney's revival and experienced a conversion and felt a religious calling to be of service to others.

== Apprenticeship and education ==
Realizing that he would need to work and save his earnings to attain an education, Robinson worked as an apprentice for four years. He learned the bookbinding and printing trade at Merrill and Hastings in Utica, New York, beginning in 1823. Reading the books and pamphlets produced by the firm was also informative. His uncle, Reverend Arthur Darwin of Rigo, New York privately educated Robinson. During the term of his apprenticeship, he attended Bible study classes and taught Sabbath school.

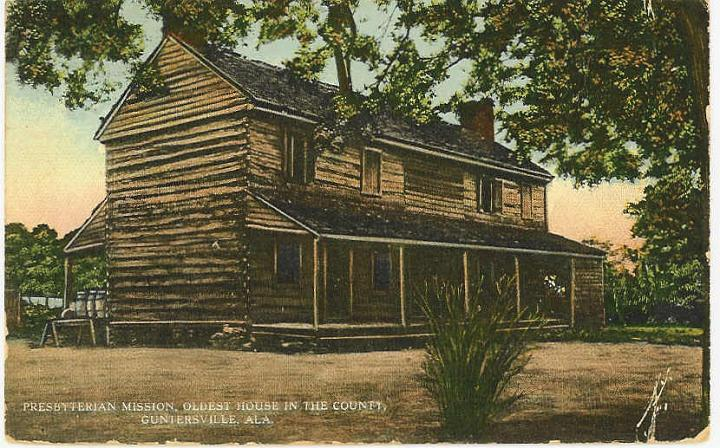
Creek Path Mission, Marshall County, Alabama

In 1829, his education continued under the missionary and scholar Reverend Potter at the Creek Path Mission in the Cherokee Nation. As an assistant, he worked with the Native American children. After one year, he accepted a position as an assistant at the Presbyterian Church in Florence, Alabama. Around 1829, Robinson found his personal beliefs aligned with those of the Second Great Awakening, which was led by Charles Grandison Finney. He believed in the importance of good works and humanitarian reforms, which led to abolitionism and the anti-slavery movement.

Robinson enrolled at the University of Nashville's five-year program in the fall of 1830. He studied theology, and some of his teachers were suspicious of his liberal views. He graduated with high honors in 1832, but he did not receive his diploma until he delivered a lecture on a test question, with approval by the North Alabama Presbytery. While at the University of Nashville, Robinson met Theodore Weld, a liberal theologian and co-founder of the Lane Seminary in Cincinnati, Ohio. Robinson enrolled at Lane Seminary that taught Charles Grandison Finney's New School principles.

Robinson was among the Lane students who were committed to abolitionism and were directly involved in practices to aid African Americans. He took a year off from the seminary to help Augustus Wattles establish a school for Black adults and children. The curriculum included arithmetic, grammar, geography, natural philosophy, and Bible study. Some of the city's residents were critical of educational and other abolitionist activities. After the school's Board of Trustees ordered the students to stop their projects, Robinson and 39 other students protested and withdrew from the seminary. Called the Lane Rebels, they were the most influential group of abolitionists in the West.

== Career ==
After Lane Seminary, Robinson and Augustus Wattles remained in Cincinnati, where he served the local free Black population as a teacher and missionary. In 1834, several women responded to an ad in the New York Evangelist for women to teach Cincinnati's Black women. One of them was Emily Rakestraw, a Quaker from New Garden, Ohio. It was essentially a volunteer position in which they immersed themselves in the African American community and worked long hours in Cincinnati's schools. At the time, many of Cincinnati's residents were anti-abolitionists, and they did not condone efforts to condemn slavery, promote equality, and educate the city's Black people. In fear of retribution, this helped bond the abolitionists with one another. Robinson and Rakestraw, who married, worked together as abolitionists throughout their lives. Robertson, author of Hearts Beating for Liberty said that "No couple better symbolizes the symmetry and success of men's and women's connections in the western abolitionist movement than Marius and Emily Rakestraw."

In 1836, he was ordained as an evangelist by the New York Central Evangelical Association of Jamestown, New York. He was commissioned "to labor in and with the churches to arouse them to a sense of their responsibility in the institution of American slavery".

In 1836, Robinson was hired by the antislavery newspaper The Philanthropist, which was established by the Ohio Anti-Slavery Society. James G. Birney was its editor. A mob attacked the newspaper office on July 30, 1836. Robinson escaped and rode horseback with the forms for the paper, which he had published in Wilmington, Delaware. Birney and Robinson returned to the office in Cincinnati after a few days with no further threats or violence.

Robinson was a Presbyterian minister. An abolitionist, he lectured about slavery, emancipation, and theological subjects from 1830 to 1865. He spoke at the American Anti-Slavery Society in Ohio. Emily remained in Cincinnati and taught while Robinson worked the lecture circuit. When pro-slavery mobs descended on the abolitionists, women were often successful in curbing the violence by putting themselves between the mob and the intended target. Mrs. Garretson stepped in to aid Robinson when he was being attacked in Berlin, Trumbull County, Ohio in June 1837. Mrs. Garretson was attacked and injured. The mob then sliced Robinson's leg, beat him, and tarred and feathered him. Although he was taken 10 miles (16 km) out of town, Robinson was able to get a suit of clothes to wear and walked back to Berlin, where he delivered his speech. Left ill, Robinson recuperated at home for around a month before returning to the lecture circuit. His voice gave out and poor health kept him bed-ridden for months. Pro-slavery factions were dangerous for outspoken abolitionists, as Robinson noted following the death of Elijah Parish Lovejoy (died November 7, 1837), "I fear we are not yet at the worst in our conflict with slavery. Blood I fear must yet flow and persecution more bitter and rancorous succeed..." For ten years, he lived on a farm in Putnam, Ohio.

The anti-slavery movement gained momentum in Ohio during the 1840s. In 1850, he became the president of the Western Antislavery Society, which was centered in Salem, Ohio, and had members from Ohio, southern Michigan, Indiana, and western Pennsylvania. On May 24, 1851, he became the publisher of the society's successful newspaper, The Anti-Slavery Bugle, which operated out of Salem, Ohio. Robinson supported the positions of the eastern radical group of abolitionists, including William Lloyd Garrison, Wendell Phillips, and Edmund Quincy, and adopted the slogan "No Union with Slaveholders". He also supported women's rights and temperance and was against war and capital punishment. His wife Emily, one of the earliest antislavery feminists, became the agent for the paper until 1854, resigning following the death of their daughter Cornelia. He attended and reported on the national disunion convention held in Cleveland on October 28, 1857, which had been called for by Garrison's newspaper The Liberator. He retired from the paper in February 1859. He operated a hat store in Salem and later was president of the Ohio Mutual Fire Insurance Company. He was an active fund-raiser and speaker during the American Civil War. Emily continued her reform work after the war.

Robinson was an Underground Railroad agent, helping people escape slavery. He was affiliated with the American Colonization Society.

== Personal life ==
He married Emily Rakestraw, an abolitionist who defied her parents and went to Cincinnati to teach African Americans. They were married at Delphi, Ohio, near Cincinnati, on November 19, 1836. They had a short courtship, and the Quaker Rakestraw family was concerned that Robinson was not a member of the Society of Friends. Robinson had not met Emily's family prior to the marriage. The Robinsons were shunned by Emily's family. Robinson gave an anti-slavery lecture in New Garden, Ohio, Emily's hometown and her parents warmed up to her new husband after hearing him speak.

He died in Salem, Ohio on December 9, 1878. (Nye stated that he died in 1870.) Emily died on July 20, 1897, at the age of 86.

Marius Racine Robinson's papers are held at the Western Reserve Historical Society. Emily wrote Our Old Anti-Slavery Tent after Susan B. Anthony requested that she record her memories.

== Bibliography ==
- Nye, Russel B. (1946). "Marius Robinson, a Forgotten Abolitionist". Ohio State Archaeological and Historical Quarterly – via Ohio History Connection.
- Robertson, Stacey M. (2010). Hearts Beating for Liberty: Women Abolitionists in the Old Northwest. Univ of North Carolina Press. ISBN 978-0-8078-3408-4.
