= Washington Peak =

Washington Peak can refer to the following mountains in the United States:

- Washington Peak (Alaska)
- Washington Peak (California) in Del Norte County
- Washington Peak (Idaho) in Custer County
- Washington Peak (Washington) in Chelan County

== See also ==
- Mount Washington (disambiguation)
