= Robert B. Wood =

- Born: c. 1836; New Garden, Ohio, US
- Died: July 1, 1878 (aged 41–42)
- Military career
- Allegiance: United States
- Branch: United States Navy
- Rank: Coxswain
- Units: USS Minnesota; USS Mount Washington
- Conflicts: American Civil War: Battle of Suffolk (Norfleet House)
- Awards: Medal of Honor

Robert B. Wood (c. 1836 – July 1, 1878) was a Union Navy sailor in the American Civil War and a recipient of the U.S. military's highest decoration, the Medal of Honor, for his actions at the Battle of Suffolk.

Born in about 1836 in New Garden, Ohio, Wood was still living in that city when he joined the Navy. He served during the Civil War as a coxswain on the USS Minnesota. During the Battle of Suffolk on April 14, 1863, he was temporarily assigned to the USS Mount Washington as it conducted operations on the Nansemond River in Virginia. For this action, he was awarded the Medal of Honor three months later, on July 10, 1863.

Wood's official Medal of Honor citation reads:

Attached to the U.S.S. Minnesota and temporarily serving on the U.S.S. Mount Washington, during action against the enemy in the Nansemond River, 14 April 1863. When the U.S.S. Mount Washington drifted against the bank and all men were driven from the decks by escaping steam following several successive hits which struck her boilers and stopped her engines, Wood boarded the stricken vessel and, despite a strike on the head by a spent ball, continued at his gun for 6 hours as fierce artillery and musketry continued to rake her decks.
