= Henry Thielberg =

- Born: c. 1833; Germany
- Military career
- Allegiance: United States
- Branch: United States Navy
- Rank: Seaman
- Unit: USS Minnesota
- Conflicts: American Civil War • Battle of Suffolk (Norfleet House)
- Awards: Medal of Honor

Henry Thielberg (c. 1833–?) was a Union Navy sailor in the American Civil War who received the U.S. military's highest decoration, the Medal of Honor, for his actions at the Battle of Suffolk.

Born in about 1833 in Germany, Thielberg gave Dudley, Massachusetts, as his home of record when he joined the Navy. He served during the Civil War as a seaman on USS Minnesota. At the Battle of Suffolk on April 14, 1863, he was temporarily assigned to USS Mount Washington as it conducted operations on the Nansemond River in Virginia. Thielberg voluntarily exposed himself to heavy fire in order to surveil the Confederate forces. For this action, he was awarded the Medal of Honor three months later on July 10, 1863.

Thielberg's official Medal of Honor citation reads:

Serving temporarily on board the U.S.S. Mount Washington during the Nansemond River action, 14 April 1863. After assisting in hauling up and raising the flagstaff, Thielberg volunteered to go up on the pilothouse and observe the movements of the enemy and although 3 shells struck within a few inches of his head, remained at his post until ordered to descend.
