= John J. Peck =

American Civil War general (1821–1878)

John James Peck
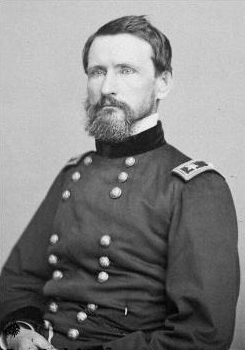
- John J. Peck
- Born: January 4, 1821; Manlius, New York
- Died: April 21, 1878 (aged 57); Syracuse, New York
- Burial place: Oakwood Cemetery, Syracuse, New York
- Military career
- Allegiance: United States
- Branch: United States Army; Union Army
- Service years: 1843–1853, 1861–1865
- Rank: Major General
- Commands: Army of North Carolina
- Conflicts: Mexican–American War; Battle of Palo Alto; Battle of Resaca de la Palma; Battle of Monterrey; Siege of Veracruz; Battle of Contreras; Battle of Churubusco; Battle for Mexico City; American Civil War; Siege of Yorktown; Battle of Williamsburg; Battle of Seven Pines; Seven Days Battles; Siege of Suffolk

John James Peck (January 4, 1821 – April 21, 1878) was a United States soldier who fought in the Mexican–American War and American Civil War.

== Early life ==
Peck was born on January 4, 1821, in Manlius, New York. His father, John W. Peck, who had served in the War of 1812, was among the earliest and most active settlers of Onondaga County. The family home was at 312 Seneca Street, Manlius and is one of the oldest residences in Manlius village, having been built by Finley McLaren prior to 1807. Today the home is marked by a New York State Education Department historic marker commemorating it as the birthplace of Gen. John J. Peck. His mother was Phebe Peck.

Peck entered the United States Military Academy at age 18 and graduated eighth from a class of 39 on July 1, 1843, along with Ulysses S. Grant and many other soon to be famous military officers. He served in the artillery as a second lieutenant and was stationed in New York until 1845.

== Mexican–American War ==
In 1846 he was promoted second lieutenant and fought in Zachary Taylor's Army of Occupation during the battles of Palo Alto, Resaca de la Palma and Monterrey. He then joined Winfield Scott's army and landed at Vera Cruz and fought in all the battles of Scott's campaign culminating in the fall of Mexico City. He was brevetted captain for gallantry and meritorious conduct in the battles of Contreras and Churubusco and again brevetted to major for his services at the battle of Molino del Rey and received the praise of his division commander, William J. Worth. Prior to the outbreak of the Civil War he was said to have been an intimate friend of Generals Robert E. Lee, Joseph E. Johnston and P. G. T. Beauregard.

Returning to the U.S. after the war he served in the quartermasters department and against the Apache Indians on the frontier. Peck resigned from the army on March 1, 1853, and became the treasurer of a railroad project from New York to Syracuse, New York. In 1856 he stood as the Democratic candidate for Congress in the Onondaga district. At the time of Peck's reenlistment and appointment as brigadier general he held the position of cashier at the Burnett Bank of Syracuse of which he was one of the founding members. Peck also served as president of the Syracuse board of education, which position he continued to hold while on active service and only resigned in 1862.

== Civil War ==
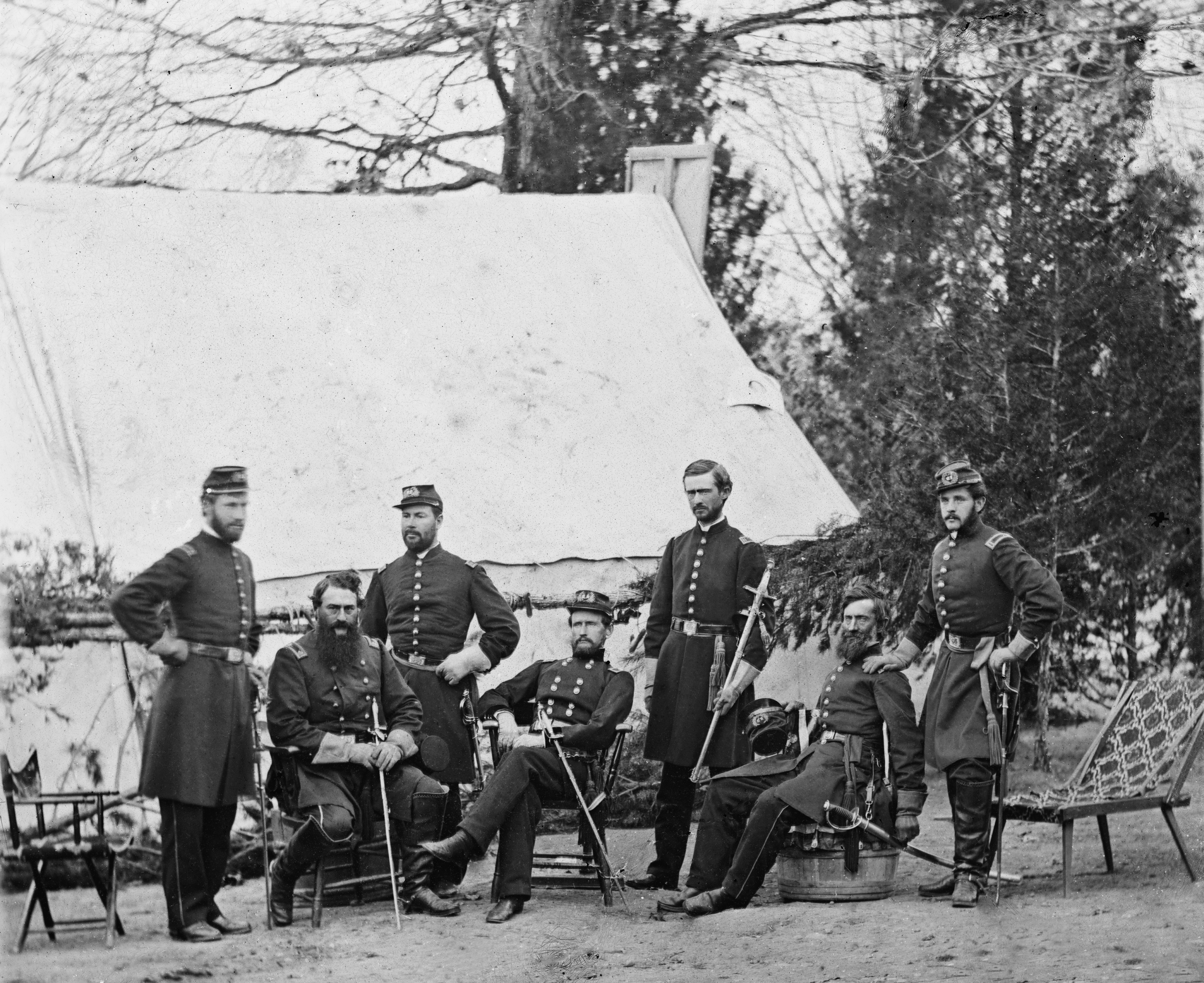
Peck & Staff, Tennallytown, DC, 1862. From left to right: Lieutenant Daniel Lodor Jr., Aide de Camp; Major T. Rush Spence, Brigade Surgeon; Captain Green, Brigade Commissary; General John J. Peck; Captain William H. Morris, Assistant Adjutant Surgeon; Captain Silas Titus, Brigade Quarter Master (later Colonel of the 122nd NY Onondaga Regiment); Lieutenant Charles R. Sterling, Aide-de-Camp.

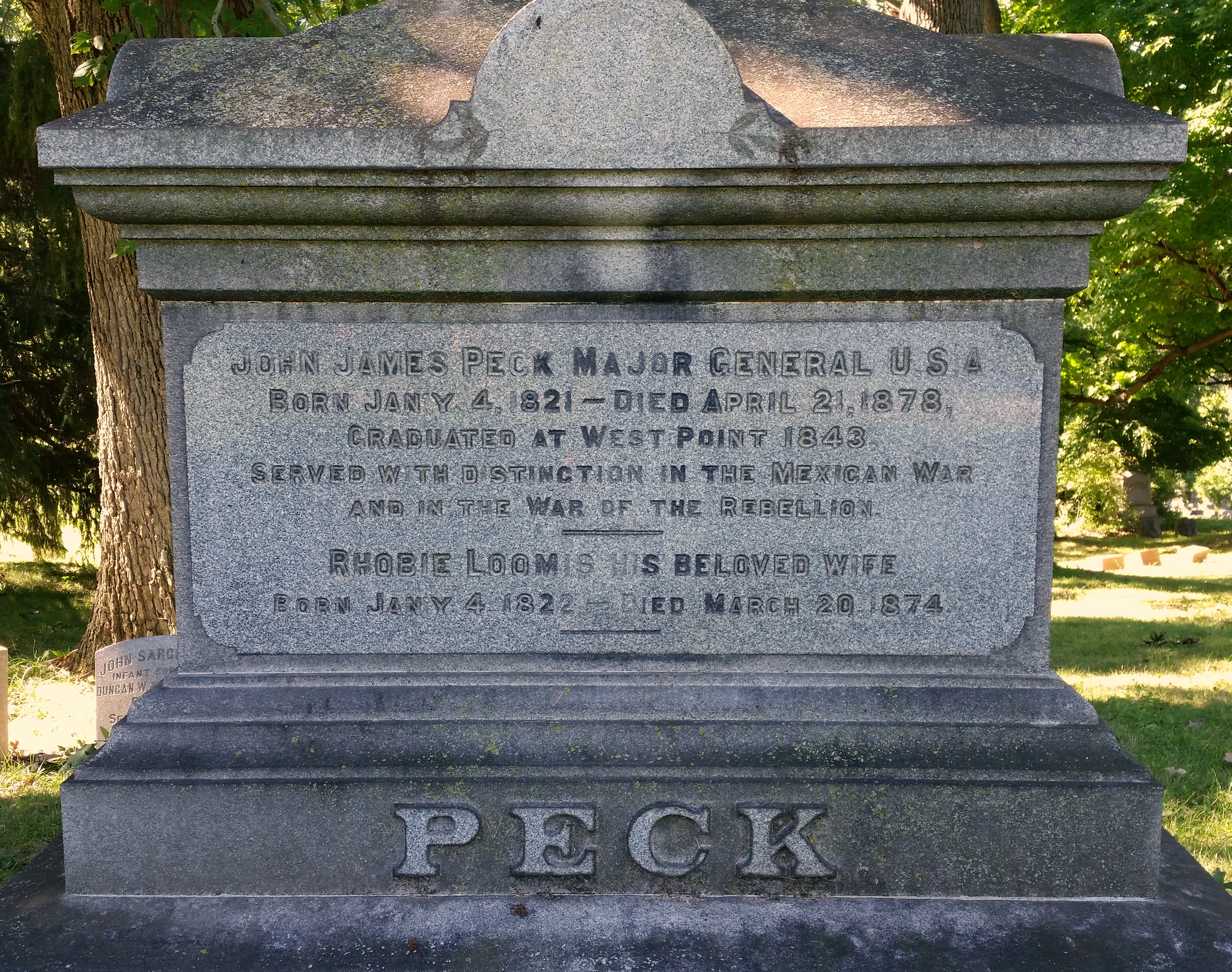
Gravestone of Major General John James Peck, Oakwood Cemetery, Syracuse, New York

=== The Peninsula campaign ===
The outbreak of the Civil War brought Peck back into the army. He accepted a commission as brigadier general of volunteers on August 9, 1861. He was given command of a brigade defending Chain Bridge and the Northern defenses of Washington at Tennallytown and soon after joined George B. McClellan's Army of the Potomac in Virginia. He commanded the 3rd Brigade, (55th NY, 62d NY, 93d Pa, 98th Pa & 102Pa) Couch's 1st Division, Keyes' IV Corps during the Peninsula campaign. He served in the siege of Yorktown, and distinguished himself in the battles of Williamsburg and Fair Oaks. He was placed in command of the 2nd Division, IV Corps during the Seven Days Battles where he again distinguished himself. On July 25, 1862, he was promoted to major general of volunteers to rank from July 4, 1862, for his services in the Battle of Malvern Hill.

=== Suffolk ===
When McClellan's forces began evacuating the peninsula, Peck was left in command of a Union garrison stationed at Yorktown. In September he was given command of all Union troops in Virginia south of the James River.

In 1863 during James Longstreet's Tidewater campaign the attention of both armies in southern Virginia turned to the city of Suffolk. Suffolk guarded the western land approaches to the naval yards at Portsmouth and Norfolk which were in Union control. Peck took command of a force designated the Suffolk Detachment, VII Corps. Peck and his staff maintained Union Army staff headquarters at the Riddick House. This force would eventually amount to three divisions commanded by Michael Corcoran, George W. Getty and George H. Gordon. Peck received a captured message informing him of the Confederate intentions against Suffolk with enough time to take appropriate measures. Longstreet's besiegers gained some initial advantages during the siege of Suffolk at the battle of Norfleet House cutting off the Union supply route. Yet Peck mounted a counter offensive and retook the lost positions in the battle of Hill's Point. The Confederates lifted the siege, and Longstreet's corps returned to northern Virginia for the upcoming Gettysburg campaign. Peck received the praise of his superior, General John A. Dix for his competent defense of Suffolk.

In the summer following the siege of Suffolk, Peck was transferred to command the District of North Carolina where he was involved in little action. For health reasons he went on sick leave. At the request of General Dix, he returned to command the Canadian frontier for the remainder of the war. His Chief of Staff was Colonel John Watts de Peyster Jr., son of a prominent New York family.

== Post-war career ==
After the close of the war, Peck returned to Syracuse where he became president of the New York State Life Insurance Company. His health deteriorating, he died on April 21, 1878, at his home in Syracuse.

== See also ==
- List of American Civil War generals (Union)

== Bibliography Notes ==
- Eicher, John H., and David J. Eicher, Civil War High Commands. Stanford: Stanford University Press, 2001. ISBN 978-0-8047-3641-1.
- John J. Peck
- Peck, John J.; Pourade, Richard F. (1970). The Sign of the Eagle; A View of Mexico, 1830 to 1855. Union-Tribune Publishing Co. ISBN 978-0913938102. OCLC 97186.
