= USS Lamson (DD-328) =

Clemson-class destroyer

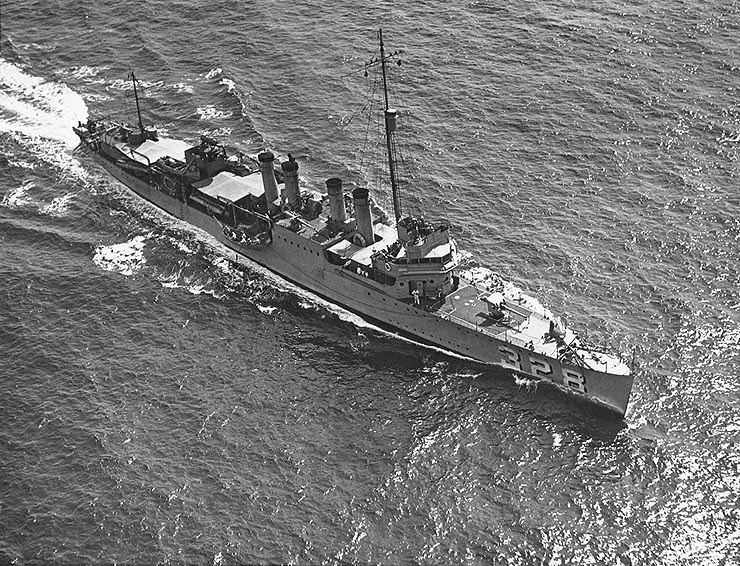
- USS Lamson, 1927

History

United States
- Namesake: Roswell Lamson
- Builder: Bethlehem Shipbuilding Corporation, Union Iron Works, San Francisco
- Laid down: 13 August 1919
- Launched: 1 September 1920
- Commissioned: 19 April 1921
- Decommissioned: 1 May 1930
- Stricken: 22 October 1930
- Fate: Sold for scrapping, 17 January 1931

General characteristics
- Class & type: Clemson-class destroyer
- Displacement: 1,290 long tons (1,311 t) (standard); 1,389 long tons (1,411 t) (deep load)
- Length: 314 ft 4 in (95.8 m)
- Beam: 30 ft 11 in (9.42 m)
- Draught: 10 ft 3 in (3.1 m)
- Installed power: 27,000 shp (20,000 kW); 4 water-tube boilers
- Propulsion: 2 shafts, 2 steam turbines
- Speed: 35 knots (65 km/h; 40 mph) (design)
- Range: 2,500 nautical miles (4,600 km; 2,900 mi) at 20 knots (37 km/h; 23 mph) (design)
- Complement: 6 officers, 108 enlisted men
- Armament: 4 × single 4-inch (102 mm) guns; 2 × single 1-pounder AA guns or; 2 × single 3-inch (76 mm) guns; 4 × triple 21 inch (533 mm) torpedo tubes; 2 × depth charge rails

USS Lamson (DD-328) was a Clemson-class destroyer built for the United States Navy during World War I.

== Description ==
The Clemson class was a repeat of the preceding Wickes class although more fuel capacity was added. The ships displaced 1,290 long tons (1,311 t) at standard load and 1,389 long tons (1,411 t) at deep load. They had an overall length of 314 feet 4 inches (95.8 m), a beam of 30 feet 11 inches (9.4 m) and a draught of 10 feet 3 inches (3.1 m). They had a crew of 6 officers and 108 enlisted men.

Performance differed radically between the ships of the class, often due to poor workmanship. The Clemson class was powered by two steam turbines, each driving one propeller shaft, using steam provided by four water-tube boilers. The turbines were designed to produce a total of 27,000 shaft horsepower (20,000 kW) intended to reach a speed of 35 knots (65 km/h; 40 mph). The ships carried a maximum of 371 long tons (377 t) of fuel oil which was intended gave them a range of 2,500 nautical miles (4,600 km; 2,900 mi) at 20 knots (37 km/h; 23 mph).

The ships were armed with four 4-inch (102 mm) guns in single mounts and were fitted with two 1-pounder guns for anti-aircraft defense. In many ships a shortage of 1-pounders caused them to be replaced by 3-inch (76 mm) guns. Their primary weapon, though, was their torpedo battery of a dozen 21 inch (533 mm) torpedo tubes in four triple mounts. They also carried a pair of depth charge rails. A "Y-gun" depth charge thrower was added to many ships.

== Construction and career ==
Lamson, named for American Civil War naval hero Roswell Lamson, was laid down 13 August 1919 by Bethlehem Shipbuilding Corporation, San Francisco, California; launched 1 September 1920; sponsored by Miss Annette Rolph; and commissioned 19 April 1921.

After shakedown, Lamson was assigned to the Atlantic Fleet, arriving Charleston, South Carolina, 28 December 1921. From 1921 to 1925, the destroyer operated along the east coast and in the Caribbean, participating in fleet maneuvers, war games, and reserve training cruises.

Assigned to the U.S. Naval Forces in Europe, Lamson departed Boston, Massachusetts 18 June 1925 for operations in European and Mediterranean waters. Returning to the United States 1 year later, Lamson rejoined the Scouting Fleet and resumed exercises and maneuvers along the Atlantic coast and in the Caribbean.

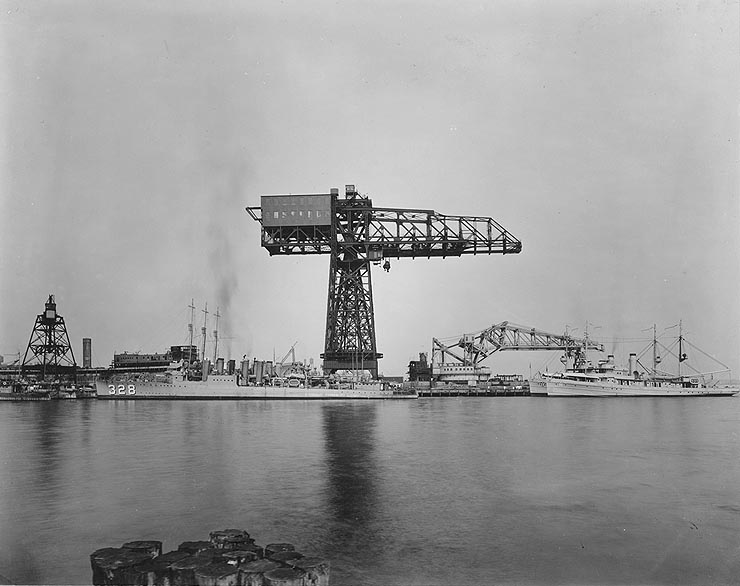
USS Lamson moored near the "League Island Crane" at the Philadelphia Naval Shipyard

== Fate ==
The destroyer continued these operations until she decommissioned at Philadelphia 1 May 1930. Lamson was sold 17 January 1931 to Boston Iron & Metal Company, Baltimore, and scrapped 18 October 1934.
