= Samuel Woods (Medal of Honor) =

American sailor in the Union Navy and recipient of the Medal of Honor

Samuel Woods (c. 1838 - May 23, 1893) was an American sailor in the Union Navy and recipient of the Medal of Honor for actions in the American Civil War.

== Biography ==
Woods was from San Francisco, California. He was born in about 1838 but exactly where is unclear, records that say he was born in San Frabcisco ignore that was not the name of the plave until almost a decade after his birth. He served in the navy as a seaman and was serving temporarily aboard the USS Mount Washington. He earned his medal on board the Washington on the Nansemond River on April 14, 1863. He died on May 23, 1893, and is buried in Oak Grove Cemetery, Portsmouth, Virginia.

== Medal of Honor Citation ==
For extraordinary heroism in action while serving as Captain of the gun, serving temporarily on board the USS Mount Washington, during the Nansemond River (Virginia) action, 14 April 1863. When one of his comrades was struck by a bullet and knocked overboard, Seaman Woods fearlessly jumped into the water and swam after him. Before he reached him, the man sank beneath the surface and Woods promptly swam back to the vessel, went to his gun, and fought it to the close of the action. At the close of the battle, he tirelessly cared for the wounded.
