= Roswell Lamson =

Roswell Hawkes Lamson
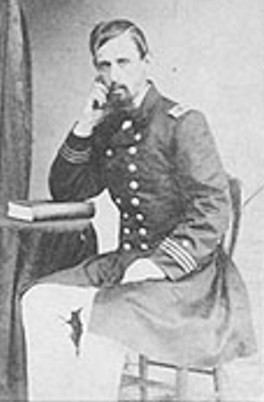
- Born: March 30, 1838; Burlington, Iowa, US
- Died: August 14, 1903 (aged 65); Portland, Oregon, US
- Military career
- Allegiance: United States
- Branch: United States Navy
- Service years: 1858–1866, 1895
- Rank: Lieutenant
- Commands: USS Mount Washington; USS Gettysburg
- Conflicts: American Civil War • First Battle of Fort Fisher • Second Battle of Fort Fisher
- Other work: Clerk of Customs

Roswell Hawkes Lamson (30 March 1838 – 14 August 1903) was an officer in the United States Navy during the American Civil War.

== Biography ==
Born in Burlington, Iowa, Lamson accompanied his natal family as Oregon Trail pioneers of 1847. He was appointed to the United States Naval Academy on 20 September 1858, with the rank of acting-midshipman, the first Oregonian to receive an appointment. After graduating in 1862, completing his training on active duty, he saw action in the Civil War.

Promoted to lieutenant on August 1, 1862, he commanded the gunboat Mount Washington in joint Army-Navy operations on the Nansemond River, and played an important role in the capture of batteries at Hill's Point in April 1863.

On 2 May 1864, at the New York Navy Yard, Lamson commissioned the gunboat Gettysburg, a former blockade runner captured off Wilmington, North Carolina, in November 1863. He spent the next seven months commanding Gettysburg while stationed off the Cape Fear River, as part of the North Atlantic Blockading Squadron, capturing several ships.

Lamson was in the forefront of the attacks on Fort Fisher, which stood at the entrance of the Cape Fear River protecting the approach to Wilmington. In December 1864, an attempt was made to reduce the fort by means of a "powder boat" – in effect a floating bomb. The plan, concocted by General Benjamin F. Butler, called for the steamer Louisiana to be loaded with 215 tons of gunpowder and sailed under the walls of the fort and detonated, destroying the fortifications and stunning the garrison into submission. On the night of December 23/24, the Louisiana, under Commander Alexander Rhind, was towed by Wilderness, commanded by Lamson, to within 300 yards of the fort. Rhind set the fuzes and he and his crew abandoned ship, and were picked up by Wilderness, which promptly sailed for safety. After 80 minutes the ship finally exploded. Unfortunately the tide and an offshore breeze had moved the Louisiana further away from the fort, and the explosion had no effect.

During the second attack, on January 15, 1865, after a preliminary naval bombardment, Lamson led a landing party of sailors and marines from Gettysburg, as part of a naval force assaulting the sea face of Fort Fisher, while the army attacked the landward face. Lamson and his men were pinned down under the ramparts of the fort by enemy fire, spending the night in a ditch. However, the attack by the navy diverted enough of the defenders to make the army assault successful, and the fort was taken. Lamson's friend and fellow officer Samuel W. Preston was killed in the assault.

Lamson resigned from the Navy on July 6, 1866, and returned to Oregon, where he was appointed to be clerk of U.S. Customs. On January 9, 1895, he was reappointed lieutenant and placed on the retired list on April 15, 1895.

Lamson died in Portland, Oregon, on 14 August 1903.

== Namesakes ==
Three U.S. Navy destroyers have been named USS Lamson in his honor.
