= The Anti-Slavery Bugle =

Abolitionist newspaper published in Ohio

The Anti-Slavery Bugle was an abolitionist newspaper published in Ohio from June 20, 1845, to May 4, 1861. The paper's motto was "No Union with Slaveholders".

== History ==
The Anti-Slavery Bugle was first published in New Lisbon, Ohio, (later renamed Lisbon) and moved after five issues to Salem, Ohio. That city was home to many Quaker families and an active station on the Underground Railroad, providing the paper with more subscribers. James Barnaby was the publisher of the paper and received support from the Ohio Anti-Slavery Society, such as Abby Kelley. This allowed the paper to continue to be in circulation for 18 years and was shipped to other states, including Illinois, Iowa, Indiana and Wisconsin.

The paper stated its goal in the first issue: "Our mission is a great and glorious one. It is to preach deliverance to the captive, and the opening of the prison door to them that are bound; to hasten in the day when 'liberty shall be proclaimed throughout all the land, unto all inhabitants thereof." In 1858, it featured the first publication of Frances Harper's abolitionist poem "Bury Me in a Free Land". Later, the paper expanded its mission from anti-slavery topics to include advocacy for the Women's Right Movement. It ran letters and speeches such as Sojourner Truth's "Ain't I a Woman?"

== Notable editors ==
- Marius R. Robinson
- Benjamin S. Jones
- J. Elizabeth Hitchcock
- Oliver Johnson

== See also ==
- African-American newspapers
