= USS Stepping Stones =

Gunboat of the United States Navy

History

United States
- Laid down: date unknown
- Launched: 1861
- Acquired: 30 September 1861
- Commissioned: on or before 21 October 1861
- Decommissioned: 23 June 1865
- Stricken: 1865 (est.)
- Fate: Sold, 12 July 1865

General characteristics
- Displacement: 226 tons
- Length: 100 ft 0 in (30.48 m)
- Beam: 24 ft 0 in (7.32 m)
- Draft: 4 ft 6 in (1.37 m)
- Depth of hold: 8 ft 0 in (2.44 m)
- Propulsion: steam engine; side wheel-propelled
- Speed: 14 knots
- Complement: 21
- Armament: one 12-pounder howitzer

USS Stepping Stones was a steamer purchased by the Union Navy during the early part of the American Civil War.

She was used by the Union Navy first as a dispatch boat, and also as a gunboat assigned to patrol Confederate waterways.

== Built in New York City in 1861 ==
Stepping Stones—a wooden ferryboat built at New York City in 1861—was purchased by the Navy at New York on 30 September 1861, and was commissioned on or before 21 October 1861.

== Civil War operations ==
=== Assigned Potomac River operations ===
The ferryboat departed New York City on 21 October, served briefly at Hampton Roads, Virginia, reached the Washington Navy Yard on 5 November, and was promptly placed in service as a dispatch boat in the Potomac Flotilla. These first few weeks of her service typified her fortunes throughout the Civil War.

Her services were wanted both in the Potomac Flotilla and in the North Atlantic Blockading Squadron for service along the west coast of the Chesapeake Bay and on the rivers—roughly parallel to the Potomac—which drain Tidewater Virginia. As a result, the ferry was shuttled between the two commands as ground operations ebbed and flowed over the Virginia farmlands which separated Washington, D.C., and Virginia.

When assigned to the North Atlantic Blockading Squadron, the ship was moved from the James, to the York, or to the Rappahannock River as demanded by the military situation ashore.

=== Operations on the James River in Virginia ===
Highlights of Stepping Stones' service were the operations on the James in July 1862 to help protect General George B. McClellan's beleaguered army at Harrison's Landing.

During 1863 She was stationed in the Nansemond River and participated in the Siege of Suffolk (VA) undertaken by Longstreet's Corps. One notable event was rescuing, under heavy fire, of USS Mount Washington when that ship had been grounded and disabled during and engagement with an earth works near Suffolk, Virginia. Later, after running the same battery, she made two landings against the earth works; which fell in an assault by Union Army units supported by the Stepping Stones' boat howitzers. Also notable is her participation in a mid-April 1864 Army-Navy expedition up the Nansemond River.

In May 1864, she became part of a torpedo sweeping (mine sweeping) and patrol force on the James.

=== Capturing Confederate blockade runners ===
On 9 November, she captured two blockade-running sloops, Reliance and Little Elmer, in Mobjack Bay.

In March 1865, less than a month before Robert E. Lee surrendered, Stepping Stones was in a naval expedition up Mattox Creek to Colonial Beach, Virginia, where the Union ships attacked a supply base for Confederate guerrillas operating on the peninsula between that river and the Potomac River.

== Post-war decommissioning, sale and subsequent civilian career ==
After the war ended, Stepping Stones was decommissioned at the Washington Navy Yard on 23 June 1865 and was sold on 12 July 1865 to W. D. Wallach. Redocumented as Cambridge on 27 July 1865, the steamer was reduced to a barge on 2 August 1871 and soon disappeared from maritime records.
