= Poems on Miscellaneous Subjects =

1854 poetry collection by Frances Ellen Watkins Harper

Poems on Miscellaneous Subjects is a poetry collection written by Frances Ellen Watkins Harper in 1854. Her non-fiction collection of poems and essays consists of a brief preface followed by a collection of poems and three short writings. Poems on Miscellaneous Subjects sold approximately 12,000 copies in its first four years in print and was reprinted at least twenty times during Harper's lifetime. The work includes several poetic responses to Harriet Beecher Stowe's Uncle Tom's Cabin. Harper's work focuses on the themes Christianity, slavery, and women.

== Background ==
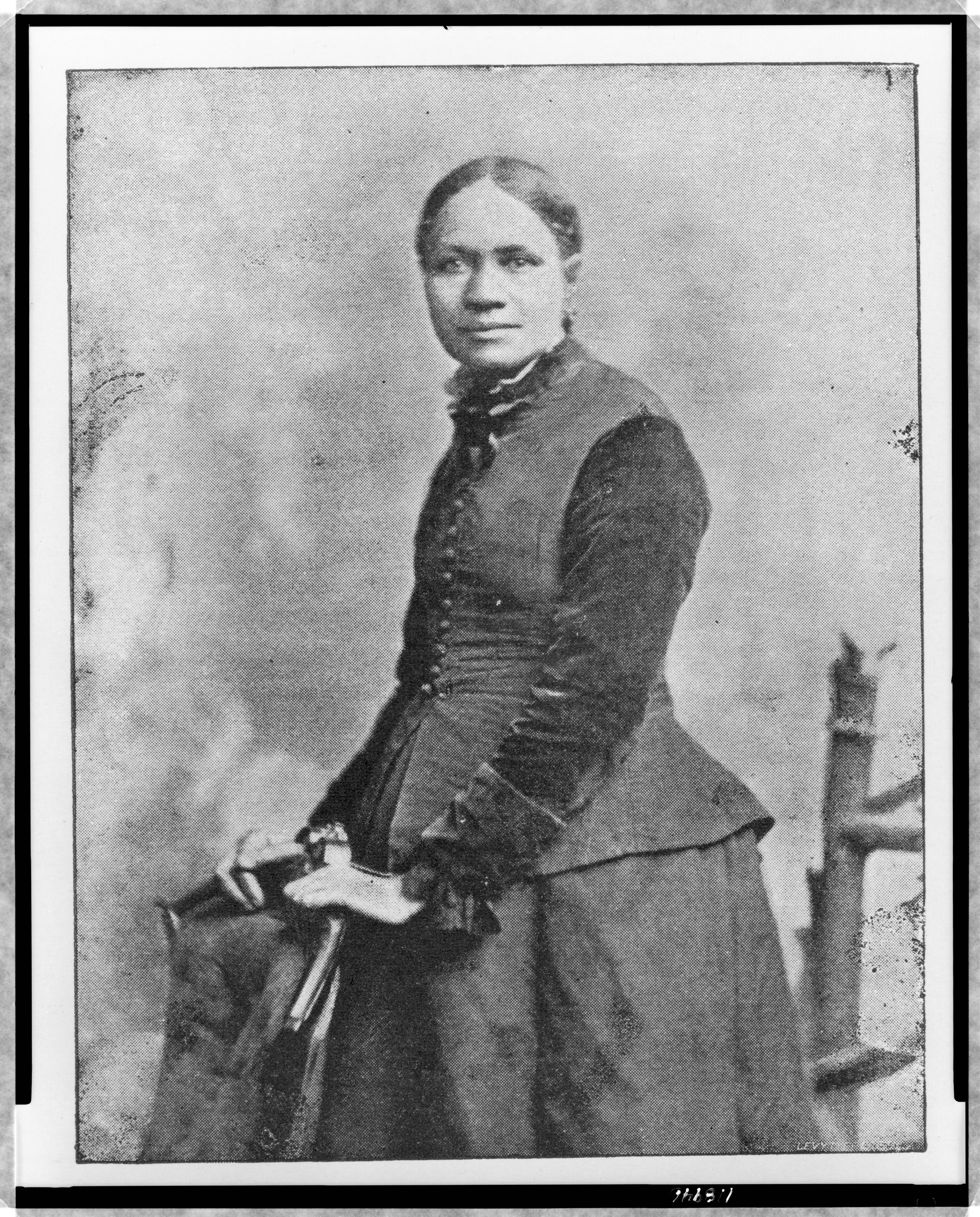
Frances E. W. Harper, author of Poems on Miscellaneous Subjects

Frances E. W. Harper was an American social reformer who authored works that were notable for abolitionism, temperance, and women's suffrage. Harper was the daughter of free black parents, and attended a school that was run by leading abolitionist John Brown. She became dedicated to the abolitionist cause after her home state of Maryland passed a fugitive slave law that allowed free African Americans, such as Harper, to be arrested and sold into slavery.

In August 1854, the same year in which Poems on Miscellaneous Subjects was written, Harper delivered a public address on “Education and the Elevation of the Colored Race”. The success from this address gave her the opportunity to tour for the Anti-Slavery Society, and in addition to her antislavery lecturing, she often pulled from her work Poems on Miscellaneous Subjects. Harper's work became popular with both black and white audiences, and the success of Poems on Miscellaneous Subjects made Harper the most well-known poet of her time.

== Preface ==
The preface to Harper's Poems on Miscellaneous Subjects was written on August 15, 1854. The volume's first edition included a preface signed "W.L.G.", initials that scholars have concluded belong to famed abolitionist William Lloyd Garrison. Harper was an abolitionist and advocate for civil rights, and she championed the value of education in achieving change. This passion for education and change is present in her preface. Harper was noted to have an undying drive to educate both races in order to form a unified and equal society. In her preface, Harper addresses the conditions of chattel slavery and how she believes the condition is causing the extinction of genius for African Americans. Harper's complaint of the extinction of genius does not fall on the blacks alone, but she also draws blame from the whites, a technique of group justice that she used in many of her writings.

== Poems ==
Poems on Miscellaneous Subjects contains 18 poems. Harper's poetry is noted for its simple rhythm, biblical imagery, and storytelling style of oral tradition. The themes present in Poems on Miscellaneous Subjects focus on Christianity, slavery, and women.

=== Christianity ===
Christianity became widespread to African Americans during the transatlantic slave trade. Before coming to America, African religious beliefs and practices were numerous and varied. Some Africans had been exposed to European Christianity before coming to America, so they were able to bring Christian beliefs with them. However, many slaves converted to Christianity in America because they saw conversion as a road to freedom. Harper's upbringing included a religious education, and therefore, the experiences she had during her childhood schooling bring religion forth as a prominent theme in her works in Poems on Miscellaneous Subjects. Such works include “The Syrophoenician Woman ”, “Bible Defence of Slavery ”, “The Drunkard's Child ”, “That Blessed Hope ”, “The Dying Christian ”, “Saved By Faith ”, “The Prodigal's Return ”, and “Eva's Farewell ”.

=== Slavery ===
In Poems on Miscellaneous Subjects, Harper's theme of slavery focuses on the struggles slaves faced such as separation and death. Poems that fit into the theme of slavery are “The Slave Mother ”, “Eliza Harris ”, “The Slave Auction ”, and “The Fugitive's Wife ”. Harper's most notable abolitionist work, "Bury Me in a Free Land", would be published a few years later in 1858.

=== Women ===
Harper's works in Poems on Miscellaneous Subjects also address the subjects of marriage and motherhood. When Harper travelled to the South for the first time, she was abhorred by the poor treatment and severe hardships of thousands of black women. In fact, she asked white women to help support the black liberation movement by reminding white women of their common womanhood to African American women. Harper's dedication to advocating for civil and women's rights make the female and womanhood a basic concern in her poems. Works that fall under this theme include “Report”, “Advice to the Girls”, “A Mother’s Heroism”, and “The Contrast”.

== Short writings ==
Poems on Miscellaneous Subjects also contains three short works. The three works are titled “Christianity”, “The Bible”, and “The Colored People in America”. Harper's works "Christianity" and "The Bible" contain the same biblical imagery seen in many of her texts. The theme of looking for the salvation granted by Christ at the end of one's life is also present in these works. Harper's short writing "The Colored People in America" addresses the harm that the system of slavery is inflicting upon African Americans. Harper had been known to incorporate the theme of slavery leaving a moral stain on the nation, as seen in her other work Forest Leaves. Further, Harper elaborates on the moral stain coming from African American's inability to obtain education, a complaint seen in the preface. However, she ends her work on a positive note by encouraging African Americans to strive until the day freedom comes.
