= New Garden, Ohio =

- Unincorporated community
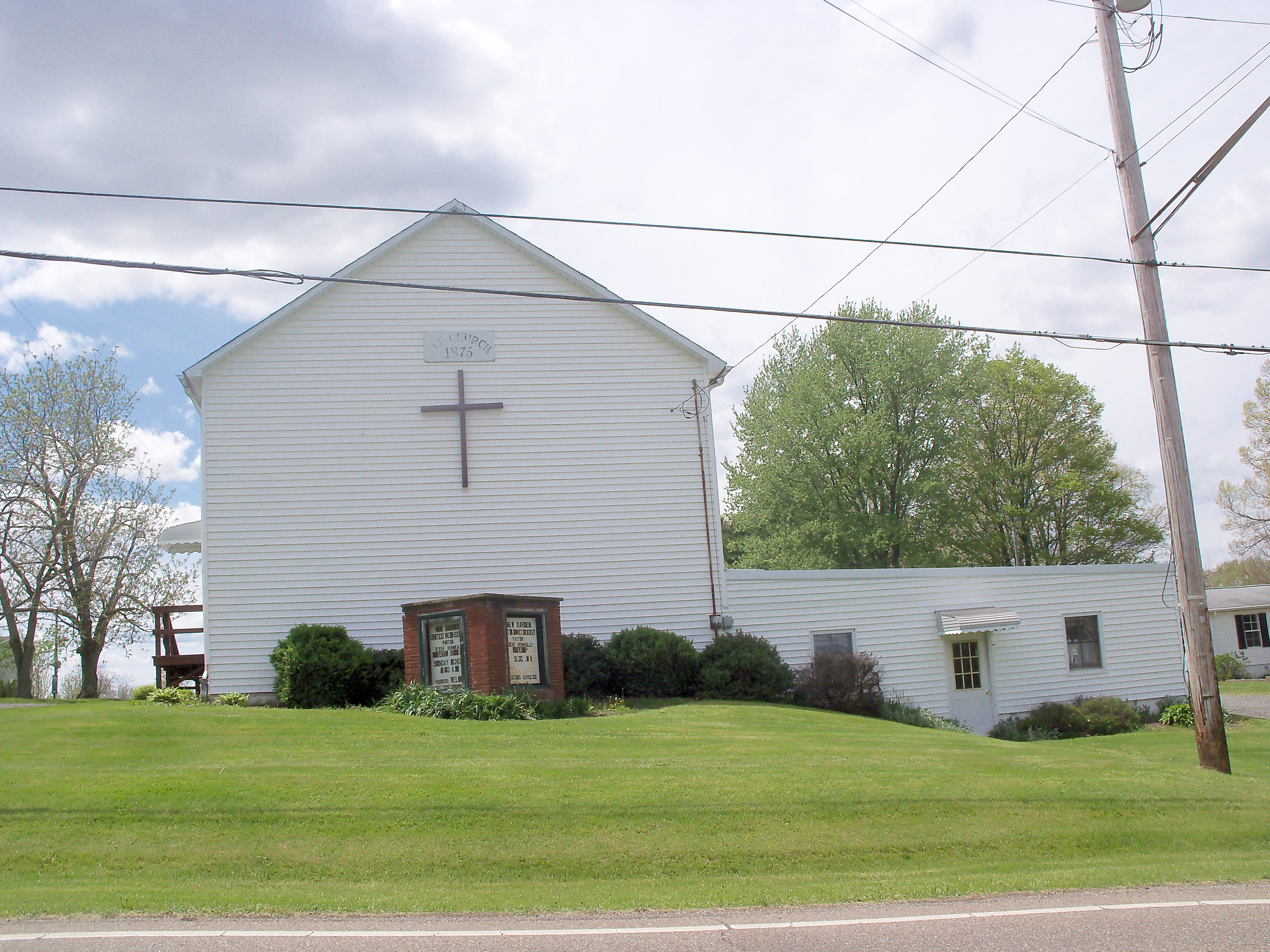
- New Garden United Methodist Church

- Location within Ohio Location within the United States
- Coordinates: 40°47′43″N 80°55′34″W
- Country: United States
- State: Ohio
- County: Columbiana
- Township: Hanover
- Elevation: 1,286 ft (392 m)
- Time zone: UTC-5 (Eastern (EST))
  - Summer (DST): UTC-4 (EDT)
- ZIP code: 44423
- GNIS feature ID: 1057866

New Garden is an unincorporated community in Hanover Township, Columbiana County, Ohio, United States. New Garden is located on Ohio State Route 172, 9 mi (14 km) west of Lisbon.

== History ==
New Garden was laid out in 1810. A post office called New Garden was established in 1830, and remained in operation until 1893.

Quaker missionary Stephen Grellet passed through New Garden in 1824, and wrote in Chapter 66 of his memoirs that he was under "great depression of body and mind", mentioning the "powers of anti-Christ" and that many in the New Garden Quaker community "are among those who are carried away by the spirit of infidelity".

An auxiliary of the American Anti-Slavery Society was formed in New Garden in 1834.

In 1848, African-American abolitionist and author Martin Delany traveled through the community to report on the struggles of free blacks, and wrote of the "'respectable and praiseworthy' black farmers of New Garden, Ohio".

A 28 ft (8.5 m) long covered bridge, built in 1978, is located in Eagle Pass Golf Course in New Garden.

== Recreation ==
Guilford Lake State Park is 2.5 mi (4.0 km) east of New Garden, and Zeppernick Wildlife Area is 3 mi (4.8 km) west.

== Notable person ==
- Robert B. Wood, awarded the Medal of Honor for his actions during the Civil War
