= Eliza Townsend =

American poet

- Born: June 1788; Boston, Massachusetts, U.S.
- Died: January 12, 1854 (aged 65); Boston
- Occupation: poet
- Writing career
- Language: English
- Period: post-American Revolution
- Notable work: "The Incomprehensibility of God"

Eliza Townsend (June 1788 - January 12, 1854) was a 19th-century American poet. Though she wrote mostly anonymously, she was at the end of her life considered the first U.S. woman poet to receive critical acclaim. Nicholas Biddle said that a prize ode Townsend wrote for The Port Folio while he was editor of the magazine was, in his opinion, the finest poem of its kind which at that time had been written in the United States. Many of her other pieces received the best approval of the period, but, as she kept her authorship a secret, it did not enhance her personal reputation. In much of her work, there was a religious and poetical dignity, with all the evidences of a fine and richly-cultivated understanding, which entitled her to be ranked among the distinguished literary women who were her contemporaries.

== Early life and education ==
Eliza Townsend was born in Boston, Massachusetts, June 1788. Her youth was passed in the troubled times which succeeded the American Revolution. She descended from a stock that for two centuries has occupied a distinguished and honorable position in American society.

== Career ==
Townsend sympathized with the feelings which were popular in New England, in regard both to U.S. and to foreign affairs, as was shown by her "Occasional Ode", written in June, 1809, in which Napoleon was denounced with vehemence and power. This poem was first printed in the seventh volume of the Monthly Anthology, and though it bore the marks of hasty composition, in some minute defects, it was altogether a fine piece.

She was a contributor of poems to the Monthly Anthology, the Unitarian Miscellany, and The Port Folio, during the publication of those magazines, and to other periodicals. Her productions were anonymous, and the secret of their authorship was for some time preserved. Among the pieces which she published about this time was "Another Castle in the Air"; "Stanzas commemorative of Charles Brockden Brown"; "Lines on the Burning of the Richmond Theatre"; and a poem to Robert Southey, upon the appearance of his "Curse of Kehama".

At a later period, she published several poems of a more religious nature. These were elevated in tone, and were written in an animated and harmonious style. They were not numerous, and all were of moderate length. Of these, she was best known by "The Incomprehensibility of God". Of this, the Rev. Dr. George Barrell Cheever remarked, that "it is equal in grandeur to the Thanalopsis of Bryant," and that "it will not suffer by comparison with the most sublime pieces of Wordsworth or of Coleridge." Others included "An Occasional Ode", written in June 1809, and published at the time in the Monthly Authology, in which she commented with severity on the career of Napoleon, then at the summit of his career; as well as "Lines to Robert Southey", written in 1812, and "The Rainbow", published in the General Repository and Review.

== Personal life ==
In later life, Townsend did not write for the public in many years. She lived in a secluded manner with her sister, also unmarried, in the old family mansion in Boston. She died at her residence in Boston, January 12, 1854.
