= USS Mount Washington (1846) =

Gunboat of the United States Navy

- Mount Washington as a towboat on the Hudson River after the civil war

History

United States
- Name: Mount Vernon; USS Mount Vernon (1861); USS Mount Washington (1861); Mount Washington (1865)
- Owner: Washington & Fredericksburg SB Co. (1846–??); US Navy (1861–65); Unknown (1865–80)
- Builder: Birely & Son (Kensington, PA}
- Launched: 11 Apr 1846
- Completed: Jul 1846
- Acquired: (by USN): 21 April 1861
- Commissioned: May 1861 – ca. May 1865
- Maiden voyage: 9 Jul 1846
- In service: 1846–80
- Identification: US registry no. 17009
- Fate: Abandoned, 1880

General characteristics
- Tonnage: 359 tons burthen
- Length: 200 ft (61 m)
- Beam: 24 ft (7.3 m)
- Draft: 6 ft 6 in (1.98 m)
- Installed power: Steam engine
- Propulsion: Sidewheels
- Speed: 12 knots
- Armament: one 32-pounder gun

USS Mount Washington was a steamboat purchased by the Union Navy during the American Civil War. She was used by the Union Navy as a gunboat assigned to patrol Confederate waterways.

Mount Washington was originally the commercial passenger-cargo steamer Mount Vernon, built at Philadelphia, Pennsylvania, in 1846. She was seized by order of the War Department 21 April 1861 and transferred to the Navy on that date for active duty with the Potomac Flotilla, Lt. J. Glendy Sprosteon in command.

== Assigned to duty on the Potomac River to protect Washington, D.C. ==
After fitting out at the Washington Navy Yard (striking the wharf in the process), Mount Vernon was ready for duty. In May she reconnoitered the Potomac River and up the Rappahannock River 16 May to Urbana, meeting no southern forces. She chased a steamer 16 May and noted, the 18th, that people on shore were most mistrustful. During the summer, she served as a utility boat. Dispatched 26 June to seize a small sloop convoying armed men from the Maryland to Virginia shores, she departed the Washington Navy Yard 28 June for Fortress Monroe. On 5 July, she towed Teaser, the sloop captured by USS Pocahontas, from Nanjemoy to Washington, D.C. Part of the James River Squadron later in July, she was in Aquia Creek in August, where USS Yankee dispatched her for Freehora. She carried troops to Aiken's Landing 17 August.

== Change of name to USS Mount Washington ==
In this area for the remainder of 1861, Mount Vernon changed her name to Mount Washington 4 November 1861 to prevent confusion. She carried provisions for the squadron in 1862, arriving Norfolk, Virginia, from Washington, D.C., 12 July with ordnance stores. She towed USS Passaic to Hampton Roads, Virginia, 24 December 1862.

== Heavy action encountered in Virginia waterways ==
Mount Washington saw heaviest action in 1863 in the Siege of Suffolk, Virginia. She towed USS Ossipee to Washington 8 January, joining the campaign in April. She found USS Cohasset aground at the mouth of the Nampony River 13 April and learned that the Confederates planned to cross the river to attack the Union's rear forces at Suffolk, Virginia, and to silence the gunboats for this purpose. In the subsequent Battle of Suffolk at the Norfleet House Battery, Mount Washington exchanged artillery fire with the Confederates at Hampton Roads, 14 April, meeting sharp musketry. Four sailors temporarily assigned to Mount Washington were awarded the Medal of Honor for their actions during this battle: Coxswain Robert Jordan, Seaman Henry Thielberg, Coxswain Robert B. Wood, and Seaman Samuel Woods. Later in April, she and Stepping Stones were fired on at Norfleet's Point. Towing West End downriver, Mount Washington ran aground but moved off with the next high tide. Four Negroes boarded her a few days later, reporting no sign of Confederates; nevertheless, Mount Washington was fired on moments later, and a severe engagement ensued.

== Severely damaged, Mount Washington continues her work ==
After this venture, Mount Washington moved to the mouth of the Western Branch, 6 May, where she was completely riddled and disabled. Participating in the naval action against the batteries at Hatt's Point 12 May nearly destroyed her. She towed Sangandon off Jamestown Island 4 June. She joined the North Atlantic Blockading Squadron at Norfolk, Virginia, 25 February 1865.

== End-of-war decommissioning, sale, and civilian career ==
In April, she served as supply ship downriver until decommissioning. She was sold at public auction at Baltimore, Maryland, 21 June 1865. Redocumented 18 October 1865, she continued to serve American commerce until 1880.
