= Frances Ellen Watkins Harper =

African-American author and activist (1825–1911)

Frances Harper
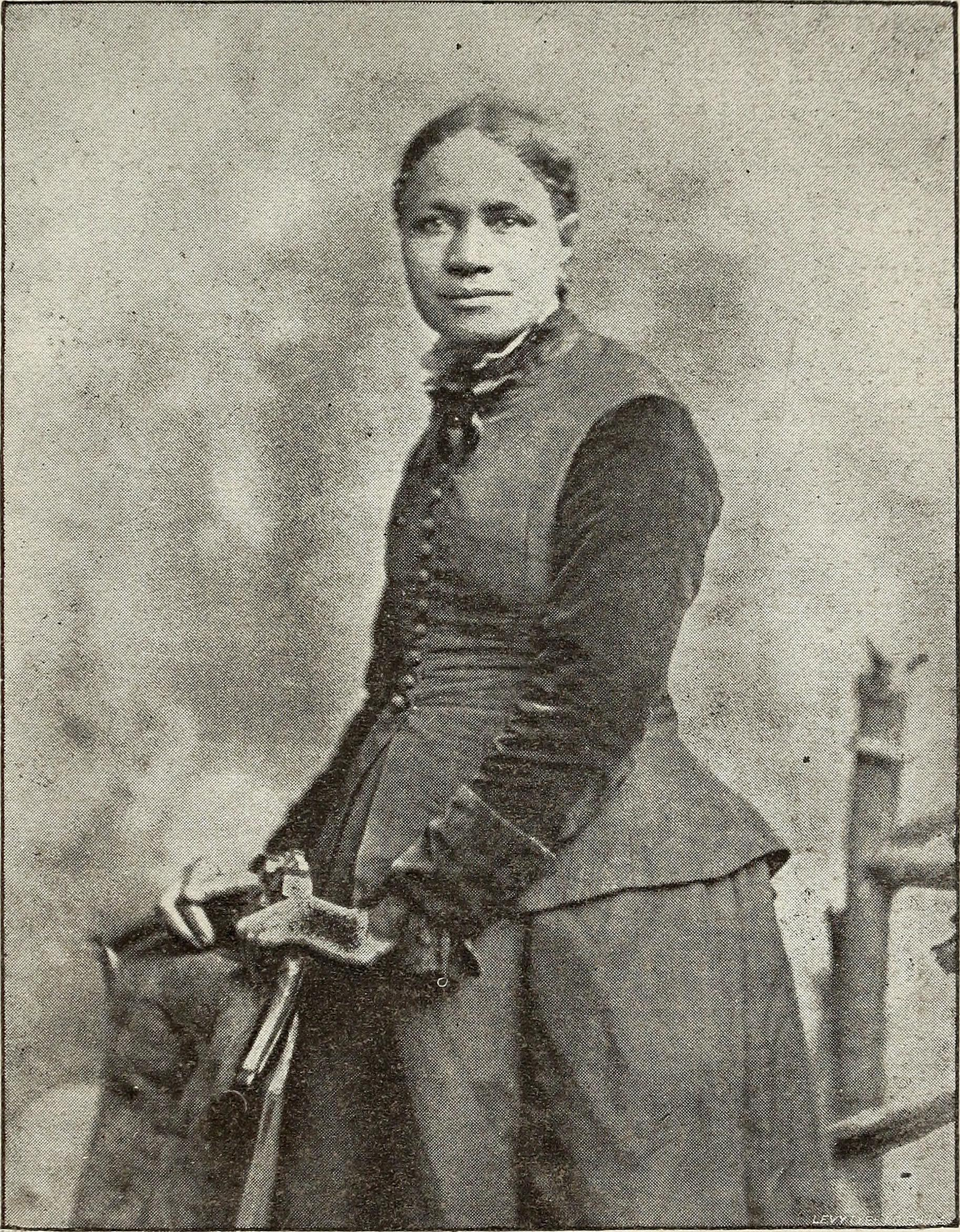
- Harper in 1893
- Born: Frances Ellen Watkins; September 24, 1825; Baltimore, Maryland
- Died: February 22, 1911 (aged 85); Philadelphia, Pennsylvania
- Spouse: Fenton Harper (m. 1860)
- Children: Mary Frances Harper (1862–1908)
- Writing career
- Genres: Poetry, short story, essays
- Notable work: Iola Leroy (1892) Sketches of Southern Life (1872)

Frances Ellen Watkins Harper (September 24, 1825 – February 22, 1911) was an American abolitionist, suffragist, poet, temperance activist, teacher, public speaker, and writer. Beginning in 1845, she was one of the first African American women to be published in the United States.

Born free in Baltimore, Maryland, Harper had a long and prolific career, publishing her first book of poetry at the age of 20. At 67, she published her widely read novel Iola Leroy (1892), placing her among the first Black women to publish a novel.

As a young woman in 1850, Harper taught domestic science at Union Seminary in Columbus, Ohio, a school affiliated with the African Methodist Episcopal Church (AME). In 1851, while living with the family of William Still, a clerk at the Pennsylvania Abolition Society who helped refugee slaves make their way along the Underground Railroad, Harper started to write anti-slavery literature. After joining the American Anti-Slavery Society in 1853, Harper began her career as a public speaker and political activist.

Harper also had a successful literary career. Her collection Poems on Miscellaneous Subjects (1854) was a commercial success, making her the most popular African American poet before Paul Laurence Dunbar. Her short story "Two Offers" was published in the Anglo-African in 1859, making literary history as the first short story published by a Black woman.

Harper founded, supported, and held high office in several national progressive organizations. In 1886, she became superintendent of the Colored Section of the Philadelphia and Pennsylvania Women's Christian Temperance Union. In 1896 she helped found the National Association of Colored Women and served as its vice president.

Harper died at age 85 on February 22, 1911.

== Early life and work ==
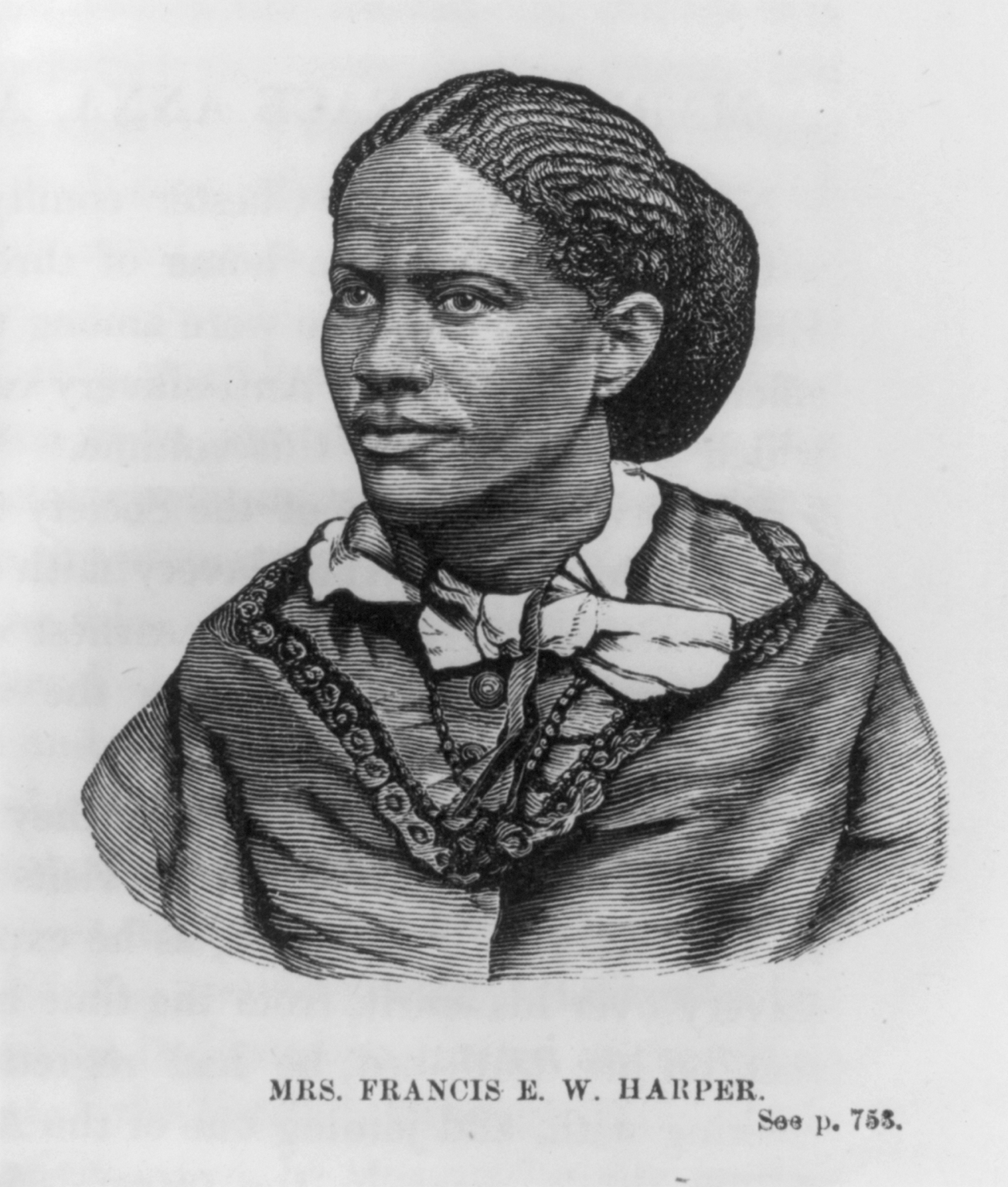
Frances Ellen Watkins Harper, 1872

Frances Ellen Watkins was born free on September 24, 1825 in Baltimore, Maryland (then a slave state), the only child of free parents. Her parents, whose names are unknown, both died in 1828, making Watkins an orphan at the age of three. She was raised by her maternal aunt and uncle, Henrietta and Reverend William J. Watkins, Sr., who gave her their last name.

Frances Watkins's uncle was the minister at the Sharp Street African Methodist Episcopal Church. Watkins was educated at the Watkins Academy for Negro Youth, which her uncle had established in 1820. As a civil rights activist and abolitionist, Reverend Watkins was a major influence on his niece's life and work.

At 13, Watkins became employed as a seamstress and nursemaid for a white family that owned a bookshop. She stopped attending school but used her spare time to read from the books in the shop and work on her own writing.

In 1850, at age 26, Watkins moved from Baltimore to teach domestic science at Union Seminary, an AME-affiliated school for Black students near Columbus, Ohio. She worked as the school's first female teacher. Union closed in 1863 when the AME Church diverted its funds to purchase Wilberforce University, the first Black-owned and operated college. The school in Wilberforce was run by the Reverend John Mifflin Brown, later a bishop in the AME Church. The following year Watkins took a position at a school in York, Pennsylvania.

== Writing career ==
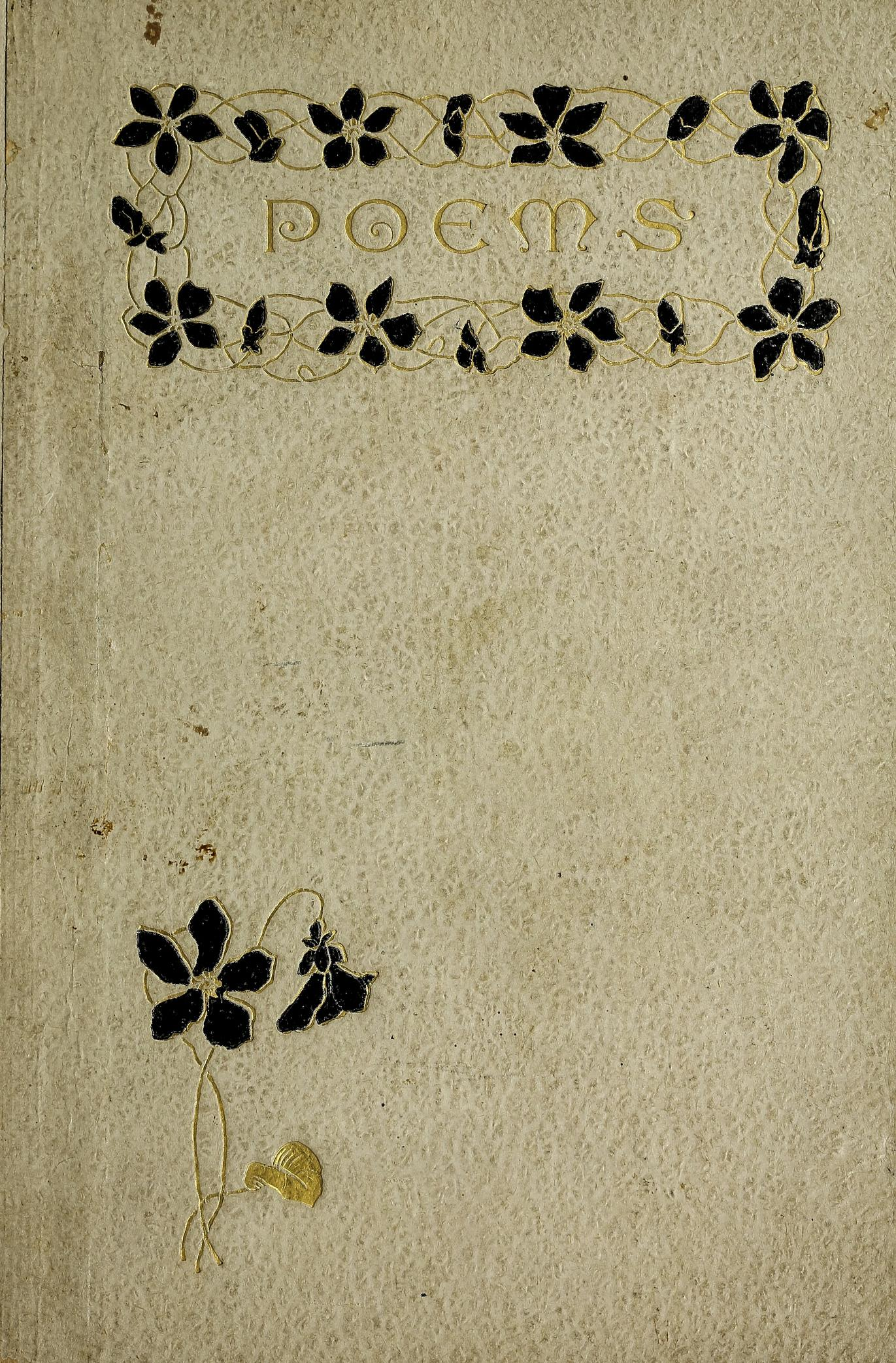
Frances Harper poetry collection, published in 1900

Harper's writing career started in 1839 when she published pieces in antislavery journals. Her politics and writing informed each other. Her writing career started 20 years before she was married, so several of her works were published under her maiden name of Watkins.

Harper published her first volume of verse, Forest Leaves, or Autumn Leaves, in 1845 when she was 20 years old. This book marked her as an important abolitionist voice. A single copy of this volume, long lost, was rediscovered in the early 21st century by scholar Johanna Ortner in Baltimore, at the Maryland Historical Society in the 2010s. Her second book, Poems on Miscellaneous Subjects (1854), was extremely popular. Over the next few years, it was reprinted several times.

In 1858, Harper refused to give up her seat or ride in the "colored" section of a segregated trolley car in Philadelphia (97 years before Rosa Parks). In the same year, she published her poem "Bury Me in a Free Land" in The Anti-Slavery Bugle, which became one of her best known works.

In 1859, Harper's story "The Two Offers" was published in The Anglo-African Newspaper, making her the first Black woman to publish a short story. That same year, Anglo-African Magazine published her essay "Our Greatest Want," in which Harper linked the common religious trope of oppression of African Americans to the oppression of the Hebrew people while enslaved in Egypt. Anglo-African Magazine and the weekly Anglo-African newspaper were both Civil War-era periodicals that served as a forum for debate among abolitionists and scholars.

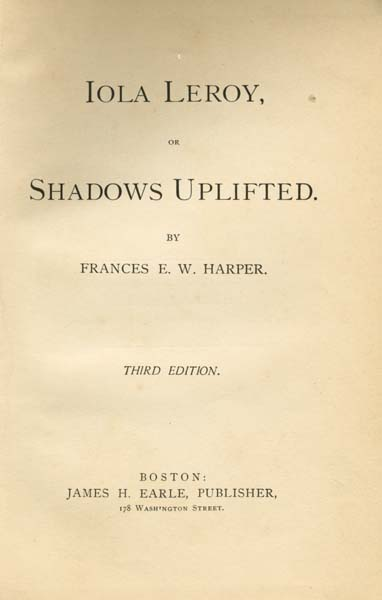
Title page of Iola Leroy or Shadows Uplifted, 1892

Harper published 80 poems. In her poem "The Slave Mother", she writes: "He is not hers, although she bore / For him a mother's pains; / He is not hers, although her blood / Is coursing through his veins! / He is not hers, for cruel hands / May rudely tear apart / The only wreath of household love / That binds her breaking heart." Throughout the two stanzas, Harper demonstrates the restricted relationship between an enslaved mother and her child, while including themes of family, motherhood, humanity and slavery. Another of her poems, "To the Cleveland Union Savers," published in The Anti-Slavery Bugle of Feb. 23, 1861, champions Sara Lucy Bagby, the last person in the United States to be returned to slavery under the Fugitive Slave Law.

Harper published Sketches of Southern Life in 1872. This anthology detailed her experience touring the Southern United States and meeting newly freed Black people. In these poems she described the harsh living conditions faced by a Black woman during both slavery and the Reconstruction era. Harper uses the figure of a former slave, called Aunt Chloe, as a narrator in several of these sketches.

From 1868 to 1888, Harper had three novels serialized in a Christian magazine: Minnie's Sacrifice, Sowing and Reaping, and Trial and Triumph. Harper is also known for what was long considered her first novel, Iola Leroy, or Shadows Uplifted, published as a book in 1892 when she was 67. This was one of the first books published by a Black woman in the United States. While using the conventions of the time, Harper dealt with serious social issues, including education for women, the social passing as white of mixed-race people, miscegenation, abolition, reconstruction, temperance, and social responsibility.

Harper was a friend and mentor to many other African American writers and journalists, including Mary Shadd Cary, Ida B. Wells, Victoria Earle Matthews, and Kate D. Chapman.

== Gendered stereotypes of black womanhood ==
When Harper began giving antislavery lectures, the first of which took place in 1854, her gender attracted attention. The challenges she faced were not limited to racial prejudices, for in those days black women who spoke publicly about racial issues were still few in number and scientific racism was deeply intertwined with scientific sexism. It was taken by some as confirmation of gendered stereotypes about the differences between black women and white women, as in the scientific thinking of the day black women were cast as a Jezebel type, "governed almost entirely by her libido," drawing a stark contrast with the 19th century ideal of sexually pure white femininity.

== Progressive causes ==
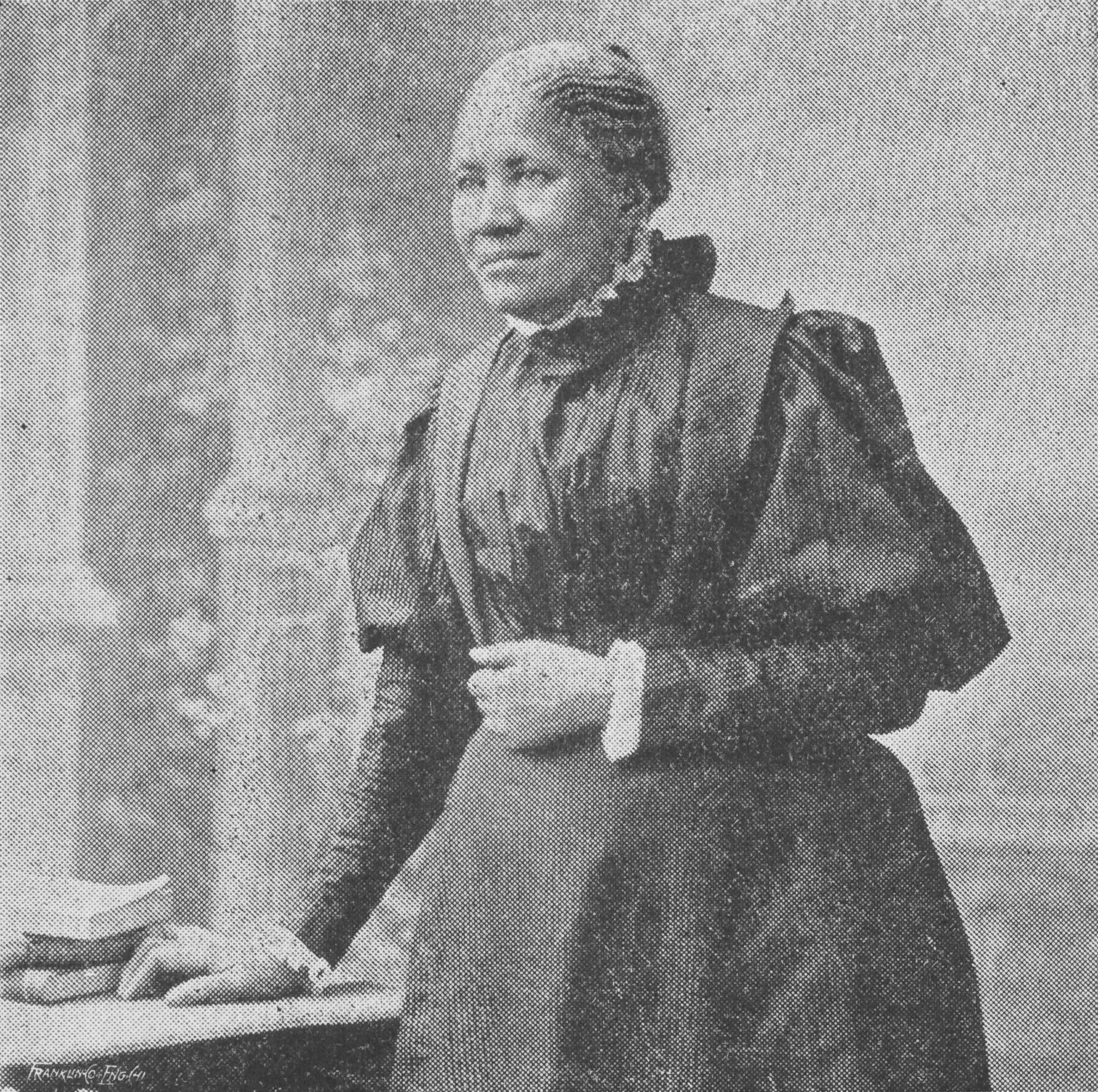
Frances Ellen Watkins Harper, 1902

Frances Ellen Watkins Harper was a strong supporter of abolitionism, prohibition and woman's suffrage, progressive causes that were connected before and after the American Civil War. She was also active in the Unitarian Church, which supported abolitionism. Harper wrote to John Brown after he had been arrested and before his execution: "I thank you that you have been brave enough to reach out your hands to the crushed and blighted of my race; I hope from your sad fate great good may arise to the cause of freedom."

In 1853, Watkins joined the American Anti-Slavery Society and became a traveling lecturer for the group. She delivered many speeches during this time and faced much prejudice and discrimination along the way. In 1854, Watkins delivered her first anti-slavery speech called "The Elevation and Education of Our People." The success of this speech resulted in a lecture tour in Maine for the Anti-Slavery Society. She recalled New England warmly: "Dear old New England! It was there kindness encompassed my path; it was there kind voices made their music in my ear. The home of my childhood, the burial-place of my kindred, is not as dear to me as New England." She continued to travel, lecturing throughout the East, the Midwest, and Canada from 1856 to 1860. Of Pennsylvania's treatment of African American people, Harper stated: "Now let me tell you about Pennsylvania. I have been traveling nearly four years, and have been in every New England State, in New York, Canada, and Ohio; but of all these places, this is about the meanest of all."

After the Civil War ended in 1865, Harper moved South to teach newly freed Black people during the Reconstruction Era. During this time she also gave many large public speeches. In 1870, Harper worked with the Freedmen's Bureau encouraging many freedmen in Mobile, Alabama, to "get land, everyone that can" so they could vote and act independently once Congress passed the Fifteenth Amendment.

Harper was active in the growing number of Black organizations and came to believe that Black reformers had to be able to set their own priorities. From 1883 to 1890, she helped organize events and programs for the National Woman's Christian Temperance Union. She had worked with members of the original WCTU, because "it was the most important women's organization to push for expanding federal power." In her role as superintendent of the Colored Section of the Philadelphia and Pennsylvania WCTU, Harper facilitated both access and independent organizing for Black women, promoting the collective action of all women as a matter of both justice and morality. "Activists like Harper and Frances Willard campaigned not only for racial and sexual equality but also for a new understanding of the federal government's responsibility to protect rights, regulate morality, and promote social welfare". Harper was disappointed, however, when Willard gave priority to white women's concerns, rather than supporting Black women's goals of gaining federal support for an anti-lynching law, defense of Black rights, or abolition of the convict lease system.

Harper's public activism also continued in later years. In 1891, Harper delivered a speech to the National Council of Women of America in Washington D.C., demanding justice and equal protection by the law for the African American people. In her speech, she stated:

"As long as there are such cases as moral irresponsibility, mental imbecility; as long as Potiphar's wife stands in the world's pillory of shame, no man should be deprived of life or liberty without due process of law. A government which has power to tax a man in peace, and draft him in war, should have power to defend his life in the hour of peril. A government which can protect and defend its citizens from wrong and outrage and does not is vicious. A government which would do it and cannot is weak; and where human life is insecure through either weakness or viciousness in the administration of law, there must be a lack of justice, and where this is wanting nothing can make up the deficiency."

== Suffrage activism ==
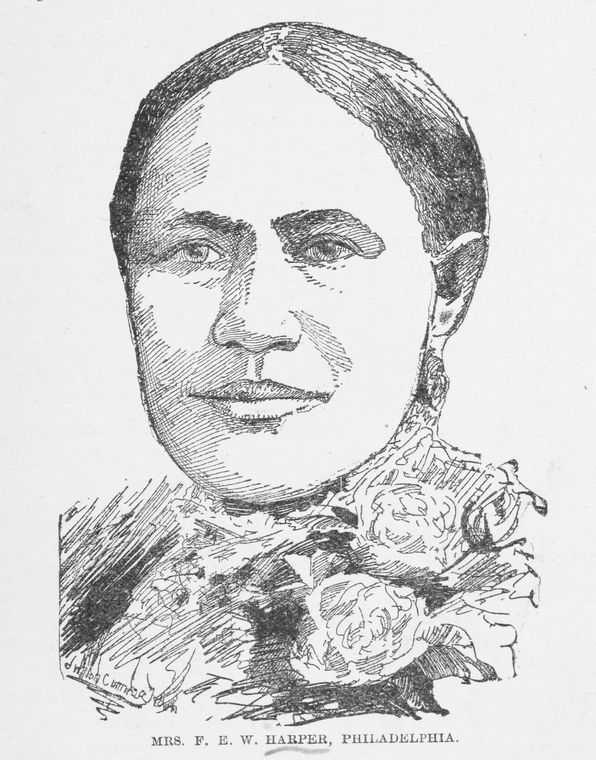
Frances E.W. Harper portrait, 1893

=== Activism techniques ===
Frances Harper's activism took an intersectional approach, which combined her campaign for African American civil rights with her advocacy for women's rights. One of Harper's major concerns regarded the brutal treatment Black women—including Harper herself—encountered on public transportation, and this matter foregrounded her advocacy for women's suffrage. In the 1860s and beyond, Harper delivered various speeches pertaining to women's issues and more specifically, Black women's issues. One of her speeches, "We Are All Bound Up Together," delivered in 1866 at the National Woman's Rights Convention in New York City, demanded equal rights for all, emphasizing the need to raise awareness for African American suffrage while also advocating for women's suffrage. In her speech, she stated:

"We are all bound up together in one great bundle of humanity, and society cannot trample on the weakest and feeblest of its members without receiving the curse in its own soul. You tried that in the case of the Negro...You white women speak here of rights. I speak of wrongs. I, as a colored woman, have had in this country an education which has made me feel as if I were in the situation of Ishmael, my hand against every man, and every man's hand against me...While there exists this brutal element in society which tramples upon the feeble and treads down the weak, I tell you that if there is any class of people who need to be lifted out of their airy nothings and selfishness, it is the white women of America."

After Harper delivered this speech, the National Woman's Rights Convention agreed to form the American Equal Rights Association (AERA), which incorporated African American suffrage into the Women's Suffrage Movement. Harper served as a member of AERA's Finance Committee, though Black women comprised only five of the organization's fifty-plus officers and speakers. AERA was short-lived, ending when Congress proposed the Fifteenth Amendment, which would grant African American men the right to vote. Some of AERA's suffragists, such as Susan B. Anthony and Elizabeth Cady Stanton, did not support the Amendment's aim to enfranchise Black men without extending suffrage rights to women. Harper, on the other hand, supported the Fifteenth Amendment, and endorsed the Amendment at AERA's final meeting. Shortly afterward, AERA divided into two separate movements: the National Woman Suffrage Association (NWSA), which did not support the Amendment, and the American Woman Suffrage Association (AWSA), which supported the Amendment. Neither organization fully promoted the rights of Black women. As a proponent of the Fifteenth Amendment, Harper helped found the AWSA. After all, Harper did not want to undermine the progress of Black men by choosing to fight for women's suffrage over African American suffrage. Harper did, however, support the proposed Sixteenth Amendment, which would have granted women the right to vote. After the passage of the Fifteenth Amendment in 1870, Harper also encouraged formerly enslaved people to vote.

In addition to delivering speeches, Harper also promoted her intersectional suffrage advocacy in later years by helping found the National Association for Colored Women (NACW) in 1896. Harper was often the only Black woman at the progressive conferences she attended, which isolated her from the predominantly white reformers. Harper therefore helped organize the NACW to avoid the racism of white progressives. In 1897, Harper became the NACW's vice president and used her platform to advocate for Black women's civil rights.

=== Suffragism in literature ===
Various examples of Harper's writing contain themes of suffrage. Her poem, "The Deliverance," published in her 1872 anthology, Sketches of Southern Life, discusses the vote through the lens of fictional Black female narratives during the Reconstruction era. As scholar Elizabeth A. Petrino argues, in "The Deliverance," Harper communicates how "women within the home are the catalysts for political rebellion" and likewise "posits women as moral exemplars and centers of political power within the home." Indeed, during her years of activism, Harper expressed concern regarding how individuals would cast their ballots once granted the right to vote. Harper's "The Deliverance" conveys these sentiments through several vignettes telling how different fictional men exercised their right to vote. Harper writes:

"But when John Thomas Reeder brought

His wife some flour and meat,

And told he had sold his vote

For something good to eat,

You ought to seen Aunt Kitty raise,

And heard her blaze away;

She gave the meat and flour a toss,

And said they should not stay.

And I should think he felt quite cheap

For voting the wrong side;

And when Aunt Kitty scolded him,

He just stood up and cried."

In these particular stanzas, the speaker questions how the voting population will exercise their right to vote. As the character John Thomas Reeder "sold his vote" for food, Aunt Kitty expresses her frustration that not all people—and particularly men, in this instance—fully understand the importance of the vote. Not only does Aunt Kitty, the sole female figure in the text, "toss" the meat and flour, but she also scolds Reeder and makes him cry. While Aunt Kitty has agency in her encounter with Reeder, Reeder has a power of his own in possessing the right to vote. Within "The Deliverance," Harper expresses a desire for Black women to obtain suffrage rights alongside their male counterparts.

In addition to "The Deliverance," Harper's poem, "The Fifteenth Amendment," describes in positive terms the Fifteenth Amendment, which granted African-American men the right to vote:

"Ring out! ring out! your sweetest chimes,

Ye bells, that call to praise;

Let every heart with gladness thrill,

And songs of joyful triumph raise.

Shake off the dust, O rising race!

Crowned as a brother and a man;

Justice to-day asserts her claim,

And from thy brow fades out the ban.

With freedom's chrism upon thy head,

Her precious ensign in thy hand,

Go place thy once despised name

Amid the noblest of the land"

In these stanzas, Harper includes exclamation points, alongside imagery such as "chimes" of the bells, and a command for the African American people to "shake off the dust." Harper additionally incorporates positive diction, such as the phrases "gladness thrill" and "joyful triumph." Harper also uses regal language to describe the newly enfranchised population. Upon receiving voting rights, Black men are "crowned" and become "amid the noblest of the land," posing a contrast with their "once despised name" that Harper references. In general, the language in "The Fifteenth Amendment" casts the Fifteenth Amendment in a positive light, which aligns with Harper's previous support for the Amendment that led her to help found the American Woman Suffrage Association. Unlike "The Deliverance," however, Harper's "The Fifteenth Amendment" poem does not express a particular yearning for Black women's suffrage.

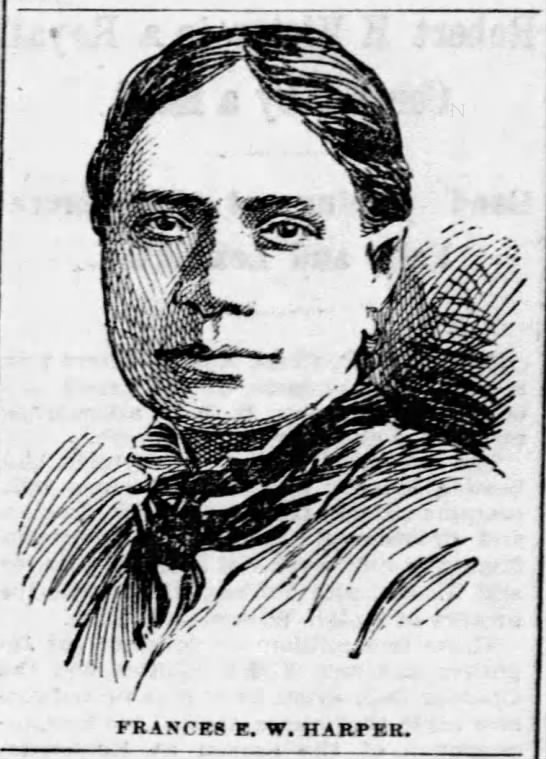
Frances Harper portrait, The Boston Globe, 1894

Alongside her poetry, Harper's prose also presents suffrage activism. Her novel Minnie's Sacrifice, published in 1869—in the same year as the Fifteenth Amendment debates—describes the vote as a defense mechanism for Black women as victims of racial violence in the Reconstruction South.Minnie's Sacrifice also highlights the intersectional struggles faced by Black women. For example, scholar Jen McDaneld argues in her analysis of the novel that the need for protection of the law, which the vote could help Black women obtain, is "rooted in both radicalized and gendered injustices that cannot be extricated from one another." Near the end of the novel, Minnie expresses a desire for Black women's suffrage, contending the right of suffrage should not be based upon "service or sex, but on the common base of humanity." Responding to the male character Louis, who believes the nation is "not prepared for" Black women's suffrage, Minnie states:

"I cannot recognize that the negro man is the only one who has pressing claims at this hour. To-day our government needs woman's conscience as well as man's judgment. And while I would not throw a straw in the way of the colored man, even though I know that he would vote against me as soon as he gets his vote, yet I do think that woman should have some power to defend herself from oppression, and equal laws as if she were a man."

Through Minnie's statement, Harper conveys a desire for Black women to achieve suffrage rights in order to defend themselves from oppression. Shortly after making this claim, Minnie is killed—the result of racial violence. Minnie is not protected by the law, and she is a victim of the oppression she protests against in her pro-suffrage rhetoric. In this excerpt, Minnie also shows support for the Black man's vote, stating how she "would not throw a straw in the way of the colored man." At the same time, though, similar to the speaker in "The Deliverance," Minnie additionally expresses uncertainty regarding how these men might cast their ballots. Within Minnie's Sacrifice, Harper communicates a determination for Black women to obtain the right to suffrage.

=== Scholarship of suffrage ===
There is little scholarship detailing Frances Harper's involvement in the Women's Suffrage Movement. Indeed, Harper does not appear in the History of Woman Suffrage anthology written by Susan B. Anthony and Elizabeth Cady Stanton, who were original members of the NWSA. As scholar Jennifer McDaneld argues, the "suffrage split" that created NWSA and AWSA alienated Harper—who appeared to refuse white feminism—from the Women's Suffrage Movement.

== Personal life ==
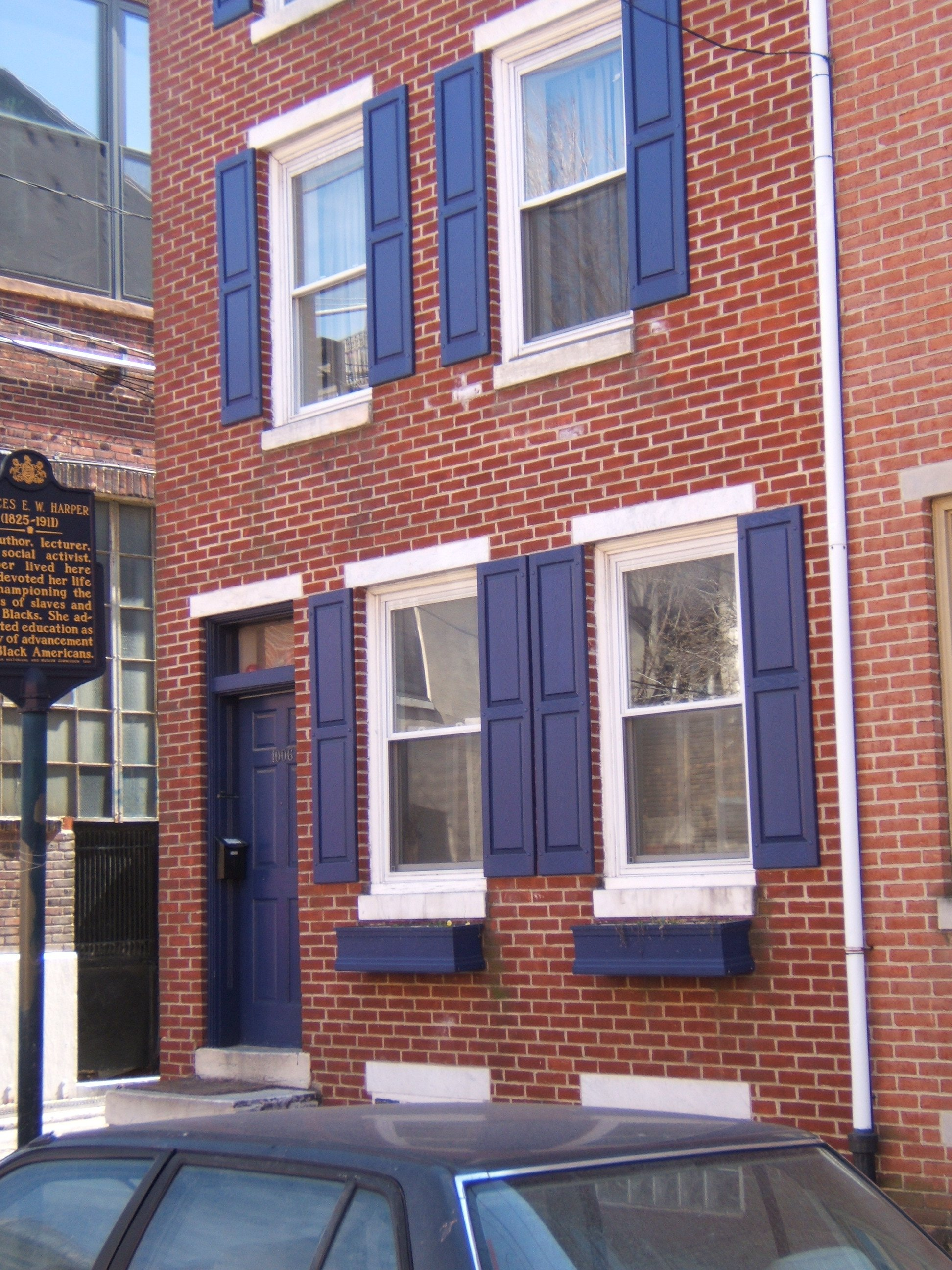
Frances Harper's home at 1006 Bainbridge Street, Philadelphia, built ca. 1870. Harper lived here through her old age until her death in 1911.

In 1860, Frances Watkins married a widower named Fenton Harper. The couple had a daughter together, named Mary Frances Harper, and three other children from Fenton Harper's previous marriage. When Fenton Harper died four years later, Frances Harper kept custody of Mary and moved to the East Coast. The two would continue to live there for the rest of their lives. While on the East Coast, Harper continued to give lectures to support herself.

Frances Ellen Watkins Harper died of heart failure on February 22, 1911, at the age of 85. Her funeral service was held at First Unitarian Church on Chestnut Street in Philadelphia. She was buried in Eden Cemetery in Collingdale, Pennsylvania, next to her daughter, Mary.

== Selected works ==
- Forest Leaves, verse, 1845
- Poems on Miscellaneous Subjects, 1854
- Poems on Miscellaneous Subjects, 1857
- Free Labor, 1857
- The Two Offers, 1859
- Moses: A Story of the Nile, 1869
- Sketches of Southern Life, 1872
- Light Beyond the Darkness, 1890
- The Martyr of Alabama and Other Poems, 1894
- Iola Leroy, or Shadows Uplifted, novel, 1892
- Idylls of the Bible, 1901
- In Memoriam, Wm. McKinley, 1901

In addition, the following three novels were originally published in serial form in the Christian Recorder between 1868 and 1888:

- Minnie's Sacrifice
- Sowing and Reaping
- Trial and Triumph

== Legacy and honors ==
- Numerous African-American women's service clubs are named in her honor. Across the nation, in cities such as St. Louis, St. Paul, and Pittsburgh, F.E.W. Harper Leagues and Frances E. Harper Women's Christian Temperance Unions thrived well into the twentieth century.
- A historical marker was installed to commemorate her by her home at 1006 Bainbridge Street, Philadelphia. (See marker at left side of photo above.)
- A honors dormitory was named for her and Harriet Tubman at Morgan State University in Baltimore, Maryland; it is commonly referred to as Harper-Tubman, or simply Harper.
- An excerpt from her poem "Bury Me in a Free Land" is inscribed on a wall of the Contemplative Court, a space for reflection in the Smithsonian's National Museum of African American History and Culture. The excerpt reads: "I ask no monument, proud and high to arrest the gaze of the passers-by; all that my yearning spirit craves is bury me not in a land of slaves."
- Her poem "Bury Me in a Free Land" was recited in Ava DuVernay's film August 28: A Day in the Life of a People, which debuted at the 2016 opening of the Smithsonian's National Museum of African American History and Culture.
- In 2018 Harper was inducted to the National Abolition Hall of Fame in Peterboro, New York.
