= Bury Me in a Free Land =

1858 poem by Frances Harper

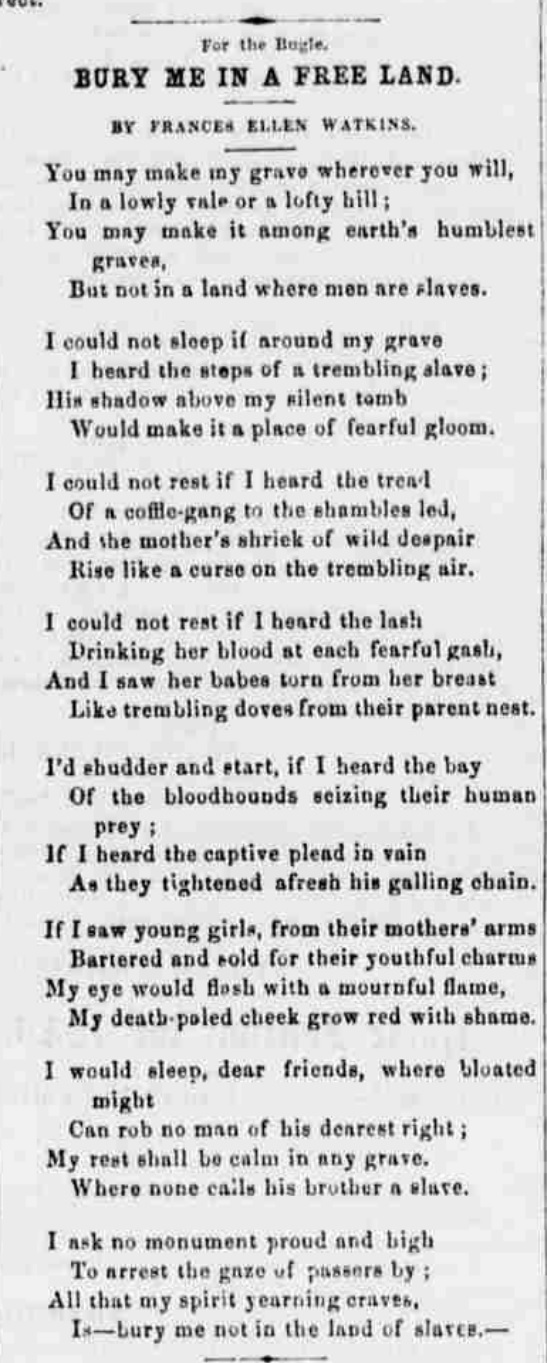
"Bury Me in a Free Land", from The Anti-Slavery Bugle, November 20, 1858

"Bury Me in a Free Land" is a poem by African-American writer and abolitionist Frances Harper, written for The Anti-Slavery Bugle newspaper in 1858.

== Analysis ==
The poem implies that the speaker is dying soon, which lends her request a sense of urgency. The message being presented as a sort of deathbed wish also gives the request stronger moral authority. The use of grave imagery to draw sympathy to the plight of enslaved people was popularized with Harriet Beecher Stowe's popular novel Uncle Tom's Cabin (1852), whose titular character is buried in an unmarked grave. Harper's poem seems to threaten that the narrator will haunt those who survive as she "could not rest" if she was buried in a land where people are enslaved.

== Legacy ==
Harper sent a copy of the poem to the widow of John Brown after his execution for his raid on Harpers Ferry. She also republished the poem after emancipation in the United States in the January 14, 1864, issue of The Liberator.

This poem was recited in the film August 28: A Day in the Life of a People, which debuted at the opening of the Smithsonian's National Museum of African American History and Culture in 2016.

An excerpt from the poem is on a wall of the Contemplative Court, a space for reflection in the Smithsonian's National Museum of African American History and Culture. The excerpt reads: "I ask no monument, proud and high to arrest the gaze of the passers-by; all that my yearning spirit craves is bury me not in a land of slaves."
