= List of peaks named Mount Washington =

There are a number of peaks named Mount Washington:

== United States ==
Name	USGS link	State	County	USGS map	Coordinates
Mount Washington		Arizona	Santa Cruz	Duquesne	31°21′12″N 110°43′29″W
Mount Washington		California	Plumas	Gold Lake	39°43′30″N 120°42′45″W
Mount Washington		Massachusetts	Berkshire	Bash Bish Falls	42°06′45″N 073°29′05″W
Mount Washington		Massachusetts	Middlesex	Boston North	42°24′34″N 071°02′24″W
Mount Washington		New Hampshire	Coos	Mount Washington	44°16′14″N 071°18′17″W
Mount Washington		New Mexico	Bernalillo	Mount Washington	34°57′45″N 106°24′31″W
Mount Washington		Nevada	White Pine	Wheeler Peak	38°54′54″N 114°18′30″W
Mount Washington		New York	Steuben	Hammondsport	42°22′53″N 077°11′14″W
Mount Washington		Oregon	Linn	Mount Washington	44°19′57″N 121°50′14″W
Mount Washington		U.S. Virgin Islands	St. Croix	Frederiksted	17°45′02″N 064°52′38″W
Mount Washington		Washington	Ferry	Edds Mountain	48°35′32″N 118°32′28″W
Mount Washington		Washington	King	Chester Morse Lake	47°25′34″N 121°41′56″W
Mount Washington		Washington	Mason	Mount Washington	47°31′53″N 123°14′41″W
Mount Washington		Washington	Skagit	Stimson Hill	48°18′15″N 122°06′18″W
Mount Washington		Wisconsin	Eau Claire	Eau Claire West	44°47′52″N 091°32′22″W

== Canada ==
- Mount Washington (British Columbia), on Vancouver Island
