= Siege of Suffolk =

Action of the American Civil War

- Part of the eastern theater of the American Civil War
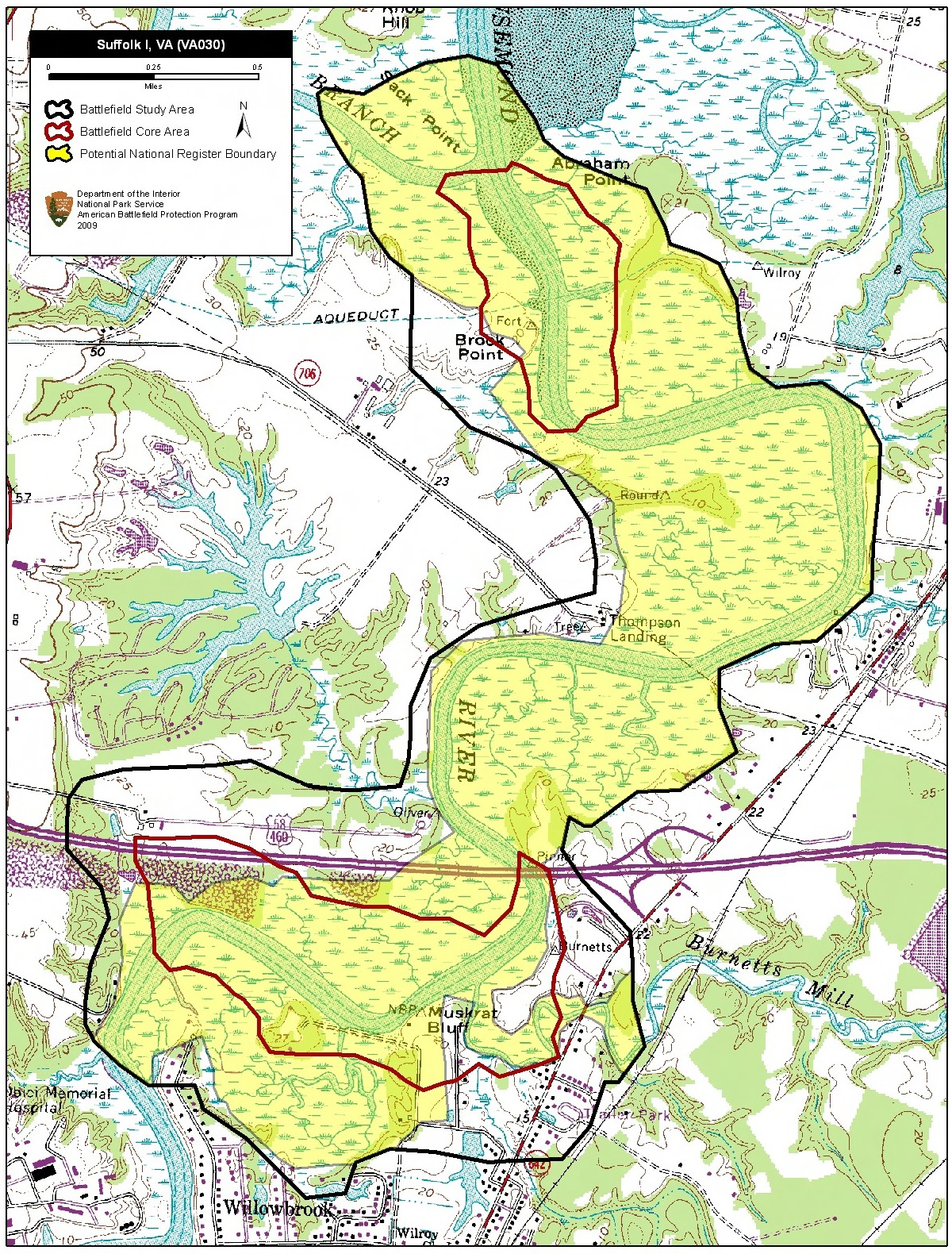
- Suffolk battlefield
Date	April 11 – May 4, 1863 (3 weeks and 2 days)
Location	Near Suffolk, Virginia 36°45′32.8″N 76°35′12.1″W
Result	Inconclusive

Belligerents
United States (Union)	Confederate States

Commanders and leaders
John Peck	James Longstreet

Strength
25,000	20,000

Casualties and losses
44 killed 202 wounded 14 missing 260 total	500 killed/wounded 400 captured 900 total

The siege of Suffolk, also known as the Battle of Suffolk, took place from April 11 to May 4, 1863, near Suffolk, Virginia during the American Civil War.

== Background ==
In 1863 Lieutenant General James Longstreet was placed in command of the Confederate Department of Virginia and North Carolina. Longstreet was given four objectives: (1) to protect Richmond, (2) give support to Robert E. Lee's Army of Northern Virginia if and when needed, (3) forage and gather supplies for the Confederate armies, (4) to capture the Union garrison at Suffolk if possible. Longstreet had three divisions of troops from the Army of Northern Virginia and North Carolina.

In cooperation with Major General D. H. Hill's advance on Washington, North Carolina, Longstreet with divisions under major generals John Bell Hood and George Pickett besieged the Union garrison at Suffolk commanded by Major General John J. Peck. The Union works were formidable and manned by 25,000 men, opposed to Longstreet's 20,000.

== Defenses ==
Peck commanded the Suffolk garrison, which was part of Major General John Dix's Department of Virginia. The garrison was manned by one division from the VII Corps under Brigadier General Michael Corcoran. Once Longstreet approached another division was borrowed from the IX Corps under George W. Getty, and a third division was transferred from the Washington defenses. Rear Admiral Samuel P. Lee lent two flotillas from the North Atlantic Blockading Squadron for naval support. Peck organized the Suffolk defenses roughly into a large circle, ringing the city. The Southwest Front was led by Colonel Robert Sanford Foster; the Southeast Front was led by Brigadier General Charles C. Dodge; the Northwest Front led by Brigadier General Henry Dwight Terry; the Northeast Front led by Colonel Arthur Dutton. Corcoran supervised the southern fronts and Getty supervised the northern fronts; river defenses were left to the navy. Peck had a good natural defensive position with the Great Dismal Swamp protecting the eastern flank and the Nansemond River protecting the western flank. The two navy flotillas were commanded by Lieutenant Roswell Lamson and Lieutenant William B. Cushing.

== The siege ==
Longstreet's forces moved against Suffolk on April 11, crossed the Nansemond River, captured several pickets and routed a cavalry regiment. However, Peck quickly secured the garrison and the Confederate advance led by Brigadier General Micah Jenkins' brigade decided not to assault the garrison and instead entrenched on the west bank of the Nansemond.

Peck felt that the southern fronts would be hit the hardest and withdrew most of the infantry from the river defenses for support thus leaving the river almost entirely to the navy. Longstreet's forces did in fact strike the southern lines first. Pickett's Confederate division probed Foster's and Dodge's fronts driving in the Union picket lines. Confederate reconnaissance showed the Union works to be too strong for a frontal attack. The next day Foster sallied out and recaptured his lost picket lines. For the next several days Pickett tested Corcoran's lines trying to find a weakness. Pickett even sent scouting parties into the Dismal Swamp looking for a possible flanking route but abandoned that idea. Longstreet quickly realized any action on the southern front would be futile and a flanking maneuver would have to be against the lightly defended river front. Action subsided on the southern front as the attention of both Peck and Longstreet moved to the north.

A second Confederate division under Hood moved up and entrenched above and below Suffolk on the west bank. Hood's infantry picked at Lieutenant Lamson's upper river flotilla, which made for an easy target but it was apparent that infantry alone could not clear the river.

=== Norfleet House ===
Battle of Norfleet House
Date	April 14, 1863 – April 15, 1863
Location	Suffolk, Virginia
Result	Inconclusive

Belligerents
United States (Union)	Confederate States

Commanders and leaders
(United States) John J. Peck	James Longstreet

Strength
17,000	20,000

Casualties and losses
- Unknown

To solve their problem on the upper Nansemond, the Confederates constructed batteries at an old Confederate fort in the lower reaches of the Nansemond and nearer to Hampton Roads, Fort Huger (this became known as the Hill's Point Battery), and a second battery at a bend in the river just below Suffolk, near a local farm owned by the Norfleet family. This battery was known as the Norfleet House Battery.

On April 14 Lamson's sailors spotted fresh dirt on the river bluffs, tell tale signs of the battery's construction. Union gunboats attempted to run the batteries at the Norfleet House slightly upstream, but the USS Mount Washington became grounded and was crippled in the attack. The Hill's Point batteries also opened fire trapping Lamson's flotilla between them. As the tide rose the USS Stepping Stones helped free the Mount Washington. The boats escaped but proved the navy alone could not protect the river and began a feud between Dix and Admiral Lee over the use of gunboats along the river. Dix insisted on their use while Lee became skeptical of the safety of his boats on the river.

Also at this point Peck realized the mistake of withdrawing the infantry from the river sector. The Federals constructed batteries to command the Confederate works at Norfleet House. Getty was immediately charged with manning the river and constructing batteries for defense. Getty constructed Battery Morris and Battery Kimball on the east side of the river directly across from the Norfleet House Battery. On April 15 Getty opened fire and after a three-hour duel the Confederate guns were silenced. This affair cost the Union Army and Navy 5 killed, 16 wounded, and 1 missing.

Lamson and Cushing were informed this obstruction was no longer a threat. However, Lamson and Lee remained skeptical of the safety of the river. The argument between Dix and Lee grew worse and eventually reached the White House. Army and Navy differences at the high command level were countered by good cooperation on a lower level between Getty and Lamson.

=== Hill's Point ===
Battle of Hill's Point
Date	April 11, 1863 – May 4, 1863
Location	Suffolk, Virginia
Result	Inconclusive

Belligerents
United States (Union)	Confederate States

Commanders and leaders
(United States) John J. Peck	(Confederate States of America) James Longstreet

Strength
- 45,000

Casualties and losses
17 total 6 killed 11 wounded	143 total 1 killed 11 wounded 1 missing 130 captured

With the Norfleet House Battery silenced, the next major river obstacle was that near the old Fort Huger at Hill's Point, where the Western Branch flowed into the Nansemond River. Getty's forces constructed Battery Stevens across the river. Lamson's sailors launched a night attack early on April 17 against Hill's Point but were driven off by Confederate pickets. Captain Hazard Stevens (son of the late General Isaac Stevens), of Getty's staff, proposed that any night attack against the battery would fail. Confederate forces in Hill's Point included 5 guns manned by 59 artillerists under Captain Robert M. Stribling; Capt. David Bozeman commanded two companies of infantry support. After observing the Confederate battery from a tree across the river, Stevens and Getty decided upon 6:00 p.m. as the time of attack—just enough daylight for the attackers to see, not enough daylight for a counterattack.

On the morning of April 19, Lamson, Cushing and Getty all opened fire on Hill's Point. At 5:00 p.m. Getty assembled 270 veteran troops and loaded them onto Lamson's Stepping Stones, covered in canvas to conceal the infantry. Getty personally led the troops while Lamson directed the navy and artillery. The plan called for the gunboat to steam downriver (attempting to trick the Confederates into thinking they were trying to run the fort), land the infantry just above the fort, the infantry will then rush the flank and rear of the fort. Detachments of the Union Army's 8th Connecticut and 89th New York Infantry Regiments landed on Hill's Point at the confluence of the forks of the Nansemond River.

The operation was running smoothly. Three hundred yards from the landing point the canvas sides were dropped, revealing the infantry. With just 30 feet to go, the Stepping Stones grounded on an unseen obstruction in the river and came to a halt. The Union infantry stood fully exposed on the decks with 30 feet of unknown-depth water separating them from the bank. Fortunately for the Union troops, Bozeman's Confederates were not at their posts (most likely still taking cover from the earlier Union bombardment). Leading by example, Captain Stevens pushed his way through the troops and plunged into the water and waded ashore. The example worked as 100 more soldiers followed holding rifles above their heads to keep them from getting wet. Meanwhile, Lamson, remaining calm, maneuvered the boat closer to shore where the rest of the infantry helped unload the howitzers. Stevens and the first 100 fixed bayonets and rushed the flank. The rest of the infantry moved against the rear. Bozeman's infantry appeared while Stribling turned the battery's guns on the attackers. Without ever firing a shot Getty's infantry reached the fort. The entire garrison at Hill's Point surrendered just 10 minutes from the time the infantry had landed. Since the attackers had not fired a shot, no Confederates were wounded or killed, but all 130 men were captured. Getty suffered 3 killed and 10 wounded. Lamson had no casualties, but Cushing suffered 3 killed and 1 wounded in the morning bombardment. Within the battery were guns which had been captured by Stonewall Jackson at Harpers Ferry the previous year.

Getty worked quickly to strengthen the post for the inevitable counterattack. Lamson hauled the howitzers into the battery and Cushing occasionally lobbed shells into the surrounding woods to discourage Confederate troops from forming there. Late into the night Colonel John K. Connally brought forward inexperienced North Carolina troops. Connally pushed forward and wary of attacking an unknown enemy in the dark had his men lay down. Anxiety got the best of Connally's troops and they opened fire revealing their positions in the darkness. Getty returned an accurate fire while Major General Evander M. Law arrived and ordered Connally to withdraw. Major General Samuel G. French, Longstreet's third divisional commander, arrived and decided against any further attack against Getty figuring it would be foolish of the Union troops to remain in their isolated position across the river in enemy territory. Connally's actions cost 11 wounded and 1 missing.

The following day Hood made a reconnaissance, but Getty did not budge and instead was found to be improving and strengthening his post. Dutton was called up from the Suffolk defenses to take command at Hill's Point, which now numbered 1,000 troops. On April 21, after long consideration Getty decided to abandon Hill's Point. The Confederates reoccupied the point but it no longer posed a threat.

== Lifting the siege ==
Lamson, discouraged at the removal of the Union troops from Hill's Point, withdrew his gunboats from the Nansemond River but made a deal with Getty that he would return the gunboats if pickets could be sent to Hill's Point. Getty's infantry tried three times to cross the river but were turned back each time.

On April 24, Corcoran's Union division mounted a reconnaissance-in-force from Fort Dix against Pickett's extreme right flank. The Federals approached cautiously and were easily repulsed.

While Longstreet had conceded to besieging the Union garrison instead of a quicker frontal assault, it did allow his troops to conduct a highly successful foraging campaign in the Blackwater region. Suffolk's close proximity to Washington, D.C., allowed for both General-in-Chief Henry W. Halleck and Secretary of State William H. Seward to make visits to the Suffolk defenses. Seward even stayed overnight in Suffolk and Peck renamed one of his fortresses in his honor.

On April 29, Lee directed Longstreet to disengage from Suffolk and rejoin the Army of Northern Virginia at Fredericksburg.

Finally on April 30, Lamson's sailors landed on Hill's Point and set up pickets. Peck also received reports of Union movements and assured Hooker he could hold Longstreet at Suffolk. On May 1, the first day of fighting at the Battle of Chancellorsville, Hooker insisted to Peck that Longstreet had rejoined Lee, although Peck insisted that he had not left Suffolk. None of Longstreet's forces had returned to Lee by this point but the Confederate foraging wagons began to move back to the North. It was clear at this point that Lee and Hooker were engaged in a major battle, but Longstreet informed Richmond that he would not withdraw until the wagons were safe. On May 3 the withdrawal orders were given. Early on May 3 Getty's division attacked Law's Alabamians and captured the first line of Confederate trenches. The fighting produced relatively high casualties while Longstreet decided to continue with his withdrawal plans later in the day. Corcoran's front pursued Pickett as he withdrew, but they were unable to catch up to the retreating Confederates. By May 4, the last of Longstreet's command had crossed the Blackwater River en route to Richmond. By May 9 Longstreet had rejoined Lee near Fredericksburg.

== Aftermath ==
Given Longstreet's original objectives, he had completely succeeded in two of them: foraging and protecting Richmond. The only objective Longstreet completely failed to achieve was the capture of the Federal garrison at Suffolk. On the other hand, Union primary objective in the campaign had been to hold Suffolk, which they had done. However, while Peck was putting up a defense of Suffolk his forces were unable to prevent Longstreet from foraging. It would be fair to say that both sides had achieved several of their primary goals. Peck was commended by Dix for his handling of the Suffolk defenses. The campaign against Suffolk would be Longstreet's first independent command.
