= Siege of Suffolk order of battle: Union =

The following Union Army units and commanders fought in the Siege of Suffolk of the American Civil War. The Confederate order of battle is listed separately. The casualties are derived from the Official Records.

== Abbreviations used ==
=== Military rank ===
- MG = Major General
- BG = Brigadier General
- Col = Colonel
- Ltc = Lieutenant Colonel
- Maj = Major
- Cpt = Captain
- Lt = Lieutenant

=== Other ===
- w = wounded
- mw = mortally wounded
- k = killed
- c = captured
- m = missing

== Department of Virginia & VII Corps ==
MG Erasmus D. Keyes (6–14 April)
MG John A. Dix (14 April-15 July)

=== Suffolk Garrison ===
MG John J. Peck

- Assistant Adjutant General: Maj Benjamin B. Foster
- Quartermaster General: Cpt George S. Dodge

Division	Brigade	Regiments
First Division, VII Corps; BG Michael Corcoran	1st Brigade BG Henry Dwight Terry; 15k, 68w, 0m = 83	26th Michigan: Col Judson S. Farrar; 1st New York Sharpshooter Btln.: Cpt Thomas S. Bradley; 99th New York: Col David Wardrop, Ltc Richard Nixon; 130th New York: Col Alfred Gibbs; 152nd New York: Col Alonzo Ferguson; 167th Pennsylvania: Ltc Joseph D. Davis; 11th Rhode Island: Col George E. Church
First Division, VII Corps; BG Michael Corcoran	2nd Brigade Col Robert S. Foster; 2k, 27w, 1m = 30	13th Indiana: Ltc Cyrus J. Dobbs; 6th Massachusetts: Col Albert S. Follansbee; 112th New York: Col Jeremiah C. Drake; 169th New York: Col Clarence Buell (w); 165th Pennsylvania: Col Charles H. Buehler; 166th Pennsylvania: Col Andrew J. Fulton
First Division, VII Corps; BG Michael Corcoran	3rd Brigade "Irish Legion" Col Mathew Murphy; 1k, 14w, 0m = 15	10th New Jersey: Col Henry O. Ryerson; 155th New York: Col William McEvily; 164th New York: Col James P. McMahon; 170th New York: Col James P. McIvor; 182nd New York: Ltc Thomas M. Reid
3rd Division, IX Corps; BG George W. Getty	1st Brigade Col Rush C. Hawkins; Col Harrison S. Fairchild; 6k, 27w, 0m = 33	10th New Hampshire: Col Michael T. Donohoe; 9th New York: Ltc Edgar Kimball (k); 89th New York: Col Harrison S. Fairchild; 103rd New York: Col Benjamin Ringold (mw); 117th New York: Col William R. Pease
3rd Division, IX Corps; BG George W. Getty	2nd Brigade BG Edward Harland; 10k, 44w, 0m = 54	8th Connecticut: Ltc John E. Ward; 11th Connecticut: Col Griffin A. Stedman II; 15th Connecticut: Col Charles L. Upham; 16th Connecticut: Col Francis Beach
3rd Division, IX Corps; BG George W. Getty	3rd Brigade Col Arthur H. Dutton; 7k, 36w, 0m = 43	21st Connecticut: Maj Hiram B. Crosby; 13th New Hampshire: Col Aaron F. Stevens; 25th New Jersey: Col Andrew Derrom; 4th Rhode Island: Col William H.P. Steere
Reserve Division, VII Corps; Col David Gurney (17 Apr-1 May); BG George H. Gordon (1–4 May)	2nd Brigade Col Burr Porter; 0k, 0w, 0m = 0	22nd Connecticut: Col George S. Burnham; 40th Massachusetts: Maj Joseph M. Day; 141st New York: Ltc William K. Logie
Reserve Division, VII Corps; Col David Gurney (17 Apr-1 May); BG George H. Gordon (1–4 May)	3rd Brigade Col Robert S. Hughston; Col David Gurney; 0k, 0w, 0m = 0	127th New York: Ltc Stewart L. Woodford; 142nd New York: Col Newton Martin Curtis; 143rd New York: Col Horace Boughton; 144th New York: Ltc David E. Gregory
Artillery	Light Artillery Cpt Frederick M. Follet; 0k, 0w, 0m = 0	1st Delaware Battery: Cpt Benjamin Nields; 7th Massachusetts Battery: Cpt Phineas A. Davis; 16th New York Battery: Cpt Frederick L. Hiller; 19th New York Battery: Cpt William H. Stahl; 2nd Wisconsin Battery: Cpt Charles Beger; 4th Wisconsin Battery: Cpt John F. Vallee; Battery D, 4th U.S. Artillery: Cpt Frederick M. Follet; Battery L, 4th U.S. Artillery: Cpt Robert V.W. Howard
Artillery	Heavy Artillery 0k, 0w, 0m = 0	2nd Battalion, 3rd Pennsylvania Heavy Artillery: Cpt John A. Blake
Other	Cavalry Col Samuel P. Spear; 0k, 4w, 1m = 5	1st New York Mounted Rifles: Ltc Benjamin F. Onderdonk; 11th Pennsylvania Cavalry: Col Samuel P. Spear
Other	Reserve Brigade Col David Wardrop; 0k, 0w, 0m = 0	118th New York: Ltc Oliver Keese II; 9th Vermont: Col Dudley K. Andross; 19th Wisconsin: Horace T. Sanders

== North Atlantic Blockading Squadron ==
Acting Rear Admiral Samuel P. Lee
9k, 16w, 4m = 29

Flotilla	Ships
Lower Nansemond Flotilla Lt William B. Cushing	USS Commodore Barney (flagship): Lt William B. Cushing; USS Primrose: Acting Master William T. Street; USS Teaser: Acting Ensign Philip Sheridan; USS Yankee: Acting Master Thomas P. Ives
Upper Nansemond Flotilla Lt Roswell Lamson	USS Stepping Stones (flaghship): Acting Master T.A. Harris; USS Alert: Acting Master Mate J. Bishop; USS Mount Washington: Lt Roswell H. Lamson; USS Zouave: Acting Master & Pilot S. Cox; USS Coeur de Lion: Acting Master Charles H. Brown; USS Smith Briggs: Cpt John C. Lee; West End: Cpt Frederick A. Rowe
