= John Brosnan (soldier) =

Irish soldier who fought in the American Civil War

- Born: July 1, 1846; Ireland
- Died: August 7, 1921 (aged 75); Brooklyn, New York
- Military career
- Allegiance: United States of America
- Branch: United States Army; Union Army
- Service years: 1862–1865
- Rank: Sergeant
- Unit: (New York (state)) 164th Regiment New York Volunteer Infantry - Company E
- Conflicts: Second Battle of Petersburg
- Awards: Medal of Honor

Sergeant John Brosnan (July 1, 1846 – August 7, 1921) was an Irish soldier who fought in the American Civil War. Brosnan received the United States' highest award for bravery during combat, the Medal of Honor, for his actions during the Second Battle of Petersburg in Virginia on July 17, 1864. He was awarded the medal on January 18, 1894.

== Biography ==
John Brosnan was born in Ireland on July 1, 1846. He enlisted as a private in the 164th New York Infantry on August 2, 1862. The 164th New York Infantry, along with the 155th New York Infantry, 170th New York Infantry, 175th New York Infantry, and 182nd New York Infantry, formed a brigade of Irish soldiers known as Corcoran's Legion.

While serving as a sergeant in command of his company, Brosnan performed an act of gallantry that earned him the Medal of Honor. On the morning of June 17, 1864, during the Second Battle of Petersburg, Brosnan responded to the cries of Corporal Michael Carroll, a member of his company who had been wounded by hidden Confederate forces and was lying exposed to heavy enemy fire. Under intense fire, Brosnan attempted to rescue Carroll by lifting him in his arms and carrying him out of the line of fire. Brosnan was wounded during the rescue and subsequently lost an arm as a result. He was discharged from service in February 1865 due to his injuries.

After the war, Brosnan resided in New York. He died on August 7, 1921, and was interred at Holy Cross Cemetery in Brooklyn.

== Medal of Honor citation ==
Rescued a wounded comrade who lay exposed to the enemy's fire, receiving a severe wound in the effort.

== See also ==
- List of American Civil War Medal of Honor recipients: A–F
