= Siege of Suffolk order of battle =

The order of battle for the Siege of Suffolk includes:

- Siege of Suffolk order of battle: Confederate
- Siege of Suffolk order of battle: Union
