= 165th Pennsylvania Infantry Regiment =

- Also known as the 165th Pennsylvania or the 165th Pennsylvania Volunteers
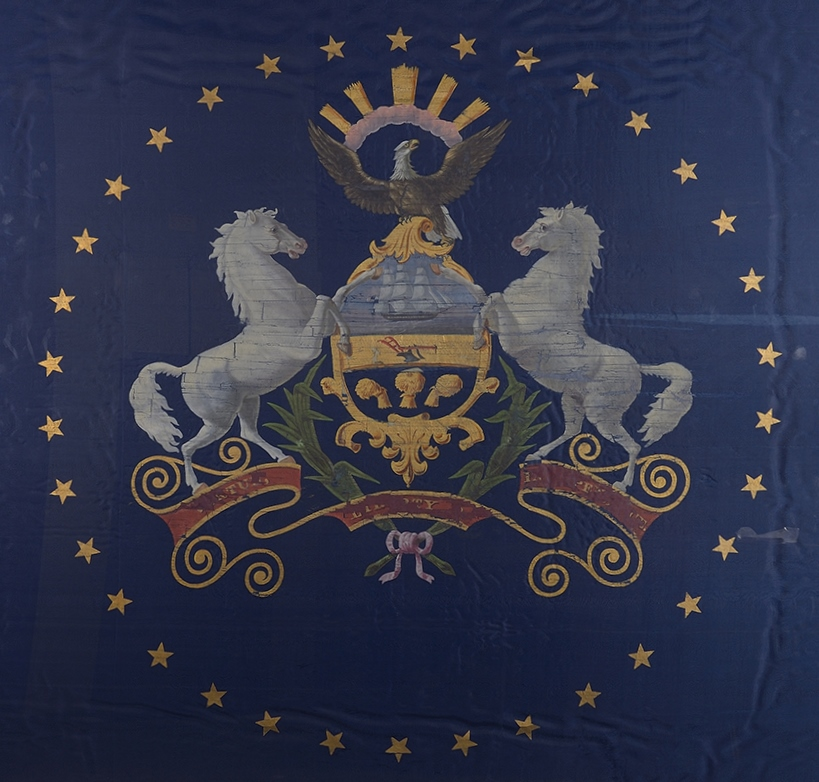
- State Flag of Pennsylvania (1863)
- Active: November 25 to December 5, 1862 - July 28, 1863.
- Country: United States
- Allegiance: Union
- Branch: Union Army
- Type: Infantry
- Part of: VII Corps
- Engagements: Expedition to Blackwater, Virginia; Battle of Deserted House (Companies A and F); Siege of Suffolk; Foster's Expedition; Dix's Peninsula Campaign

Commanders
- Notable commanders: Colonel Charles H. Buehler; Lieutenant Colonel Edward G. Fahnestock

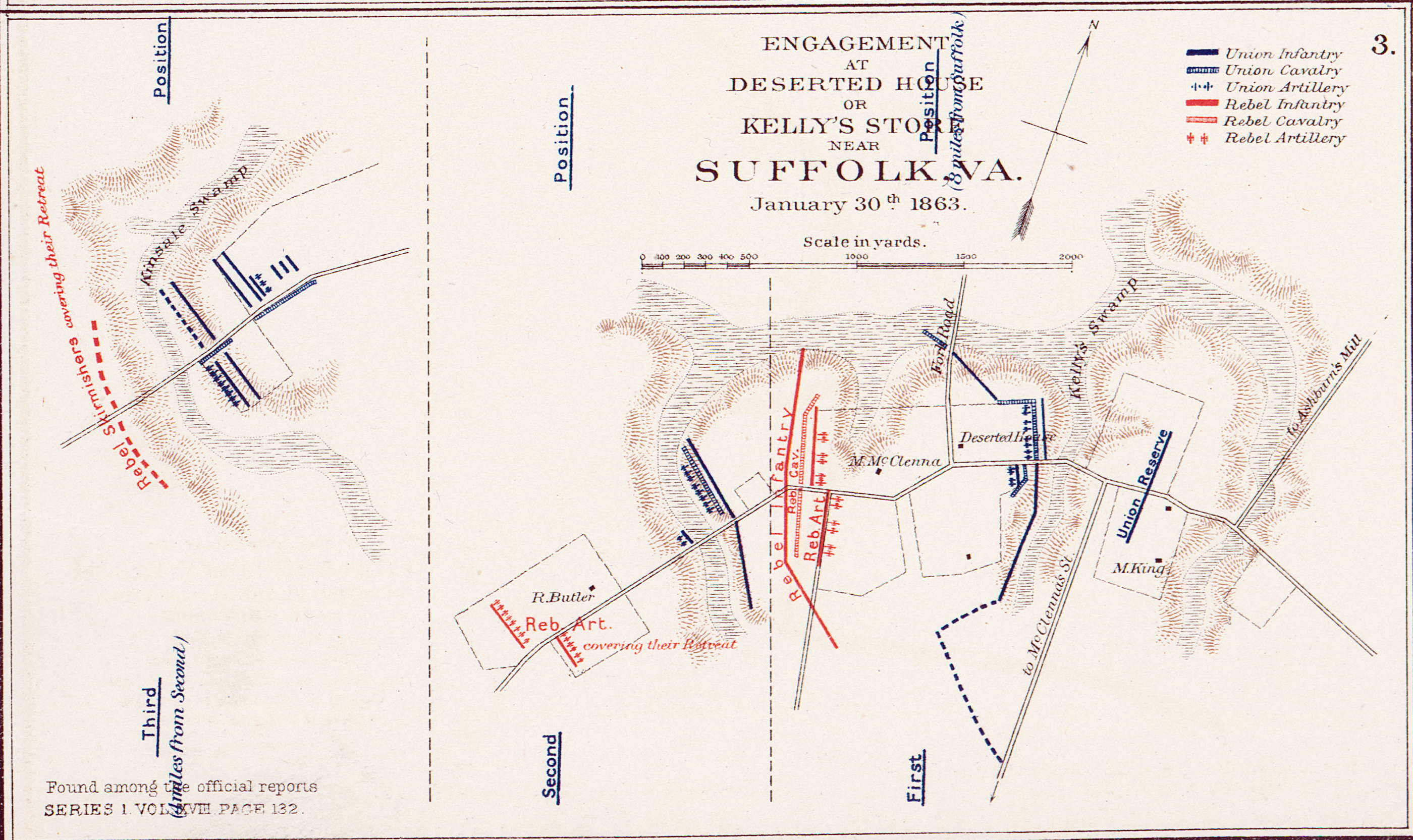
Map of the Battle of Deserted House, in which companies A and F took part in

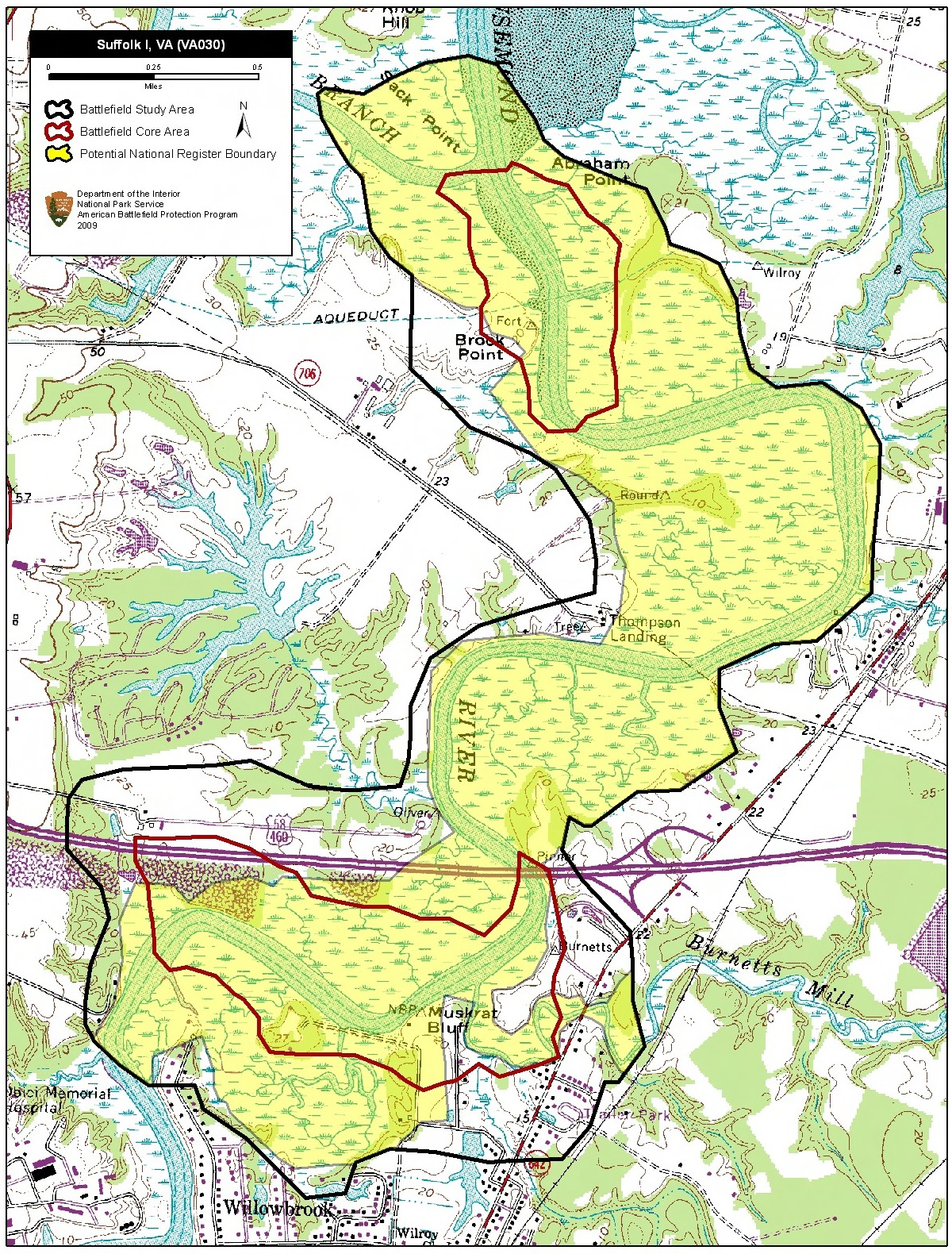
Map of the Suffolk battlefield core and study areas. The Study Area was expanded to accommodate a second Core Area that represents the Federal gunboat attack on April 14 against the Confederate battery at Hill’s Point.

The 165th Pennsylvania Infantry Regiment served with the Union Army during the American Civil War. Organized at Chambersburg and Gettysburg, they took part in battles in Virginia, notably in the Siege of Suffolk, until they were mustered out.

== Organization ==
The regiment was recruited from the counties of Franklin, Cumberland, and Adams County. They were rendezvoused in early November 1862, at Chambersburg and at Gettysburg, and were organized and mustered into service between November 25 to December 5, 1862.

== Service ==
=== Early service ===
On December 8, 1863, left the state and moved to Washington, D.C.,and then to Suffolk, Virginia, for instruction, drilling, picket, guard, and provost duties, and was attached to Foster's Brigade, 1st Division of the VII Corps.

In January 1863, the regiment would take part in an expedition to Blackwater, Virginia (January 8-10), along with the 130th New York, moving through the Great Dismal Swamp, but encountered no Confederate forces there. On January 29, Confederate forces appeared at Deserted House, and Companies A and F would take part in the Battle of Deserted House, along with the 6th Massachusetts, skirmishing with the Confederates, which lasted until daylight, when the Confederates were routed. Subsequently, Companies D and I, along with the two companies of the 112th New York, were sent to pursue the Confederates, occasionally skirmishing with the retreating Confederates, but failed to fully defeat them. The regiment suffered one severe and several slight wounds during the battle.

=== Siege of Suffolk and Foster's Raid ===
In Early April, General Longstreet and his 40,000 Confederates moved towards Suffolk, intending to capture it and open the way to Portsmouth and Norfolk, but failed in launching a direct assault on the city; instead, he laid siege to the town. On April 15, four companies of the 165th and 166th Pennsylvania launched an unsuccessful attack on Confederate rifle pits by Samuel P. Spear of the 11th Pennsylvania Cavalry. On April 24, elements of the 165th, along with the 6th Massachusetts, 166th Pennsylvania, and a section of Neil's Battery, launched an attack against entrenched Confederate positions on the Somerton Road, serving as a diversion for General Corcoran's main attack. (2 Killed or Mortally Wounded, several wounded)

After the siege was lifted, Longstreet and his forces would retreat to Petersburg. On May 13, the regiment would take part in an expedition led by Colonel Foster to guard a working party in breaking up the Weldon railroads. Fourteen miles from the railroad, the regiment would later take part in a skirmish just a few miles from the railroad. Still, being unable to use artillery in their current position, they retired to more open ground near the village of Carrsville, in which a battle took place. In contrast, the destruction of the railroad continued.

=== Later service and mustering out ===
On June 27, the regiment embarked for White House Landing on the Pamunkey River and would take part in Dix's Peninsula Campaign. The regiment moved to Hanover Court House, breaking up railroads and destroying bridges over the South Anna River.

After the Campaign, they returned to Yorktown, Virginia. In the meantime, the enlistment period of the 165th had expired, and they returned to Gettysburg, where it was mustered out of Service on July 28, 1863.

== Notable commanders ==
- Colonel Charles H. Buehler
- Lieutenant Colonel Edward G. Fahnestock

== Casualties ==
Regiment lost during service: 1 killed and 1 officer, and 14 Enlisted men by disease, 16 in aggregate.

== See also ==
- List of Pennsylvania units in the American Civil War
- Pennsylvania in the American Civil War
