= Blackwater, Virginia =

Blackwater, Virginia may refer to the following places in Virginia:

- Blackwater, Lee County, Virginia
- Blackwater, Mathews County, Virginia
