= Michael Corcoran =

Irish American general

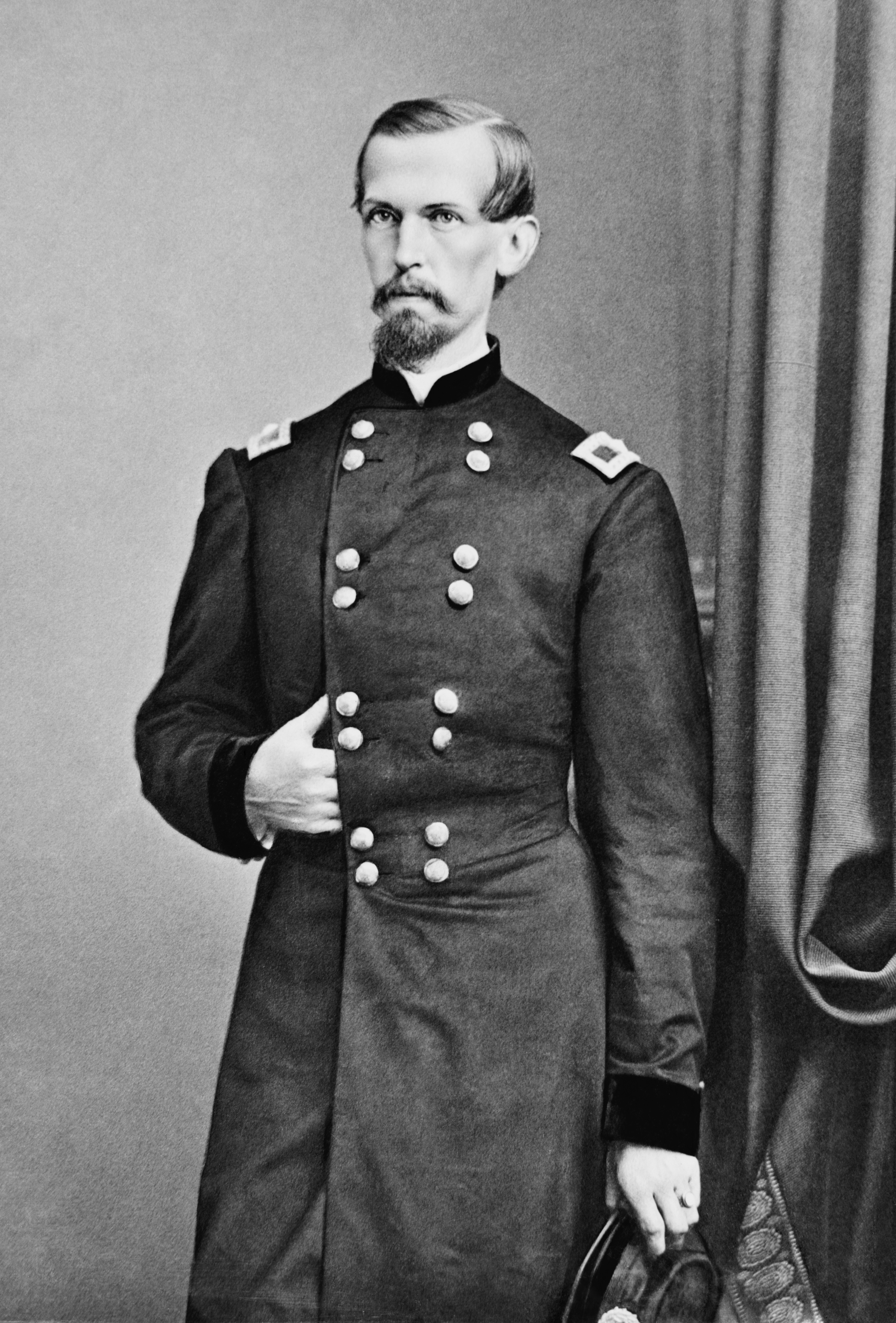
- Brig. Gen. Michael Corcoran
- Born: 21 September 1827; Carrowkeel, County Sligo, Ireland
- Died: 22 December 1863 (aged 36); Fairfax, Virginia
- Burial place: Calvary Cemetery, Woodside, New York
- Military career
- Allegiance: United States of America; Union
- Branch: United States Army; Union Army
- Service years: 1861–1863
- Rank: Brigadier General
- Nickname: "Mick"
- Commands: 69th New York Militia, "Corcoran’s Irish Legion"
- Conflicts: American Civil War; First Battle of Bull Run; Battle of Deserted House; Siege of Suffolk

Michael Corcoran (21 September 1827 – 22 December 1863) was an Irish-American general in the Union Army during the American Civil War and a close confidant of President Abraham Lincoln. As its colonel, he led the 69th New York Regiment to Washington, D.C., and was one of the first to serve in the defense of Washington by building Fort Corcoran. He then led the 69th into action at the First Battle of Bull Run. After promotion to brigadier general, he left the 69th and formed the Corcoran Legion, consisting of at least five other New York regiments.

== Early life ==
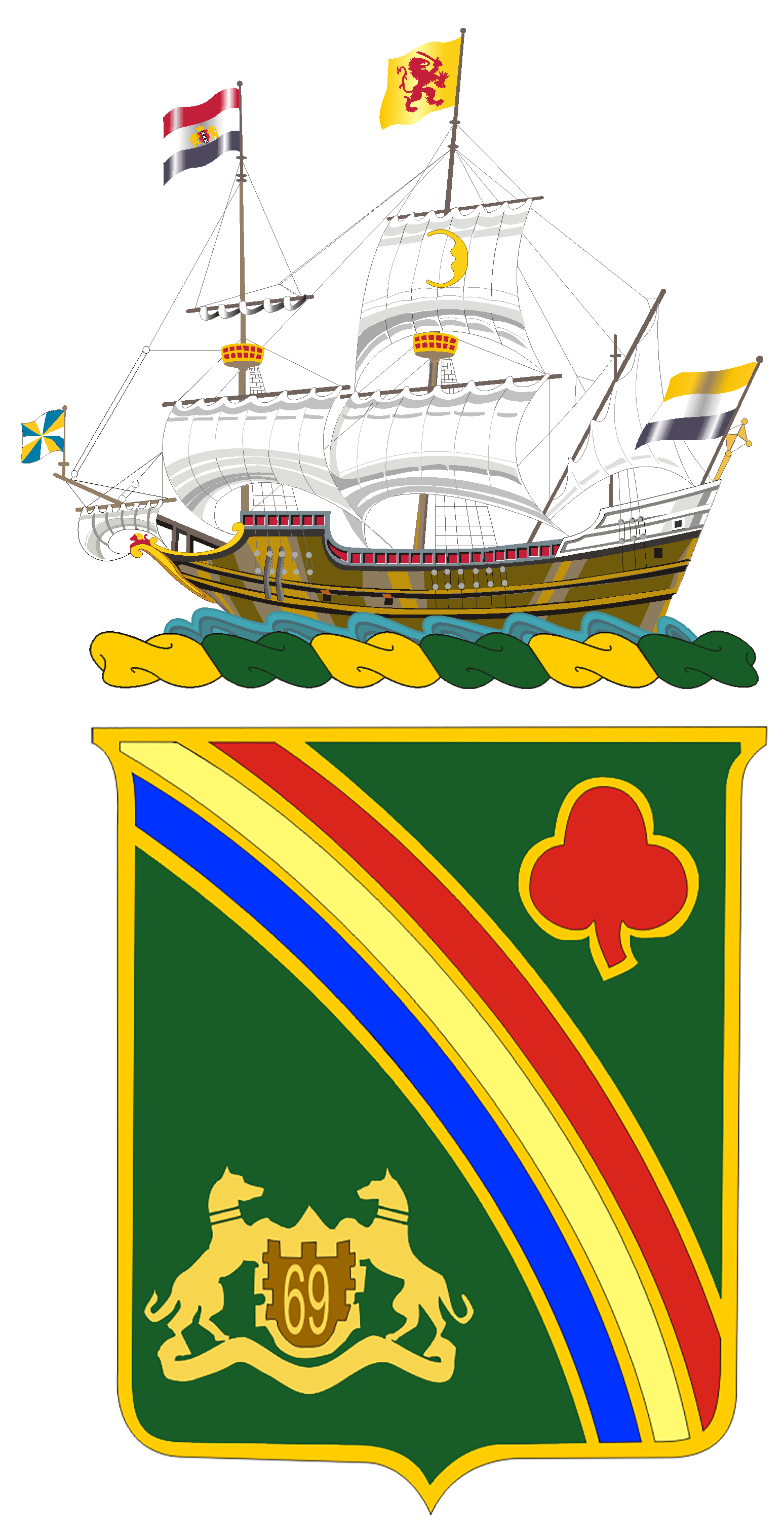
Coat of arms of The Fighting 69th

Corcoran was born in Carrowkeel, near Ballysadare, County Sligo in Ireland, the only child of Thomas Corcoran, an officer in the British Army, and Mary (McDonagh) Corcoran. Through his mother, he claimed descent from Patrick Sarsfield, hero of the Williamite War in Ireland and a leader of the Wild Geese.

In 1846, at the age of 18, he took an appointment to the Revenue Police, enforcing the laws and searching for illicit stills and distilling activities in Creeslough, County Donegal. At the same time he joined and belonged to a Catholic rebel guerrilla group, the Ribbonmen. On 30 August 1849, he emigrated from Sligo Bay to the U.S. and settled in New York City where he found work as a clerk in the tavern, Hibernian House, at 42 Prince Street in Manhattan owned by John Heaney, whose niece, Elizabeth, he married in 1854.

He enlisted as a Private in the 69th New York Militia. By 1859 he was appointed colonel of the regiment. The regiment was a state militia unit at that time composed of citizens, not soldiers, and was involved in the maintenance of public order. On 11 October 1860, Colonel Corcoran refused to march the regiment on parade for the 19-year-old Prince of Wales, who was visiting New York City at the time, to protest against British rule in Ireland. He was removed from command and a court martial was pending over that matter when the Civil War began.

Corcoran became involved in Democratic politics at Tammany Hall: he could deliver the Irish vote. He became district leader, a member of the judicial nominations committee, an elected school inspector for his ward, and a member of the Fourteenth Ward General Committee.

== Civil War ==
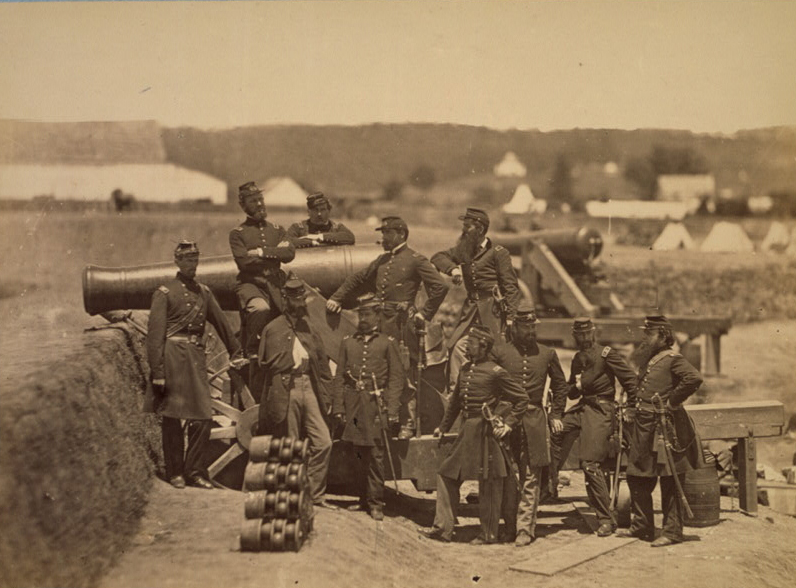
Officers of the 69th New York Volunteer Regiment pose with a cannon at Fort Corcoran in 1861. Michael Corcoran at left

With the outbreak of war, the court martial was dropped and Corcoran was restored to his command because he had been instrumental in bringing other Irish immigrants to the Union cause. He led the 69th to Washington, D.C., and served for a while in the Washington defenses building Fort Corcoran. In July he led the regiment into action at the First Battle of Bull Run and was taken prisoner.

Corcoran was one of the founders of the Fenian Brotherhood in America. While in jail, Corcoran wrote, "One half of my heart is Erin's, and the other half is America's. God bless America, and ever preserve her the asylum of all the oppressed of the earth, is the sincere prayer of my heart."

In April 1863 Corcoran was involved in an incident that ended with Corcoran shooting and killing Edgar A. Kimball, commander of the 9th New York Volunteer Infantry Regiment. Corcoran attempted to pass through the 9th New York's area without giving the required password after receiving the challenge from a sentry. When Kimball intervened on the side of the sentry, Corcoran shot Kimball. At a court of inquiry, Kimball was faulted for interacting with Corcoran though Kimball was not on duty and was not a sentry, and for using menacing and insulting language. In addition, some witnesses suggested that Kimball was intoxicated when he confronted Corcoran. Corcoran was found at fault for not providing the required password; he was reprimanded by the court, but not subjected to further punishment.

== Corcoran Legion and death ==
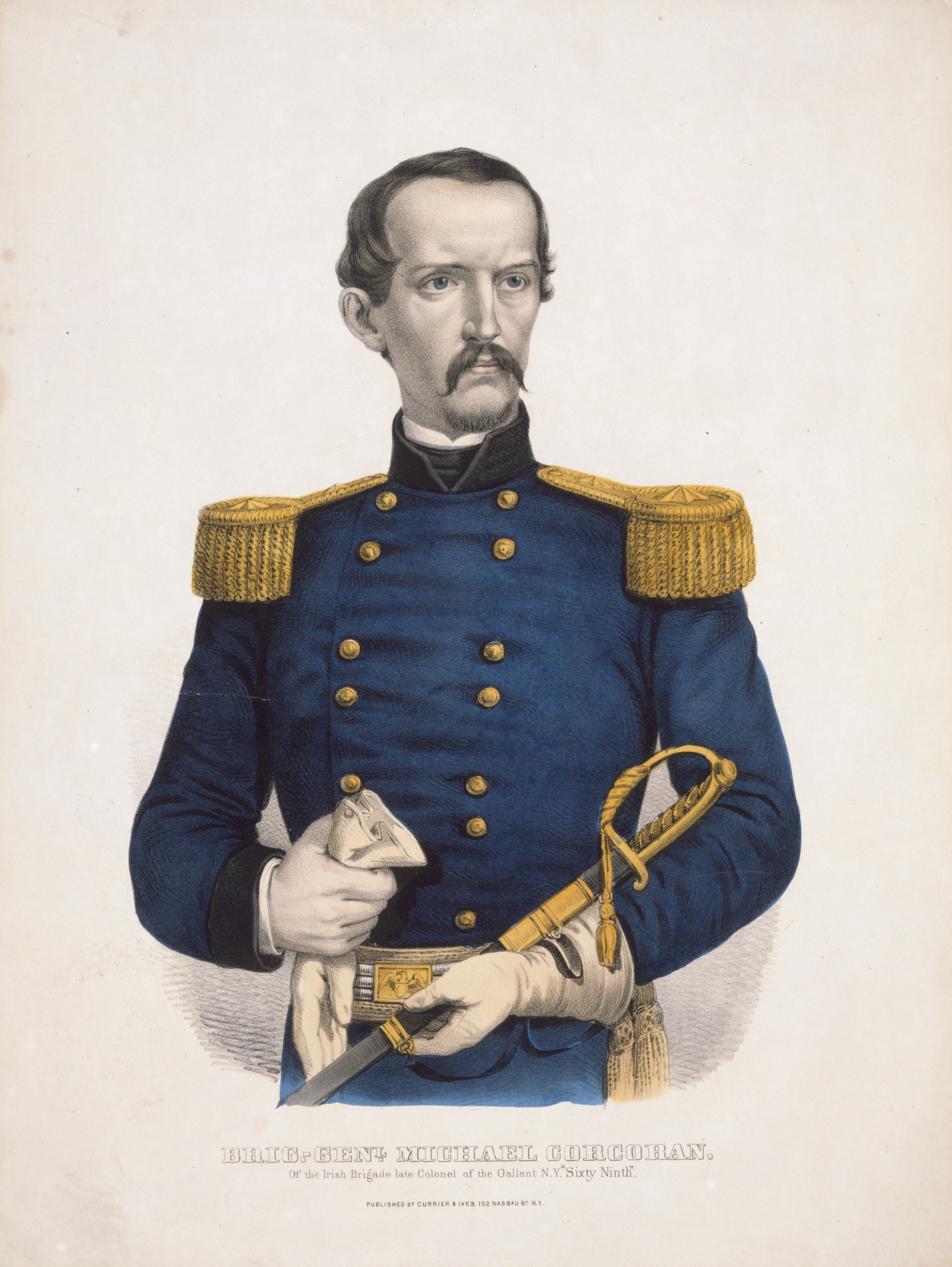
Currier & Ives lithograph of Brig. Gen. Michael Corcoran

Corcoran returned to the army and set about recruiting more Irish volunteers. He raised and took command of what would be known as the Corcoran Legion:
The Legion consisted of:

- 1st Regiment-formed of the 1st and 6th Regiment; later the 182nd New York Volunteer Infantry
- 2nd Regiment-formed of the 5th and 6th Regiment; later the 155th New York Volunteer Infantry
- 3rd Regiment-formed of the 3rd; 7th and 8th Regiment; later the 164th New York Volunteer Infantry
- 4th Regiment-formed of the 2nd Regiment; later the 170th New York Volunteer Infantry
- 5th Regiment-never served with Brigade; later the 175th New York Volunteer Infantry
- 6th Regiment-below minimum strength-later part of 1st and 2nd Regiment
- 7th Regiment-below minimum strength-later part of the 3rd Regiment
- 8th Regiment-below minimum strength-later part of the 3rd Regiment

Placed in command of the 1st Division, VII Corps he was engaged in the Battle of Deserted House and took part in the siege of Suffolk. In late 1863 he was placed in command of a division in the XXII Corps and returned to serve in the Washington defenses. While riding alone in Fairfax, Virginia, he was thrown from a runaway horse and suffered a fractured skull. He died at the W.P. Gunnell House on 22 December 1863, at the age of 36.

== Ballymote Memorial ==
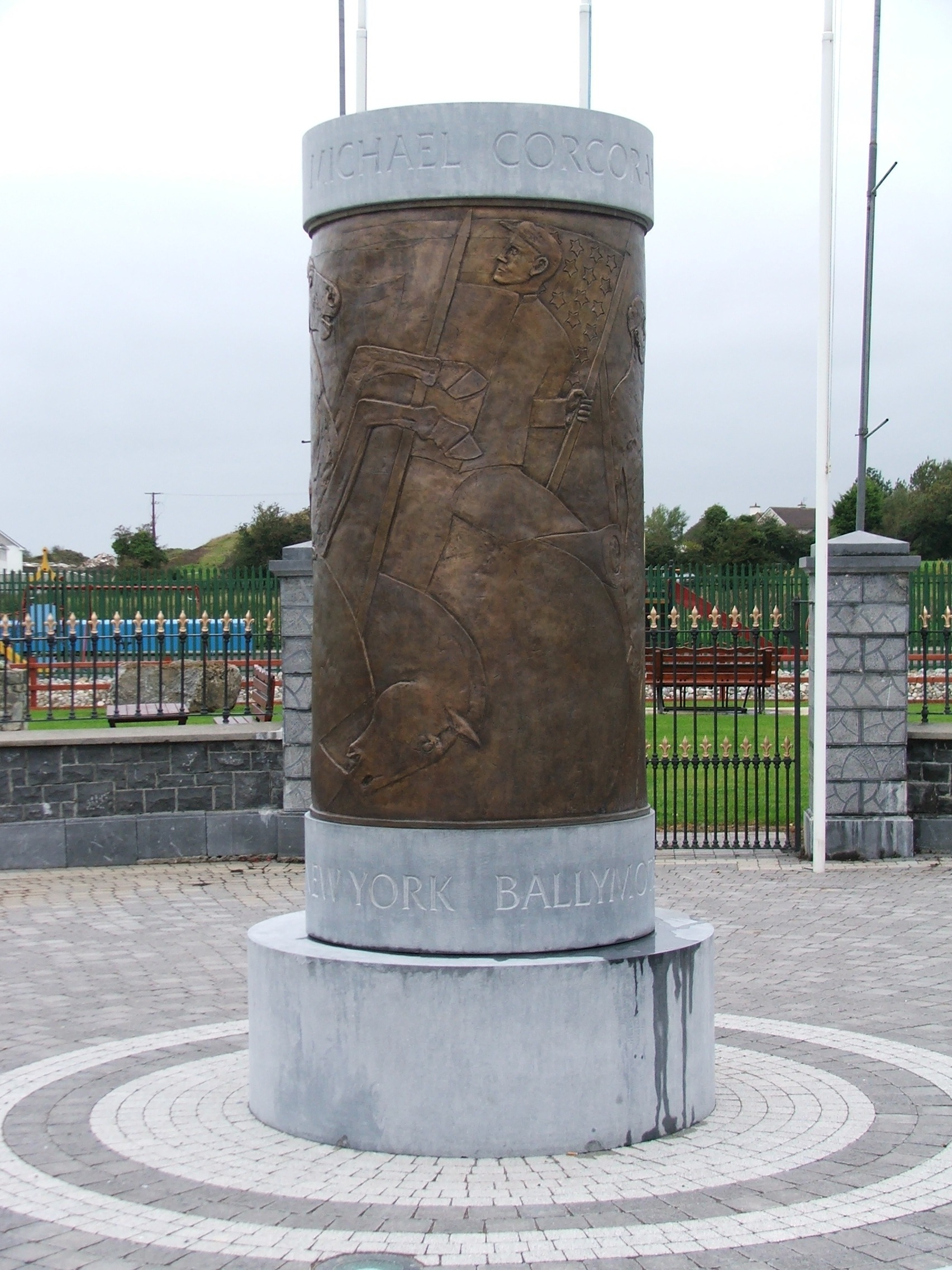
Monument to Fighting 69th in Ballymote

The Mayor of New York City, Michael Bloomberg unveiled Ireland's national monument to the Fighting 69th in Ballymote on 22 August 2006. The monument was sculpted by Philip Flanagan. The inscription around the top of the monument reads "Michael Corcoran 1827–1863" Around the base is inscribed "New York Ballymote Creeslough Bull Run". Underneath the monument is a piece of steel from the World Trade Center, donated by the family of Michael Lynch, who died in the towers on 11 September 2001. Lynch's family are also from County Sligo.

== See also ==
- List of American Civil War generals (Union)
- Irish military diaspora
- Irish Brigade
- Irish regiment
- Irish-American Heritage Month
