= 166th Pennsylvania Infantry Regiment =

- Also Known as the 166th Pennsylvania or 166th Pennsylvania Volunteers
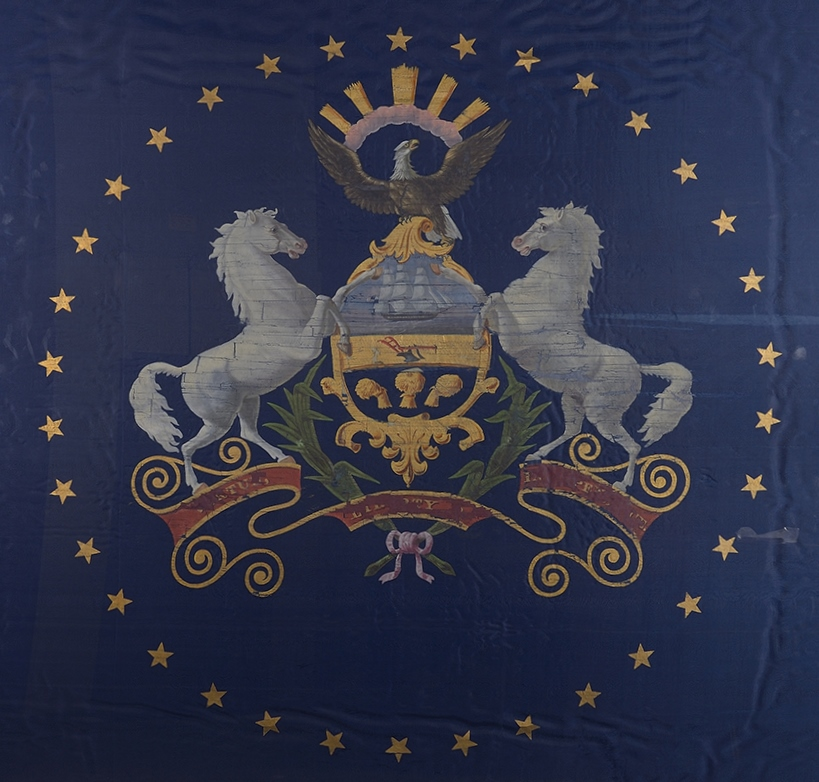
- Active: October 24 to December 8, 1862 - July 28, 1863
- Country: United States
- Allegiance: Union
- Branch: Union Army
- Type: Infantry
- Size: 705 men (Muster in strength); 630 men (Muster out strength)
- Part of: VII Corps
- Engagements: Battle of Deserted House (January 30, 1863); Action at Leesville (April 4, 1863); Siege of Suffolk (April 11 – May 4, 1863); Operations on Seaboard & Roanoke Railroad ( May 12-26); Dix's Peninsula Campaign (June 27-July 7)

The 166th Pennsylvania Infantry Regiment, also known as the 166th Pennsylvania Volunteer Infantry Regiment, was an infantry regiment that served in the Union Army during the American Civil War. Composed of drafted men serving nine months' service, the regiment would spend the majority of its service in Virginia, where it fought at the Siege of Suffolk, and would later participate in Dix's Peninsula Campaign.

== Organization ==
When Pennsylvania did not meet President Lincoln's August 1862 request for 300,000 nine-month volunteers, the Commonwealth drafted (under the Federal Militia Act of 1862) fifteen regiments between mid-October and early December 1862, totaling 15,000 men. All fifteen regiments were mustered out of service by mid-August 1863. Few saw any combat action.

The regiment was organized at York from October 24 to December 8, 1862, with the companies of the regiment only being recruited from York County. Colonel Andrew J. Fulton, who previously served as a captain in the 87th Pennsylvania, took command of the regiment.

== Service ==
After the regiment was organized, the 705-strong 166th Pennsylvania left the state. It moved to Washington, D.C. on December 8, where it was stationed until December 10, when it moved to Newport News via transport, and subsequently moved to Suffolk, Virginia on December 17, where it was attached to Foster’s Brigade, Division at Suffolk, Va., VII Corps.

=== Blackwater Expedition ===
While it was stationed at Suffolk, the regiment was sent on an expedition by Maj. Gen. John J. Peck, who was commanding the Suffolk garrison, moved towards Blackwater. With 14,000 men, alongside a few small gunboats, the regiment took part in engagements at Deserted House (January 30, 1863) and Leesville (April 4, 1863).

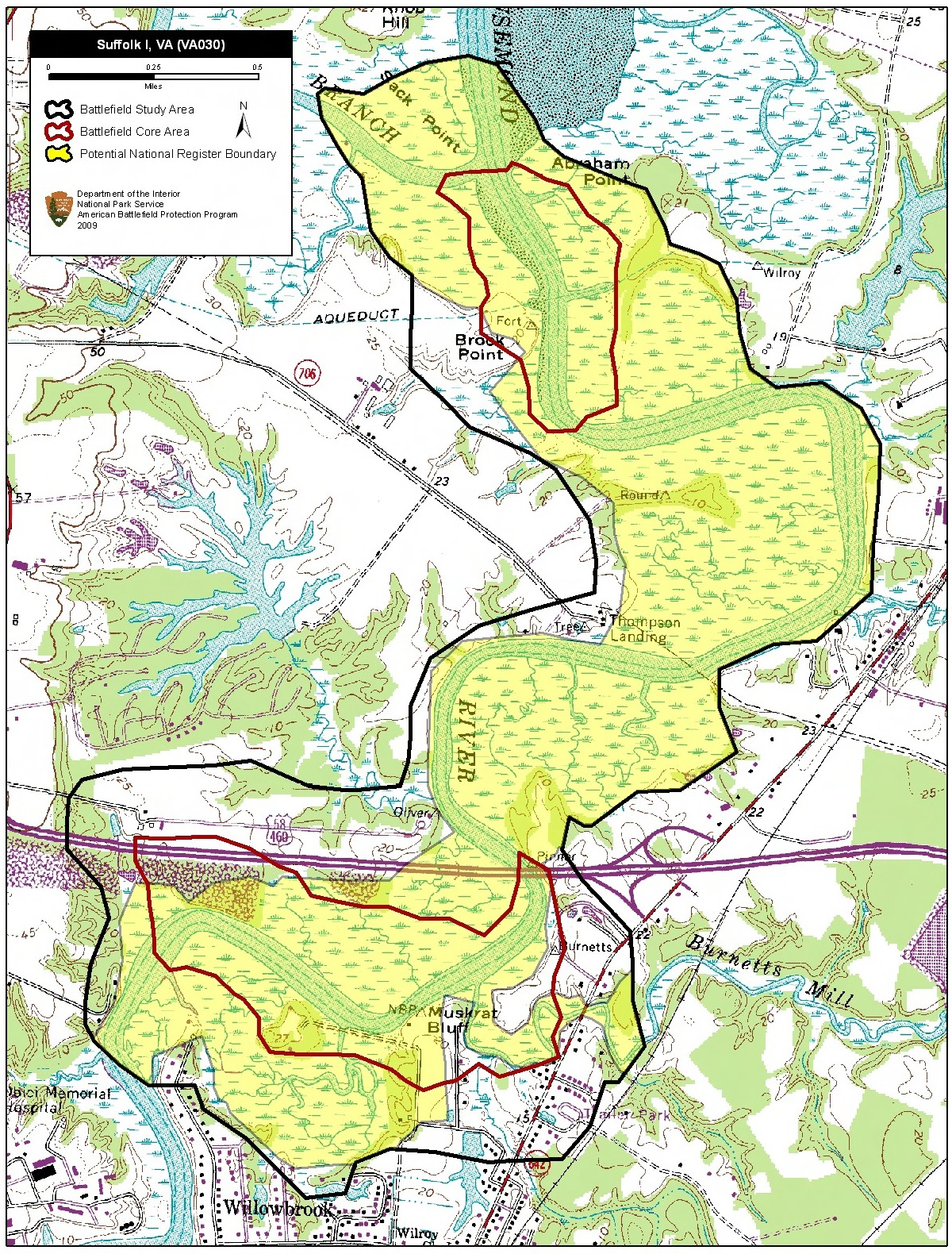
Map of battlefield core and study areas. The Study Area was expanded to accommodate a second Core Area that represents the Federal gunboat attack on April 14 against the Confederate battery at Hill’s Point.

=== Siege of Suffolk ===
In 1863, Lieutenant General James Longstreet was given command of the Confederate Department of North Carolina and Southern Virginia and was given several objectives, one of them being to capture the Union garrison at Suffolk. By that time, Longstreet initially had three divisions, but was reinforced by a fourth division by D.H. Hill. laid siege to Suffolk by early April. While besieging the garrison, the Confederates conducted raids and fortified their positions.

On April 13, the 166th, alongside the 167th Pennsylvania, 13th Indiana, and the 112th New York Infantry Regiment, was sent out as skirmishers, driving away Confederate skirmishers at Brothers' House on the Somerton Road and subsequently burning it. Col. Robert S. Foster then established a picket line stretching from Fort Union to Fort Nansemond. On April 15, Colonel Samuel P. Spear of the 11th Pennsylvania Cavalry led an unsuccessful attack on Confederate rifle pits alongside four companies from the 165th and 166th Pennsylvania. After failing to capture the Suffolk garrison, Longstreet's forces abandoned the siege in early May and rejoined Lee's Forces at the Rappahannock. During the siege, the 166th Pennsylvania lost 4 wounded and 1 captured.

=== Later service ===
After the siege, the 166th Pennsylvania participated in operations to break up the Seaboard & Roanoke Railroad. In early May, the regiment participated in a skirmish at Holland House, Carrsville, where the Confederates attempted to cut off Companies I and D, while they were on skirmish line, suffering 1 killed, 4 wounded, and 1 captured.

On June 27, the regiment moved to Fort Monroe, and then to White House Plantation, remaining there until July 2, where it took part in Dix's Peninsula Campaign to break up railroads at Hanover Junction. After the campaign, Dix's command returned to Yorktown, where the regiment was transported back to Washington, D.C., when its enlistment periods had almost expired.

The regiment was mustered out of service on July 28, at Harrisburg, returning with 630 men.

== Organizational affiliations, battle honors and detailed service ==
=== Organizational affiliations ===
During their service, the regiment was attached to various larger formations, such as:

- Attached to Foster's Brigade. Division at Suffolk, Va., 7th Corps, Dept. of Virginia, to April, 1863.
- 2nd Brigade, 1st Division, 7th Corps, to July 1863.

=== Battle honors ===
A list of battles the regiment participated in:

- Battle of Deserted House
- Action at Leesville
- Siege of Suffolk
- Skirmish at Holland House, Carrsville
- Dix's Peninsula Campaign

=== Detailed service ===
==== 1862 ====
- Organized at York October 24 to December 8, 1862.
- Moved to Washington, D.C., thence to Newport News and Suffolk, Va., December 8-17.

==== 1863 ====
- Duty at Suffolk till June, 1863.
- Expedition toward Blackwater January 8-10, 1863.
- Deserted House January 30. Leesville April 4.
- Siege of Suffolk April 11-May 4.
- Edenton, Providence Church and Somerton Roads April 12-13.
- Somerton Road April 15 and 20.
- Edenton Road April 24.
- Operations on Seaboard & Roanoke Railroad May 12-26.
- Holland House, Carrsville, May 15-16.
- Dix's Peninsula Campaign June 27-July 7.
- Expedition from White House to South Anna River July 1-7.
- South Anna Bridge July 4.
- Moved to Washington, D.C., July 8.
- Mustered out July 28, 1863.

== Casualties ==
The 166th Pennsylvania lost 6 men killed or mortally wounded, and 11 men by disease, aggregate 17.

== Commanders ==
- Colonel Andrew J. Fulton
- Lieutenant Colonel George W. Reisinger
- Major Joseph A. Renaut

== See also ==
- List of Pennsylvania Civil War regiments
- Pennsylvania in the Civil War
