= Ebenezer Skellie =

Recipient of the Medal of Honor

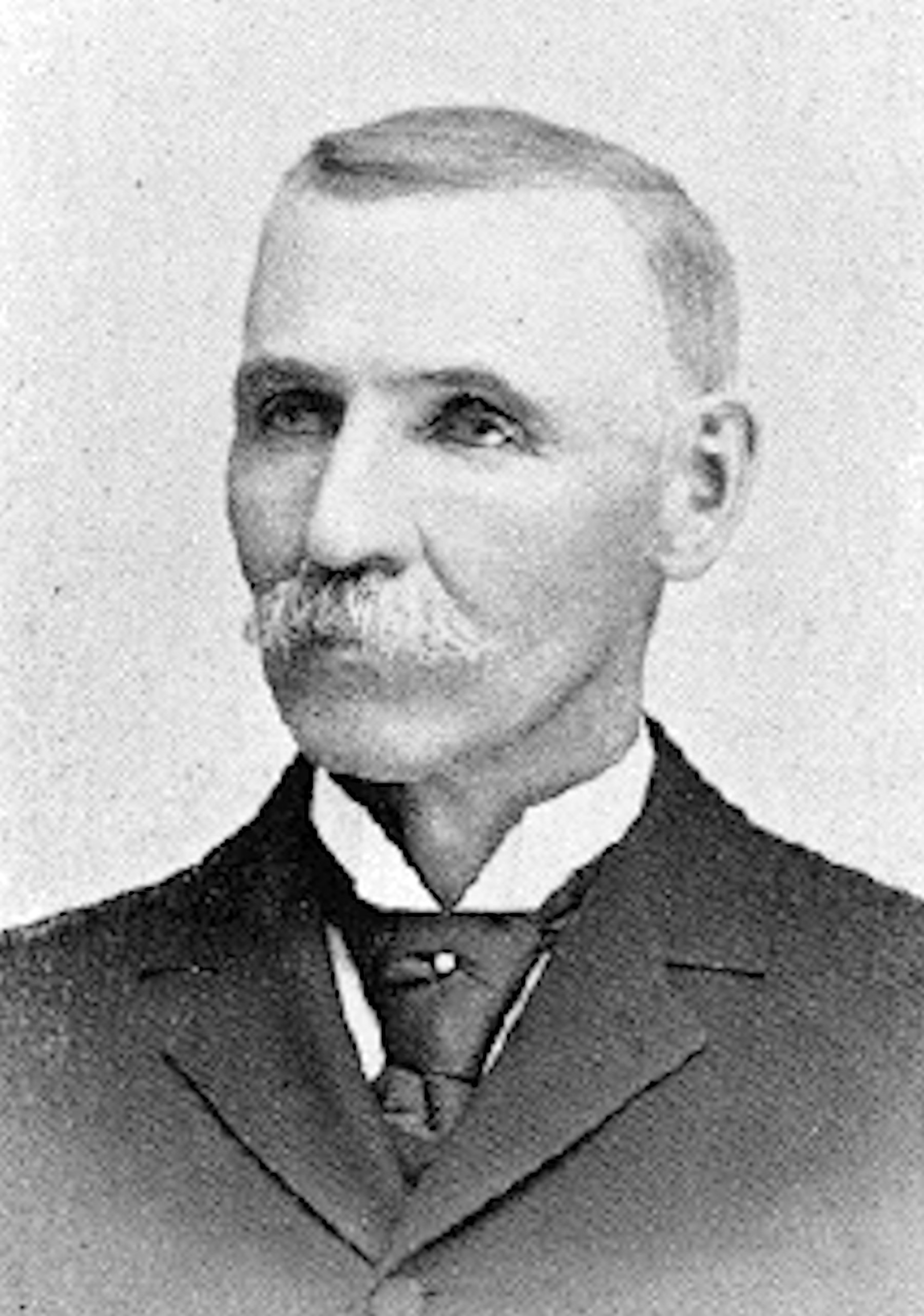
- Medal of Honor winner Ebenezer Skellie 1895
- Born: August 16, 1842; Mina, New York, United States
- Died: July 2, 1898; Mina, New York, United States
- Burial place: Mina Cemetery, Mina, New York
- Military career
- Allegiance: United States
- Branch: United States Army (Union)
- Service years: 1862 – 1865
- Rank: Second Lieutenant
- Unit: 112th New York Infantry
- Conflicts: American Civil War • Siege of Suffolk • Second Battle of Charleston Harbor • Bermuda Hundred Campaign • Battle of Cold Harbor • Siege of Petersburg • Second Battle of Petersburg • Battle of the Crater • Battle of Chaffin's Farm
- Awards: Medal of Honor

Ebenezer Skellie (August 16, 1842 – July 2, 1898) was a native of Chautauqua County, New York, who received his nation’s highest honor – the U.S. Medal of Honor – for the gallantry he displayed while fighting as a corporal with the 112th New York Volunteer Infantry's D Company in the Battle of Chaffin’s Farm during the American Civil War.

In the final decade of his life, he also became an active member of the Lakeside Assembly, a lifelong learning initiative similar to the Chautauqua movement of the 1890s and early 1900s. A member of the board of directors of this assembly from the time of its inception, and that board's second president, he helped to launch and expand Lakeside's educational offerings at Findley Lake, New York, during the late 19th century.

== Formative years ==
Born on August 16, 1842, in Mina, New York, near Findley Lake, Ebenezer Skellie was a son of New York native James Skellie (c. 1799 to 1853), a farmer and early settler of Chautauqua County, New York, and Jannett (Doig) Skellie (1806–1877), a native of East Greenwich, New York. In 1850, he resided in Mina with his parents and siblings: Sarah, Jane, Robert, Mary, James A., and Hannah (born respectively c. 1828, 1829, 1831,1836, 1837, and 1841).

Three years later, Skellie's home life changed considerably when his father died. By 1860, as one of the only two Skellie children still residing at home with his mother, he had become a primary breadwinner, according to that year's federal census, farming the family's land with his older brother James

== Civil War ==
He was 19-year-old when the Fort Sumter fell to the Confederate Army troops at the dawn of the American Civil War in mid-April 1861, Ebenezer Skellie continued to work on his family's farm and support his mother during the war's first year. Just over a year later, in response to calls from President Abraham Lincoln and the Governor of New York for additional volunteers to help preserve America's Union, Skellie enlisted for a three-year term of military service. Enrolling at Mina on August 9, 1862, he then officially mustered in for duty on August 15, at Camp Brown outside of Jamestown as a private with Company D of the 112th New York Volunteer Infantry.

Transported by the Atlantic and Great Western Railroad to Washington, D.C., with a stopover at Williamsport, Pennsylvania, Skellie was stationed briefly with his regiment at Fort Monroe before being shipped by steamer to Suffolk, Virginia, where his regiment was attached to the Union Army division commanded by Major-General John J. Peck. Finally issued guns and ammunition, they were then directed to pitch basic shelter tents on South Quay Road. Assigned to fatigue duty, they drilled regularly, and also dug rifle pits while battling their common camp ailment of dysentery. Ordered to march toward Franklin on November 17, the 112th New York Volunteers soon experienced their first true moment of combat. Marching quickly from 2 to 5 p.m. that day with Foster's Division in the advance, they took a 20-minute dinner break; continuing on, they marched until midnight when they took an additional 30-minute break. Making their way "through woods, swamps and mud holes" to reach "Zuni, a small town on the Blackwater river" at dawn, they joined with the 6th Massachusetts to force Confederate army skirmishers to cease operations.

Skellie's next major engagement with his regiment occurred during the Siege of Suffolk from April 11, to May 4, 1863. Stationed at "Fort Union", the Union's massive earthenworks strategically positioned between the Edenton and Summerton roads (and which the 112th had helped to construct while on fatigue duty), they exchanged fire with the enemy off and on as part of a larger, protracted duel between the opposing forces. As the struggle continued, casualties mounted — caused frequently by the minie balls fired by enemy sharpshooters. On April 25, five companies of the 112th New York skirmished at close quarters as part of a Union reconnoissance mission involving the 103rd and 169th New York regiments. Additional, intense skirmishing then ensued May 3, when the 112th New York was ordered to pursue the enemy as it retreated, and placed in the lead of Foster's brigade as it moved out on May 5. Capturing Confederate troops along their 12 miles (19 km) march to Quaker Church, Skellie and his comrades marched 3 miles (4.8 km) more to a wooded area, where they skirmished again. Capturing still more prisoners, they moved on to Howard's Corners, where they took a hour's break before returning to Leesville and then Suffolk.

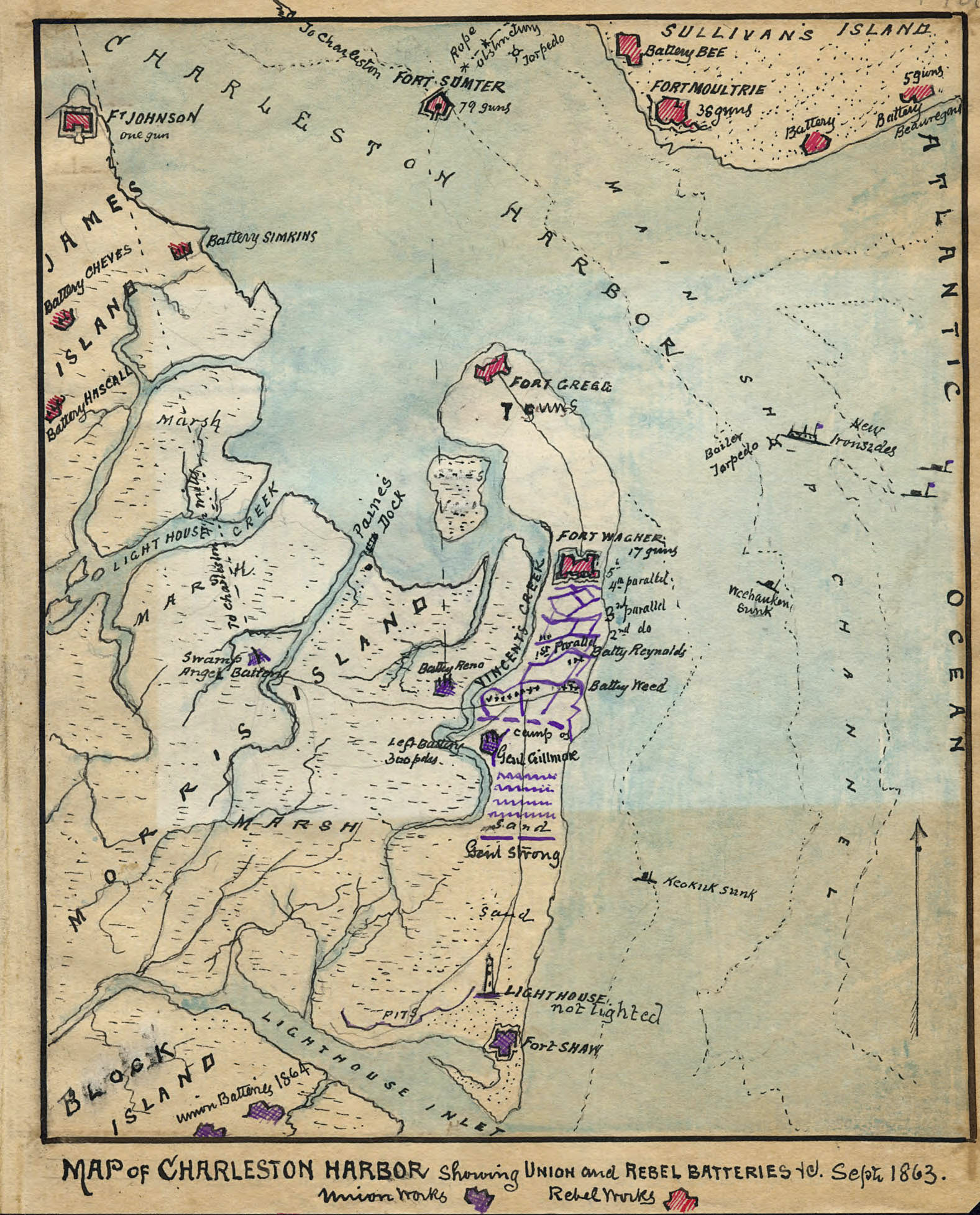
Union Army map, harbor positions of Brig.-Gen. Quincy A. Gilmore's troops, Charleston, South Carolina, September 1863.

Marched to the railroad station on June 27, he and his regiment were next transported to Norfolk, where they boarded the steamer John Brooks, sailed the York and Pamunky rivers, and disembarked at White House Landing. Encamping there briefly, they moved on to Hanover Court House where, after a brief rest on July 4, they continued on again, marching until midnight. Allowed to rest, they then retraced their steps after leaders determined that their position was untenable. Re-encamped at Taylor's plantation, they witnessed, firsthand, the abuse of slaves by the landowner there. Marched back to White House, they then moved down the peninsula, passing through Williamsburg en route to Yorktown. During the march, four members of the regiment died from sunstroke. Moving on to Big Bethel, Hampton, Portsmouth, and Bower's Hill, they remained there for several weeks before heading back to Fort Monroe. Divided in two, the 112th New York Volunteers then departed for Charleston, South Carolina, aboard steamers on August 3, and 4. Disembarking at Hilton Head roughly a week later, they were then transported aboard boats to Folly Island, where they disembarked at Pawnee Landing. Pitching their tents in a forested area on the island's eastern side, they were attached to the division commanded by Brigadier-General Israel Vodges in the U.S. Army's 10th Corps headed by Brigadier-General Quincy Adams Gillmore. Assigned to fatigue, guard and duties on Folly and Morris islands, the soldiers stationed here suffered frequently from dysentery, fevers and other ailments as they supported other Union troops in the Second Battle of Charleston Harbor through September 7, during which Fort Sumter was virtually reduced to rubble, Morris Island was captured, and Fort Wagner fell. Ordered to picket duty on Black Island on September 20, they periodically came under enemy fire while stationed here through the end of the month, and then spent October as a divided regiment with members spread around the various islands. On October 23, 1863, Skellie was promoted to the rank of corporal.

Ordered to John's Island with other Union troops on February 7, 1864, they briefly encountered enemy fire there before taking possession of the island. Four days later, they returned to Folly Island. On February 22, they received orders to head for Florida, "leaving tents and extra baggage". Transported via the Helen Getty and Ben Deford, they stopped at Stono inlet for the night, and then crossed the bar there in daylight to reach the mouth of the St. John's River. Steaming for Jacksonville, Florida, they disembarked there around noon, marched to a vacant field inside the city's boundaries, and began to erect earthenworks. A week later, they moved their camp to a site which was just outside of the city's business district and closer to the river. During this phase of duty, Skellie was honored by his superiors for service to the 112th New York by transfer, in March, within the regiment to the Color Guard, and assigned to protect the national and regimental colors.

Transported by the steamer Cossack to Hilton Head on April 20, the 112th New York Volunteers transferred to the larger Erricson at Port Royal and sailed for Hampton Roads, Virginia, where they arrived on May 3, to await orders. Transported to Gloucester Point, they disembarked and made camp. As part of the reorganization of the U.S. Army's 10th Corps, Skellie and his comrades were transferred to the Army of the James, and transported aboard the T. Powell to Bermuda Hundred where, beginning May 5, they became part of the Bermuda Hundred Campaign. Initially assigned to fatigue duty, they improved the Union Army's fortifications, skirmished with the enemy near the Petersburg & Richmond Railroad two days later, and then helped destroy a segment of that railroad on May 12. Ordered on to Walthall Junction that night, they were marched to the right side of the Union Army's main wing the next morning, where they remained until May 15. The next day, they were ordered to assist Brigadier-General Charles Adam Heckman's troops, who had been badly battered by a surprise, early morning Confederate attack. Heading to the position where they had been told Heckman's forces would be, confusion ensued when an officer riding on point (Lt. Col. E. P. Carpenter) ordered the regiment to fall back as he was fired upon. Quickly reformed into a line of battle by their regiment's commanding officer, Col. Jeremiah C. Drake, Skellie and other members of his regiment held off the enemy long enough for other Union regiments to remove their wounded. Later that day, they also helped drive the enemy back to their rifle pits before falling back behind the Union's entrenchments at Bermuda Hundred. Fending off three additional attacks by the enemy on May 19, they then continued to fend off additional attacks over the next 10 days, including a major assault on May 20. On May 26, they were commended for their gallantry by Brevet Lieutenant Colonel Godfrey Weitzel. Ordered to White House on May 28, they disembarked at West Point, and marched 15 miles (24 km) to reach their destination the next day. After a day's rest, they marched for Cold Harbor, and engaged in the intense combat operations there during the early part of June.

Arriving back in Bermuda Hundred on June 14, they marched for Point of Rocks, where the encamped overnight, and then resumed their march toward Petersburg, engaging in fighting with Confederate troops they met along the way on the north side of the James River as part of the Siege of Petersburg. Carrying the day, they then joined with other Union troops in the Second Battle of Petersburg. During a subsequent reorganization of the Union Army, they were reassigned from the 3rd Brigade to the U.S. Army's 18th Corps, 1st Brigade, 2nd Division under Col. N. M. Curtis. A week later, they were shifted from the army's extreme right to its left, near Hatcher's House. Under sudden enemy artillery attack on June 23, they moved behind the Union's breastworks at Bermuda Hundred, and then across the Appomattox River and on toward Petersburg after that fire was snuffed out by Union guns. Stationed to the left of the 18th Corps, they were assigned to defensive and fatigue duties. On July 30, Skellie and his fellow 112th New York Volunteers fought in the Battle of the Crater, an ultimately unsuccessful engagement which resulted in significant Union casualties. Withdrawn from the battle area, they moved on, spending the remainder of the month and most of August at Bermuda Hundred and at a site across the Appomattox River for much of September, venturing forth periodically from both locations for skirmishes and other assignments.

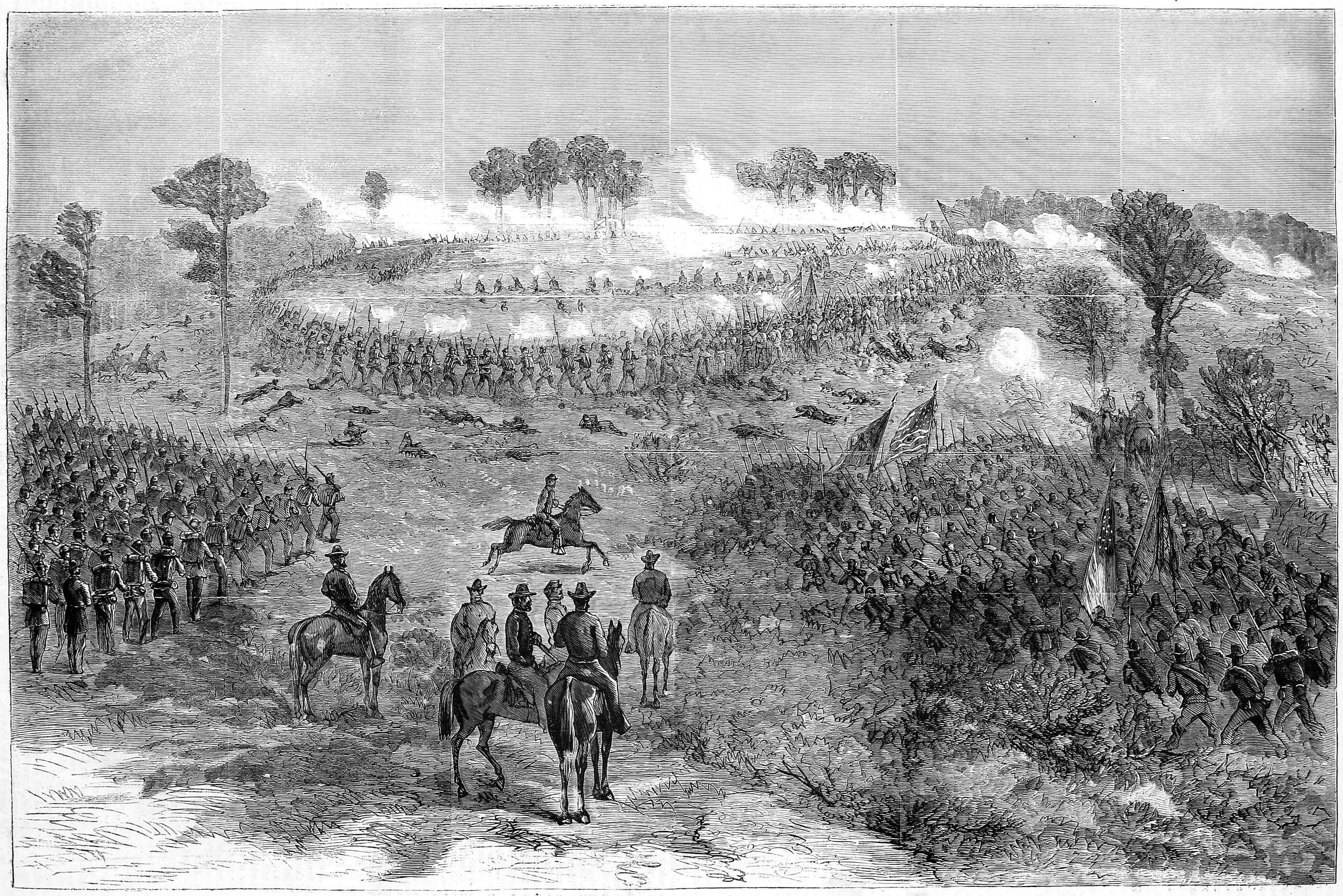
"Grant's Campaign - The Battle at Chapin's [sic] Farm, September 29, 1864 (Alfred Waud, Harper's Weekly).

On September 29, 1864, Skellie joined his regiment's list of casualties when he was seriously wounded in action during the Battle of Chaffin's Farm. After sustaining two gunshot wounds to the back and one to his leg, he was carried from the field of battle in a blanket to a field hospital nearby, where his injured leg was amputated. Subsequently transferred to the Central Park Hospital in New York City, he was recommended for promotion by brevet to second lieutenant while he was convalescing. Finally released from the hospital on June 24, 1865, he was then honorably discharged three days later. In his History of the One Hundred and Twelfth Regiment N.Y. Volunteers, penned in 1866, regimental chaplain Rev. William L. Hyde described how Skellie was felled:

On the 24th of September, the commands were withdrawn from the defenses [of the Union’s Division Headquarters near Petersburg], and camped about two miles in the rear, preparatory to a change….

Two days after, orders were received to reduce baggage to a minimum. At 3 o’clock the 1st Brigade took up the march under the temporary command of Col. R. S. Dagget, 117th N.Y. After a long and tedious march … the column found itself [moving] towards Deep Bottom, on the James River…. Across the river was a bridge of boats, and on the other side a high bluff well entrenched, and crowned by a formidable redoubt. It was half past two on the morning of the 29th when the commands reached their halting place, just beyond the redoubt…. Soon after the halt, orders came for the men to be roused at half past three, make coffee, and be prepared to march…. The command moved out about 4 o’clock…. The Division was now under the command of Brig. Gen. R. S. Foster…. After advancing about one mile, it was placed in position along a road crossing the New Market Road, in reserve. The 3d U.S.C. Troops, of the 18th Corps, were now moving forward in front as skirmishers, to drive the enemy from a skirt of woods which they held. Soon the firing became lively; with a yell the colored boys rushed on, and drove the rebels back to their breastworks. The main line now passed on through the woods. The firing now became brisker. In half an hour we heard loud and reiterated cheers. The colored boys had carried the works before them, and were pressing on after the fugitive foe. Their loss, however, was fearful. The ground over which they passed was strewn with the slain, and the wounded soon filled a large plantation house in the rear, and the large enclosure surrounding it. The next line of works was five miles in advance. The whole command moved rapidly forward. Near New Market Hall, Foster’s Division was put in position for a charge. The 112th and 3d N.Y. were in the advanced line of the 2d Brigade, and there were two supporting lines in the rear. They were now in a piece of woods…. Suddenly volleys of grape and cannister came tearing through the trees, from a field battery planted on elevated ground in front…. [A]s the men moved forward, the enemy [fled; two hours later], they were ordered to advance and storm Fort Gilmor, a redoubt, in front…. Maj. Ludwick, on receiving the order, drew his sword with his left hand, his right being entirely disabled, and on foot with his men, went forward. On passing out of the wood, they had a fourth of a mile to pass over before reaching the Fort. The intervening ground was broken, two ravines were to be crossed, and there was a slashing of a timber two-thirds of the distance, then and open corn field in front of the Fort. The line of earth works from this Fort on either side, extended in such form that when the corn field was reached, the men were exposed to an enfilading fire. Gallantly they pressed on, and were met by a murderous fire as they toiled through the slashing [and multiple men from the 112th New York began to fall, dead or grievously wounded]. The color guard was severely cut up….

The result of the day was an impregnable position six miles from Richmond, the command of the river a mile above Aiken’s Landing, also Fort Harrison, an immensely strong redoubt.

== Post-war life ==
Returning home to Chautauqua County following his release from the hospital and honorable discharge from the military, Ebenezer Skellie resumed his life on the family farm in Mina, where he resided alone with his mother.

Married to Pennsylvania native Sarah J. Pullman (1845–1924) by the Rev. W. L. Hyde on October 11, 1865, he and his wife greeted the births of two daughters: Lettie (1866–1867), who died in early childhood and was laid to rest at the Mina Cemetery; and Minnie (1868–1894), who was born on November 7, 1868, and went on to marry H. Reed Weaver. By 1870, Ebenezer Skellie was residing with his wife and surviving daughter in Mina, where he was a successful farmer with real estate and personal property valued at $6,400. In 1875, the New York Census documented that the Skellie household was a two-income one with Sarah Skellie bringing in funds from her work as a seamstress to supplement what her husband earned as a farmer. He was also active politically during this time, serving as a member of Mina's board of supervisors from 1878 to 1882.

In addition, he operated a lumber mill in Findley Lake, New York, but sold his principal site there to the Swartz family in 1892, according to historian Randy Boerst. Two years later, tragedy struck the family. In 1894, just five weeks after Ebenezer Skellie’s daughter, Minnie (Skellie) Weaver, fell ill, she succumbed to complications from her illness while staying with her parents at the lake.

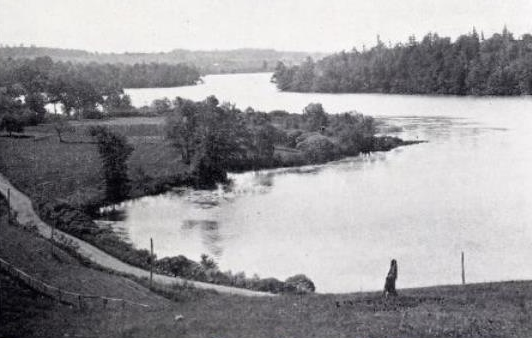
Findley Lake, Chautauqua County, New York, circa 1904.)

The next year, Skellie became involved with Chautauqua, an educational movement launched during the late 19th century to inspire lifelong learning among adults by offering free to low cost cultural, scientific and spiritual programs in communities across America. A member of the movement's Lakeside Assembly at Findley Lake, he served on that assembly's first board of directors, according to Boerst:

The season lasted for four weeks in August throughout the 20 years of existence [from 1895 to 1915]. Admission was 10 [cents] a day or $1.50 for a season pass the first year.... After a successful first season, a stock company was formed and a board of directors as elected to take charge of the assembly.... The first board of directors included Dr. F. E. Lilley, J. J. Brookmire, Volney White, J. A. Hill, Ebenezer Skellie, Rev. R. J. White, Delmer Beebe, Louis Swartz, Rev. C. G. Langdon, Walter Sperry, and A. F. Stanley.

After the assembly's first president (Lilly) moved to California, Skellie was appointed as the organization's second president. As the initiative grew in popularity, "cottages were built on both sides of the lake", and the lake area became "a center of culture, religious sentiment, and temperance." Crowds of up to 2,000 adults "would pack into a barnlike auditorium ... to hear the most eminent speakers, gifted musicians, and performers of the day."

== Death and interment ==
Four years after the death of his only child, Ebenezer Skellie also died. Reportedly, as he lay dying at his home at Findley Lake on July 2, 1898, his final words were: "I see Minnie. Move my chair down a little closer to the edge of the river, so I can step over." He was then laid to rest at the same cemetery where his two children and parents were interred.

== Medal of Honor citation ==
Ebenezer Skellie was recognized for his service to the nation when the federal government presented him with the U.S. Medal of Honor on April 6, 1865. According to Military Times, his citation contained the following information:

"The President of the United States of America, in the name of Congress, takes pleasure in presenting the Medal of Honor to Corporal Ebenezer Skellie, United States Army, for extraordinary heroism on 29 September 1864, while serving with Company D, 112th New York Infantry, in action at Chapin's Farm [sic], Virginia. Corporal Skellie took the colors of his regiment, the Color Bearer having fallen, and carried them through the first charge; also, in the second charge, after all the color guards had been killed or wounded he carried the colors up to the enemy's works, where he fell wounded."

Date of Action: September 29, 1864
Date of Award: April 6, 1865
Service: Army
Rank: Corporal
Company: Company D
Division: 112th New York Infantry

== See also ==
- List of Medal of Honor recipients
- List of American Civil War Medal of Honor recipients: Q–S
