= Patrick H. Doody =

- Born: July 7, 1840; Ireland
- Died: March 5, 1924 (aged 83); Woodside, New York
- Burial place: Calvary Cemetery
- Military career
- Allegiance: United States of America
- Branch: United States Army; Union Army
- Service years: 1862 - 1865
- Rank: First Sergeant
- Unit: (New York (state)) 164th New York Volunteer Infantry - Company E
- Conflicts: Battle of Cold Harbor
- Awards: Medal of Honor

Patrick H. Doody (July 7, 1840 – March 5, 1924) was an Irish soldier who fought in the American Civil War. Doody received the United States' highest award for bravery during combat, the Medal of Honor, for his action during the Battle of Cold Harbor in Virginia on June 7, 1864. He was honored with the award on December 13, 1893.

== Biography ==
Doody was born in Ireland on July 7, 1840. He joined the 164th New York Infantry in August 1862, and mustered out with his regiment in July 1865. He died on March 5, 1924. His remains are interred at the Calvary Cemetery in New York.

== Medal of Honor citation ==
After making a successful personal reconnaissance, he gallantly led the skirmishers in a night attack, charging the enemy, and thus enabling the pioneers to put up works.

== See also ==
- List of American Civil War Medal of Honor recipients: A–F
