= 164th New York Infantry Regiment =

- Active: September 1862 to July 15, 1865
- Country: United States
- Allegiance: Union
- Branch: Infantry
- Size: 928
- Engagements: Battle of Deserted House; Siege of Suffolk; Battle of Spotsylvania Court House; Battle of Totopotomoy Creek; Battle of Cold Harbor; Siege of Petersburg; Second Battle of Petersburg; Battle of Jerusalem Plank Road; Second Battle of Deep Bottom; Second Battle of Ream's Station; Battle of Hatcher's Run; Battle of Watkins' House; Appomattox Campaign; Battle of Sailor's Creek; Battle of Appomattox Court House

The 164th New York Infantry Regiment was an infantry regiment in the Union Army during the American Civil War.

== Service ==
The 164th New York Infantry, a Zouave unit, was organized at New York City, New York, in September and October 1862. It was reorganized at Newport News, Virginia, and mustered on November 19, 1862, under the command of Colonel John Eugene McMahon. It was one of the four regiments forming the brigade of Irish soldiers known as the Corcoran Legion.

The regiment was attached to District of Newport News, Virginia, Department of Virginia, to December 1862. Corcoran's Brigade, Division of Suffolk, VII Corps, Department of Virginia, to April 1863. 3rd Brigade, 1st Division, VII Corps, to July 1863. Corcoran's Brigade, King's Division, XXII Corps, Department of Washington, to November 1863. 1st Brigade, Corcoran's Division, XXII Corps, to December 1863. 2nd Brigade, Tyler's Division, XXII Corps, to May 1864. 4th Brigade, 2nd Division, II Corps, Army of the Potomac, to June 1864. 2nd Brigade, 2nd Division, II Corps, to July 1865.

The 164th New York Infantry mustered out of service July 15, 1865.

== Detailed service ==
- Left New York for Newport News, Virginia, November 6, 1862.
- Duty at Newport News, Va., until December 1862, and at Suffolk, Virginia, until May 1863.
  - Action at Deserted House, Va., January 30, 1863.
- Siege of Suffolk April 12-May 4.
  - Edenton Road April 15 and 24.
  - Providence Church Road, Nansemond River, May 3.
  - Siege of Suffolk raised May 4.
- Blackwater May 12 and June 17.
- Dix's Peninsula Campaign June 24-July 7.
- Moved to Washington, D.C., July 12. Provost duty in the defenses of that city, and at Alexandria, Va., and guard duty on the Orange & Alexandria Railroad until May 1864.
- Ordered to join the Army of the Potomac in the field May 1864.
- Rapidan Campaign May 17 to June 15.
  - Spotsylvania Court House, Va., May 17–21.
  - North Anna River May 23–26.
  - On line of the Pamunkey May 26–28.
  - Totopotomoy May 28–31.
  - Cold Harbor June 1–12.
- Before Petersburg June 16–18.
  - Siege of Petersburg June 16, 1864, to April 2, 1865.
- Jerusalem Plank Road, Weldon Railroad, June 22–23, 1864.
- Demonstration on north side of James River July 27–29. Deep Bottom July 27–28.
- Demonstration north of James River August 13–20.
  - Strawberry Plains, Deep Bottom, August 14–18.
- Ream's Station August 25.
- Boydton Plank Road, Hatcher's Run, October 27–28.
- Dabney's Mills, Hatcher's Run, February 5–7, 1865.
- Watkins' House March 25.
- Appomattox Campaign March 28-April 9.
  - Boydton Road March 30–31.
  - Crow's House March 31.
  - Fall of Petersburg April 2.
  - Pursuit of Lee April 3–9.
    - Sailor's Creek April 6.
    - High Bridge, Farmville, April 7.
    - Appomattox Court House April 9.
- Surrender of Lee and his army. At Burkesville until May 2.
- March to Washington, D.C., May 2–12.
- Grand Review of the Armies May 23.
- Duty at Washington until July.

== Gallery ==
The 164th New York served on Guard Duty on the Alexandria Railroad and in the defenses of Washington from July 1863 till May 1864. While there, they, along with the 170th New York, were photographed extensively by Matthew Brady's photographers from November 1863 till April 1864 in a series featuring their Campsites and Fortifications they had built such as the block Houses on the O&ARR. These are just some of the photos they took.

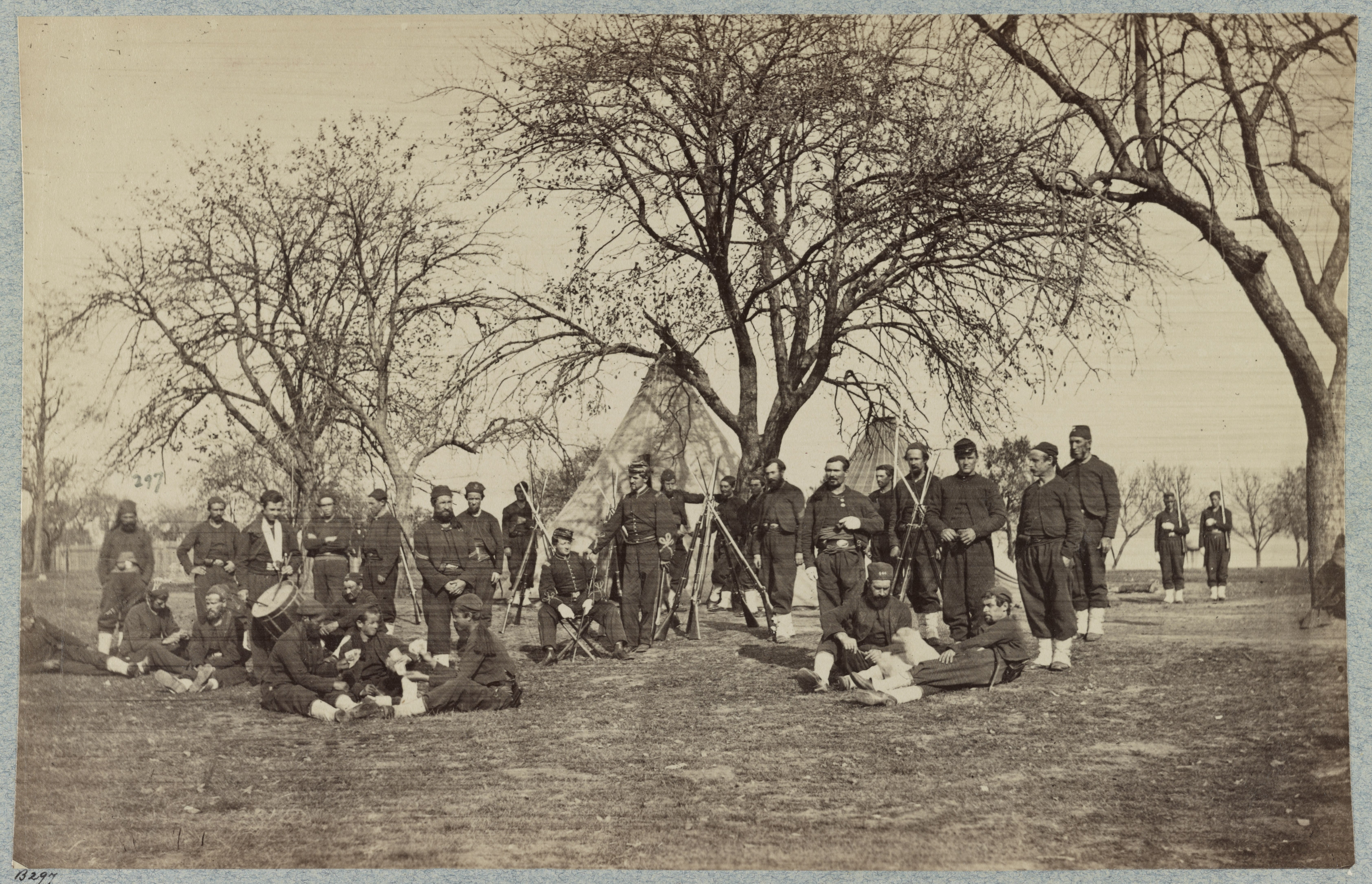
Co. - , 164th New York Infantry

Guard Mount, 164th New York Infantry

Officers of 164th New York Infantry

Headquarters of 164th New York Infantry

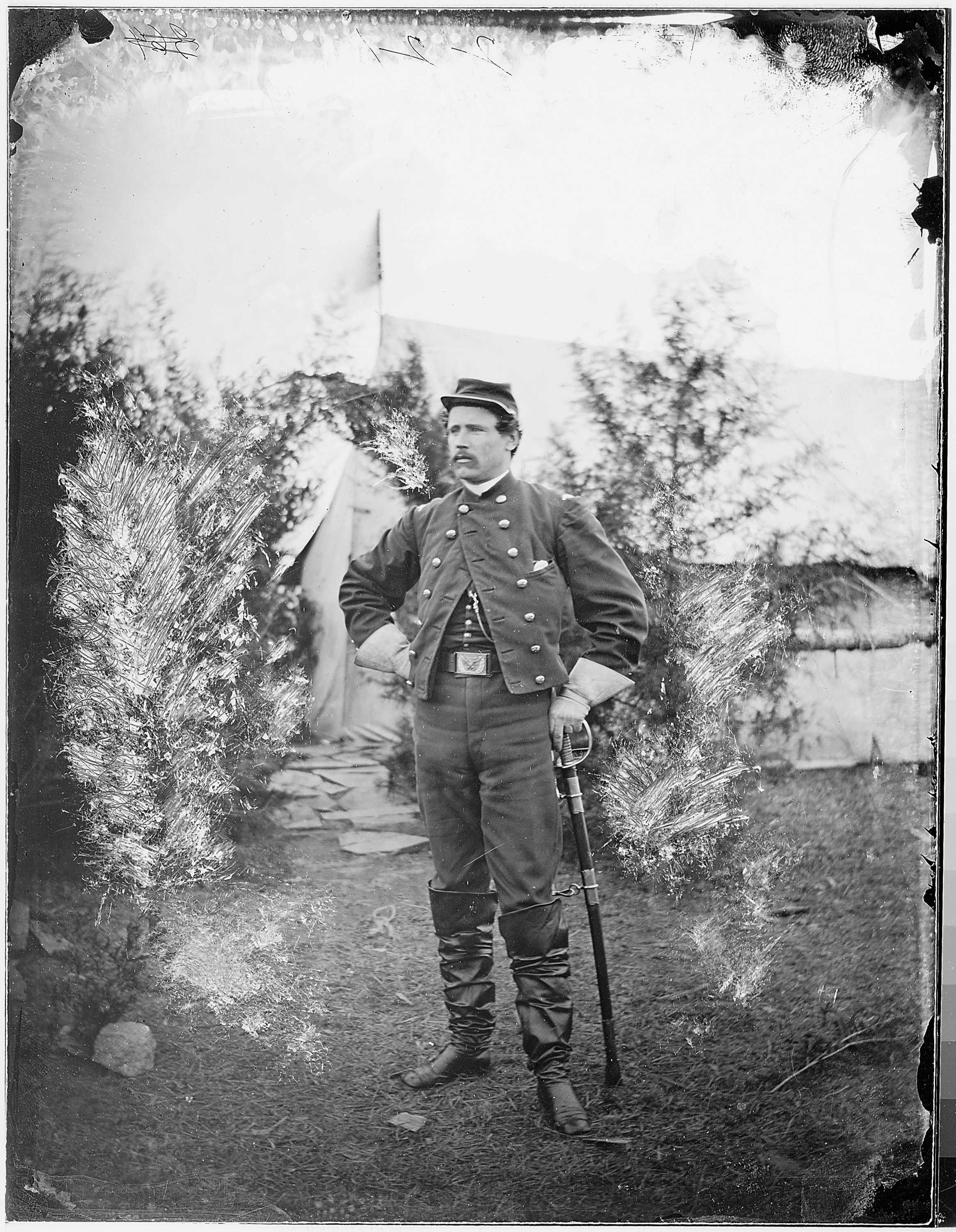
Colonel James Power McMahon, 164th New York Infantry.

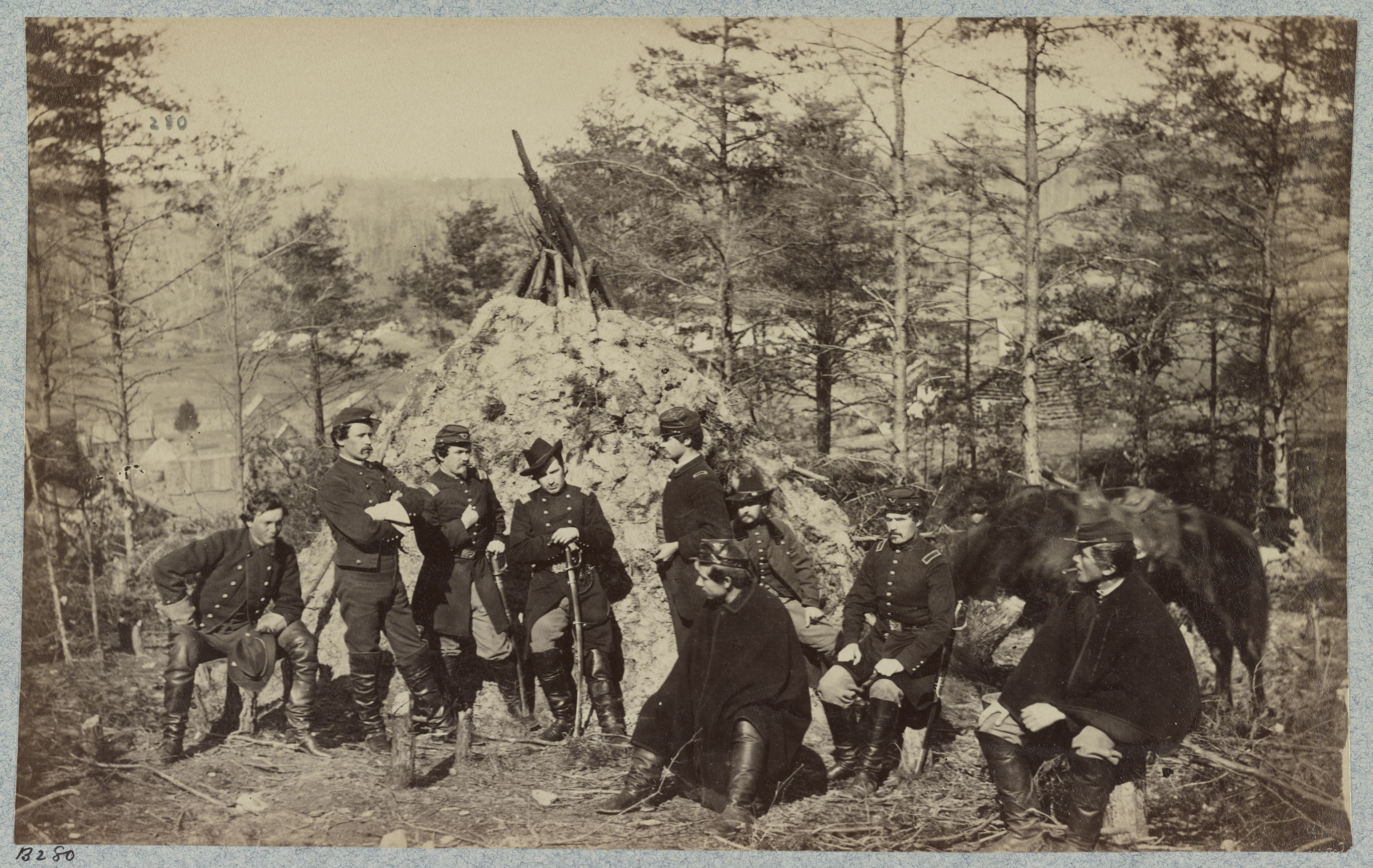
Officers of 164th and 170th New York Infantry

Surgeons of 164th New York Infantry

== Casualties ==
The regiment lost a total of 245 men during service; 10 officers and 106 enlisted men killed or mortally wounded, 3 officers and 126 enlisted men died of disease. 26% of the men who served would die during the regiment's time of service.

== Commanders ==
- Colonel John Eugene McMahon – died March 3, 1863, at Buffalo, New York, due to disease
- Colonel James Power McMahon – killed in action at Cold Harbor, June 3, 1864
- Colonel William DeLacy
- Major John Beattie - commanded the regiment at the First Battle of Deep Bottom
- Captain Timothy J. Burke - commanded the regiment during the Appomattox Campaign

== Notable members ==
- Sergeant John Brosnan, Company E - Medal of Honor recipient for action at the Second Battle of Petersburg
- 1st Sergeant Patrick H. Doody, Company E - Medal of Honor recipient for action at the Battle of Cold Harbor, June 7, 1864

== See also ==
- List of New York Civil War regiments
- New York in the Civil War
