= Siege of Suffolk order of battle: Confederate =

The following Confederate Army units and commanders fought in the Siege of Suffolk of the American Civil War. The Union order of battle is listed separately.

== Abbreviations used ==
=== Military rank ===
- LTG = Lieutenant General
- MG = Major General
- BG = Brigadier General
- Col = Colonel
- Ltc = Lieutenant Colonel
- Maj = Major
- Cpt = Captain
- Lt = Lieutenant

=== Other ===
- (w) = wounded
- (mw) = mortally wounded
- (k) = killed in action
- (c) = captured

== Department of North Carolina and Southern Virginia ==
LTG James Longstreet, Commanding

=== Infantry and Artillery ===
Division	Brigade	Regiments
Pickett's Division; MG George E. Pickett	Armistead's Brigade BG Lewis A. Armistead	9th Virginia: Maj John C. Owens; 14th Virginia: Col James G. Hodges; 38th Virginia: Col Edward C. Edmonds; 53rd Virginia: Col William R. Aylett; 57th Virginia: Col John B. Magruder
Pickett's Division; MG George E. Pickett	Corse's Brigade BG Montgomery D. Corse	15th Virginia: Col Thomas P. August; 17th Virginia: Maj Robert H. Simpson; 30th Virginia: Col Archibald T. Harrison; 32nd Virginia: Col Edgar B. Montague
Pickett's Division; MG George E. Pickett	Kemper's Brigade BG James L. Kemper	1st Virginia: Col Lewis B. Williams, Jr.; 3rd Virginia: Col Joseph Mayo, Jr.; 7th Virginia: Col Waller T. Patton; 11th Virginia: Maj Kirkwood Otey; 24th Virginia: Col William R. Terry
Pickett's Division; MG George E. Pickett	Garnett's Brigade BG Richard B. Garnett	8th Virginia: Col Eppa Hunton; 18th Virginia: Ltc Henry A. Carrington; 19th Virginia: Col Henry Gantt; 28th Virginia: Col Robert C. Allen; 56th Virginia: Col William D. Stuart
Pickett's Division; MG George E. Pickett	Dearing's Artillery Battalion Maj James Dearing	Fauquier (Virginia) Artillery: Cpt Robert M. Stribling; Hampden (Virginia) Artillery: Cpt William H. Caskie; Latham (Virginia) Artillery: Cpt Joseph G. Blount; Richmond Fayette (Virginia) Artillery: Cpt Miles C. Macon; Confederate Guards (Mississippi) Artillery: Cpt William D. Bradford
Hood's Division; MG John B. Hood	Law's Brigade BG Evander M. Law	4th Alabama: Ltc Laurence H. Scruggs; 15th Alabama: Maj William C. Oates; 44th Alabama: Ltc John H. Jones; 47th Alabama: Col James W. Jackson; 48th Alabama: Col James L. Sheffield
Hood's Division; MG John B. Hood	Robertson's Brigade BG Jerome B. Robertson	3rd Arkansas: Col Van H. Manning; 1st Texas: Ltc Philip A. Work; 4th Texas: Col John C. G. Key; 5th Texas: Col Robert M. Powell
Hood's Division; MG John B. Hood	Anderson's Brigade BG George T. Anderson	7th Georgia: Col William W. White; 8th Georgia: Col John R. Towers; 9th Georgia: Col John C. Mounger; 11th Georgia: Col Francis H. Little; 59th Georgia: Col William A. J. Brown
Hood's Division; MG John B. Hood	Benning's Brigade BG Henry L. Benning	2nd Georgia: Ltc William T. Harris; 15th Georgia: Col Dudley M. Du Bose; 17th Georgia: Col Wesley C. Hodges; 20th Georgia: Col John A. Jones
Hood's Division; MG John B. Hood	Henry's Artillery Battalion Maj Mathias W. Henry	Rowan (North Carolina) Artillery, Reilly's battery; Gatlin (North Carolina) Artillery, Lane's battery; German (South Carolina) Light Artillery, Bachman's battery; Palmetto (South Carolina) Light Artillery, Garden's battery
French's Division; MG Samuel G. French	Jenkins' Brigade BG Micah Jenkins	1st South Carolina (Hagood's); 2nd South Carolina (Rifles): Col Thomas Thompson; 5th South Carolina: Col Asbury Coward; 6th South Carolina: Col John Bratton; Hampton's Legion: Col Martin W. Gary; Palmetto Sharpshooters: Col Joseph Walker
French's Division; MG Samuel G. French	Davis' Brigade BG Joseph R. Davis	2nd Mississippi; 11th Mississippi; 42nd Mississippi: Col. Hugh R. Miller; 55th North Carolina: Col John K. Connally
French's Division; MG Samuel G. French	Shumaker's Artillery Battalion Maj Lindsay M. Shumaker	Chesterfield (South Carolina) Artillery: Cpt James C. Coit; Alexandria (Virginia) Artillery: Cpt David L. Smoot; Martin's (Virginia) battery: Cpt S. T. Martin; Sturdivant's (Virginia) battery: Cpt Nathaniel A. Sturdivant

=== Cavalry ===
Brigade	Regiments and Others
Baker's Brigade Col John A. Baker	2nd North Carolina; 3rd North Carolina; 4th North Carolina: Col Dennis D. Ferbee
