= 182nd New York Infantry Regiment =

- Active: November 1862 to July 15, 1865
- Country: United States
- Allegiance: Union
- Branch: Infantry
- Size: 1512
- Engagements: Battle of Deserted House; Siege of Suffolk; Battle of Spotsylvania Court House; Battle of Totopotomoy Creek; Battle of Cold Harbor; Siege of Petersburg; Second Battle of Petersburg; Battle of Jerusalem Plank Road; Second Battle of Deep Bottom; Second Battle of Ream's Station; Battle of Hatcher's Run; Battle of Watkins' House; Appomattox Campaign; Battle of Sailor's Creek; Battle of High Bridge; Battle of Appomattox Court House

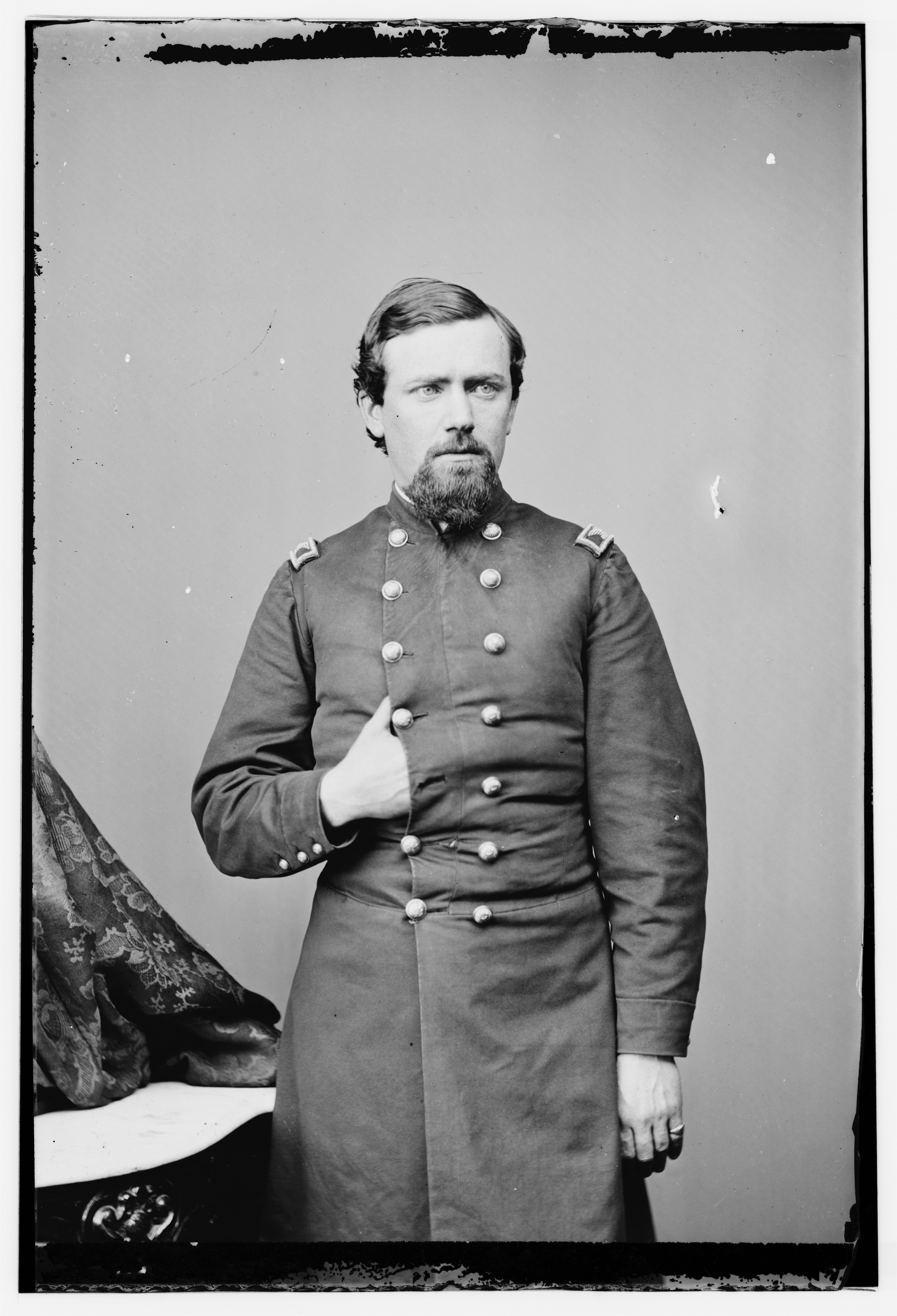
Colonel Mathew Murphy, 182nd N.Y. Inf.

The 182nd New York Infantry Regiment was an infantry regiment in the Union Army during the American Civil War.

== Service ==
The 182nd New York Volunteer Infantry, also known as the 69th New York National Guard Artillery, was the first regiment of Corcoran's Irish Legion and saw service in the U.S. Civil War from 1862 to 1865. The Regiment, which was formed by Irish-American immigrants affiliated with the Fenian Brotherhood, was the second of two volunteer regiments formed by members of New York's Irish-American 69th New York State Militia, the other being the 69th New York Volunteers of Meagher's Irish Brigade.

The regiment was organized at New York City, New York in November 1862 and mustered in under the command of Colonel Mathew Murphy. Many of the men who enlisted were serving in the 69th New York State Militia.

The regiment was attached to Newport News, Virginia, Department of Virginia, to December 1862. Corcoran's Brigade, Division at Suffolk, VII Corps, Department of Virginia, to April 1863. 3rd Brigade, 1st Division, VII Corps, to July 1863. Corcoran's Brigade, King's Division, XXII Corps, Department of Washington, to November 1863. 1st Brigade, Corcoran's Division, XXII Corps, to December 1863. 2nd Brigade, Tyler's Division, XXII Corps, to May 1864. 4th Brigade, 2nd Division, II Corps, Army of the Potomac, to June 1864. 2nd Brigade, 2nd Division, II Corps, to July 1865.

The 182nd New York Infantry mustered out of service July 15, 1865.

== Detailed service ==
- Left New York for Newport News, Virginia, November 10, 1862.
- Duty at Newport News, Va., until December 1862, and at Suffolk until May 1863.
- Action at Deserted House, Va., January 30, 1863.
- Siege of Suffolk April 12-May 4.
  - Attack on Suffolk April 24. Nansemond River May 3.
- Siege of Suffolk raised May 4.
- Operations on Seaboard & Roanoke Railroad May 12–26.
  - Holland House, Carrsville, May 15–16.
- Dix's Peninsula Campaign June 24-July 7.
- Moved to Washington, D.C., July 12, and duty in and about the defenses of that city and guard duty along Orange & Alexandria Railroad until May 1864.
- Ordered to join the Army of the Potomac in the field May 1864.
- Rapidan Campaign May 17-June 15.
  - Spotsylvania Court House May 17–21.
  - North Anna River May 28-26.
  - On line of the Pamunkey May 26–28.
  - Totopotomoy Creek May 28–31.
  - Cold Harbor June 1–12.
- Before Petersburg June 16–18.
- Siege of Petersburg June 16, 1864, to April 2, 1865.
  - Jerusalem Plank Road, Weldon Railroad, June 22–23, 1864.
  - Demonstration north of the James July 27–29.
  - Deep Bottom July 27–28.
  - Demonstration north of the James August 13–20.
  - Strawberry Plains, Deep Bottom, August 14–18.
  - Ream's Station August 25.
  - Boydton Plank Road, Hatcher's Run, October 27–28.
  - Dabney's Mills, Hatcher's Run, February 5–7, 1865.
  - Watkins' House March 25.
- Appomattox Campaign March 28-April 9.
  - Boydton and White Oak Road March 29–31.
  - Crow's House March 31.
  - Fall of Petersburg April 2.
  - Pursuit of Lee April 3–9.
    - Sailor's Creek April 6.
    - High Bridge, Farmville, April 7.
    - Appomattox Court House April 9.
  - Surrender of Lee and his army.
- At Burkesville until May 2.
- March to Washington, D.C., May 2–12.
- Grand Review of the Armies May 23.
- Duty at Washington until July.

== Casualties ==
The regiment lost a total of 126 men during service; 8 officers and 65 enlisted men killed or mortally wounded, 53 enlisted men died of disease.

== Commanders ==
- Colonel Mathew Murphy - mortally wounded in action at Hatcher's Run; died April 16, 1865
- Lieutenant Colonel Thomas M. Reid - commanded during the Siege of Suffolk
- Capt. Edward K. Butler https://www.loc.gov/item/2018669391/

== See also ==
- List of New York Civil War regiments
- New York in the Civil War
