= 112th New York Infantry Regiment =

- Active: September 11, 1862 to June 13, 1865
- Country: United States
- Allegiance: Union
- Branch: Infantry
- Engagements: Siege of Suffolk; Battle of Drewry's Bluff; Battle of Cold Harbor; Siege of Petersburg; Second Battle of Petersburg; Battle of the Crater; Battle of Chaffin's Farm; Battle of Fair Oaks & Darbytown Road; First Battle of Fort Fisher; Second Battle of Fort Fisher; Carolinas campaign

The 112th New York Infantry Regiment was an infantry regiment in the Union Army during the American Civil War.

== Service ==
The 112th New York Infantry was organized at Jamestown, New York and mustered in for three years service on September 11, 1862 under the command of Colonel Jeremiah C. Drake.

The regiment was attached to Foster's Provisional Brigade, Division at Suffolk, VII Corps, Department of Virginia, to December 1862. Gibbs' Provisional Brigade, Division at Suffolk, VII Corps, to April 1863. 2nd Brigade, 1st Division, VII Corps, to July 1863. Foster's Brigade, Vodges' Division, Folly Island, South Carolina, X Corps, Department of the South, to February 1864. 1st Brigade, Vodges' Division, District of Florida, to April 1864. 2nd Brigade, 3rd Division, X Corps, Army of the James, Department of Virginia and North Carolina, to May 1864. 2nd Brigade, 3rd Division, XVIII Corps, to July 1864. 1st Brigade, 2nd Division, X Corps, to December 1864, 1st Brigade, 2nd Division, XXIV Corps, to January 1865. 1st Brigade, 2nd Division, Terry's Provisional Corps, Department of North Carolina, to March 1865. 1st Brigade, 2nd Division, X Corps, Army of the Ohio, Department of North Carolina, to June 1865.

The 112th New York Infantry mustered out of service June 13, 1865. Recruits and veterans were transferred to the 3rd New York Infantry.

== Detailed service ==
Left New York for Fort Monroe, Va., September 12, then moved to Suffolk September 16, 1862. Duty at Suffolk, Va., September 1862 to June 1863. Expedition toward Blackwater January 7–9, 1863. Action at Deserted House, Va., January 30, 1863. Leesville April 4. Siege of Suffolk, Va., April 12-May 4. Edenton, Providence Church, and Somerton Roads April 12–13. Edenton Road April 15 and 24. Nansemond River May 3. Siege of Suffolk raised May 4. Dix's Peninsula Campaign June 24-July 7. Expedition from White House to South Anna Bridge July 1–7. South Anna Bridge July 4. Near Portsmouth July 10–28. Ordered to the Department of the South, arriving at Folly Island, S.C., August 12. Duty at Folly and Black Islands and operations against Charleston until February 1864. Expedition to John's and James Islands February 6–14. Ordered to Jacksonville, Fla., February 20, and duty there until April 21. Ordered to Yorktown, Va., April 21. Butler's operations on south side of the James River and against Petersburg and Richmond May 4–28. Occupation of City Point and Bermuda Hundred May 5. Port Walthal Junction, Chester Station, May 6–7. Operations against Fort Darling May 12–16. Battle of Drury's Bluff May 14–16. Bermuda Hundred May 16–27. Moved to White House, then to Cold Harbor May 27–31. Battles about Cold Harbor June 1–12. Before Petersburg June 15–18. Siege operations against Petersburg and Richmond June 16-December 7, 1864. Duty in trenches before Petersburg and on the Bermuda Hundred front until September 27. Action at Bermuda Hundred June 25 and August 24–25. Mine Explosion, Petersburg, July 30. Battle of Chaffin's Farm, New Market Heights, September 28–30. Battle of Fair Oaks October 27–28. Duty at Staten Island and New York City during Presidential election of 1864, November 3–17, and in the trenches before Richmond until December 7. Expedition to Fort Fisher, N.C., December 7–27. Second Expedition to Fort Fisher, N.C., January 3–15, 1865. The regiment embarked at Fortress Monroe aboard the steamer Atlantic for this second expedition. Assault on and capture of Fort Fisher January 15. Sugar Loaf Battery February 11. Fort Anderson February 18. Capture of Wilmington February 22. Carolinas Campaign March 1-April 26. Advance on Kinston and Goldsboro March 6–21. Occupation of Goldsboro March 21. Occupation of Raleigh April 14. Bennett's House April 26. Surrender of Johnston and his army. Duty at Raleigh until June.

== Casualties ==
The regiment lost a total of 324 men during service; 9 officers and 122 enlisted men killed or mortally wounded, 3 officers and 190 enlisted men died of disease.

== Commanders ==
- Colonel Jeremiah C. Drake - died of wounds received in action at the Battle of Cold Harbor
- Colonel John F. Smith - killed in action during the assault on Fort Fisher, January 15, 1865
- Colonel Ephraim A. Ludwick

== Notable members ==
- First Lieutenant Selden E. Marvin – Adjutant General of New York
- Corporal Ebenezer Skellie, Company D – brevetted as second lieutenant and awarded the U.S. Medal of Honor for gallantry at the Battle of Chaffin's Farm

== See also ==
- List of New York Civil War regiments
- New York in the Civil War
