= 155th New York Infantry Regiment =

- Active: November 18, 1862, to July 15, 1865
- Country: United States
- Allegiance: Union
- Branch: Infantry
- Size: 830
- Engagements: Battle of Deserted House; Siege of Suffolk; Battle of Spotsylvania Court House; Battle of Totopotomoy Creek; Battle of Cold Harbor; Siege of Petersburg; Second Battle of Petersburg; Battle of Jerusalem Plank Road; Second Battle of Deep Bottom; Second Battle of Ream's Station; Battle of Hatcher's Run; Battle of Watkins' House; Appomattox Campaign; Battle of Sailor's Creek; Battle of Appomattox Court House

The 155th New York Infantry Regiment was an infantry regiment in the Union Army during the American Civil War.

== Service ==
The 155th New York Infantry was organized at New York City, New York, and mustered in for three years service on November 18, 1862, at Newport News, Virginia, under the command of Colonel William McEvily. It was one of the four regiments forming the brigade of Irish Soldiers known as the Corcoran Legion.

The regiment was attached to Newport News, Virginia, Department of Virginia, to December 1862. Corcoran's Brigade, Division at Suffolk, Virginia, VII Corps, Department of Virginia, to April 1863. 3rd Brigade, 1st Division, VII Corps, to July 1863. Corcoran's Brigade, King's Division, XXII Corps, Defenses of Washington, to November 1863. 1st Brigade, Corcoran's Division, XXII Corps, to December 1863. 2nd Brigade, Tyler's Division, XXII Corps, to May 1864. 4th Brigade, 2nd Division, II Corps, Army of the Potomac, to June 1864. 2nd Brigade, 2nd Division, II Corps, to July 1865.

The 155th New York Infantry mustered out of service July 15, 1865.

== Detailed service ==
- Left New York for Newport News, Va., November 10, 1862.
- Duty at Newport News, Va., until December 1862, and at Suffolk, Va., until June 1863.
- Expedition toward Blackwater January 8–10, 1863.
- Action at Deserted House January 30.
- Siege of Suffolk April 12-May 4.
  - Edenton Road and Nansemond April 15.
  - Edenton Road April 24.
  - Providence Church Road, Nansemond River, May 3.
- Siege of Suffolk raised May 4.
- Expedition to Blackwater June 12–18.
  - Carrsville June 16.
  - Blackwater June 17.
- Dix's Peninsula Campaign June 24-July 7.
- Moved to Washington, D.C., July 10, and duty in the defenses of that city and guard duty on Orange & Alexandria Railroad until May 1864.
  - Actions at Sangster's Station December 15 and 17, 1863.
- Ordered to join the Army of the Potomac in the field May 1864.
- Rapidan Campaign May 17-June 15.
  - Spotsylvania Court House May 17–21.
  - North Anna River May 23–26.
  - On line of the Pamunkey May 26–28.
  - Totopotomoy May 28–31. Cold Harbor June 1–12.
- Before Petersburg June 16–18.
- Siege of Petersburg June 16, 1864, to April 2, 1865.
  - Jerusalem Plank Road, Weldon Railroad, June 22–23, 1864.
  - Demonstration north of the James July 27–29.
  - Deep Bottom July 27–28.
  - Demonstration north of the James August 13–20.
  - Strawberry Plains, Deep Bottom, August 14–18.
  - Ream's Station August 25.
  - Boydton Plank Road, Hatcher's Run, October 27–28.
  - Dabney's Mills, Hatcher's Run, February 5–7, 1865.
  - Watkins' House March 25.
- Appomattox Campaign March 28-April 9.
  - Boydton Road and White Oak Ridge March 29–31.
  - Crow's House March 31.
  - Fall of Petersburg April 2.
  - Pursuit of Lee April 3–9.
  - Sailor's Creek April 6.
  - High Bridge, Farmville, April 7.
  - Appomattox Court House April 9.
- Surrender of Lee and his army. At Burkesville until May 2.
- March to Washington May 2–12.
- Grand Review of the Armies May 23.
- Duty at Washington until July.

== Casualties ==
The regiment lost a total of 187 men during service; 9 officers and 105 enlisted men killed or mortally wounded, 2 officers and 71 enlisted men died of disease. 13.7% of the men who served would die during the regiment's time of service.

== Commanders ==
- Colonel William McEvily
- Major John Byrne - commanded the regiment at the First Battle of Deep Bottom
- Captain Michael Doheny - commanded the regiment during the Appomattox Campaign

== See also ==
- List of New York Civil War regiments
- New York in the Civil War
