= Blackwater, Mathews County, Virginia =

Unincorporated community in Virginia, US

Coordinates: 37°25′36″N 76°23′59″W

Blackwater is an unincorporated community in Mathews County, in the U. S. state of Virginia.
