= Battle of Deserted House =

1863 American Civil War battle

- Part of the American Civil War
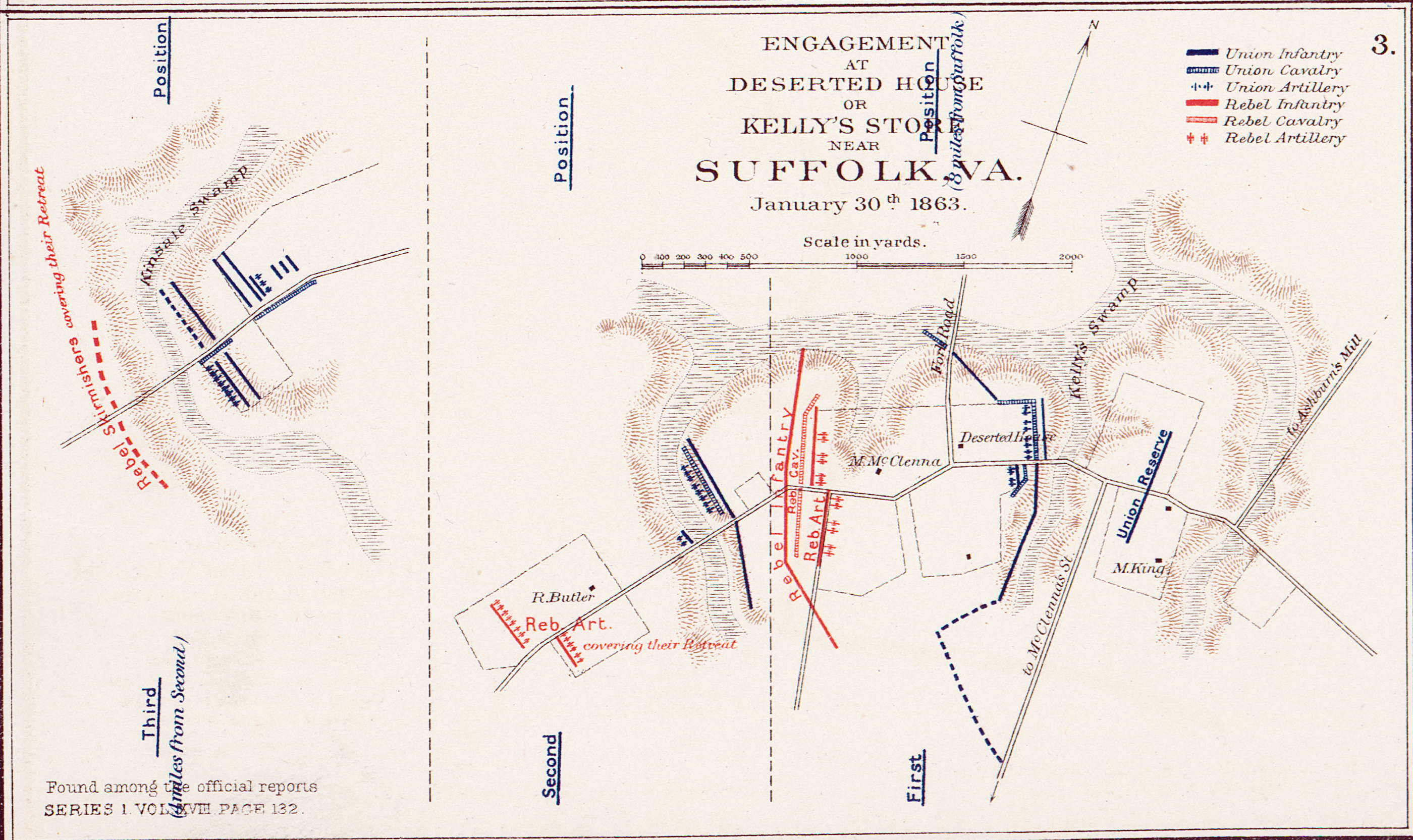
- Battle of Deserted House/Kelly's Store
Date	January 30, 1863
Location	Suffolk, Virginia 36°45′0.6″N 76°43′4.7″W
Result	Union victory

Belligerents
United States (Union)	(Confederate States of America) CSA (Confederacy)

Commanders and leaders
Gen. Michael Corcoran	Gen. Roger Atkinson Pryor

Strength
8,000	1,800

Casualties and losses
22 killed 108 wounded 12 missing 142 total	8 killed 31 wounded 39 total

The Battle of Deserted House, or the Battle of Kelly’s Store, was a minor engagement during the American Civil War in southeast Virginia.

Confederate forces under Brig. Gen. Roger A. Pryor crossed the Blackwater River into southeast Virginia on a foraging expedition. Maj. Gen. John J. Peck commanded the Union garrison at Suffolk. Peck organized a force to drive Pryor out of the area and assigned Brig. Gen. Michael Corcoran to its command. Anticipating an attack from the Union garrison, Pryor prepared his forces for battle near Kelly’s Store, located 8 miles west of Suffolk.

Corcoran’s cavalry engaged Pryor’s forces near a place called Deserted House. The Confederates retreated two miles before making another stand. The 13th Indiana Infantry charged and routed this new line. A final stand by the Confederates was made along the Blackwater River which was broken by the 11th Pennsylvania Cavalry. Although suffering far more casualties than the Confederates (142-39), the Union forces prevailed. Corcoran's troops returned to Suffolk the following day.

In April, a larger foraging effort and demonstration against Suffolk was carried out by Lt. Gen. James Longstreet.
