= 109th United States Colored Infantry Regiment =

- Active: July 5, 1864 – March 21, 1866
- Country: United States
- Allegiance: Union
- Branch: Union Army
- Type: Infantry
- Part of: XXIII Corps; XXV Corps
- Engagements: Petersburg Campaign; Appomattox Campaign

Insignia
- Identification symbol: Colonel Orion A. Bartholomew; Lieutenant Colonel James T. Bates; Major Lindley C. Kent

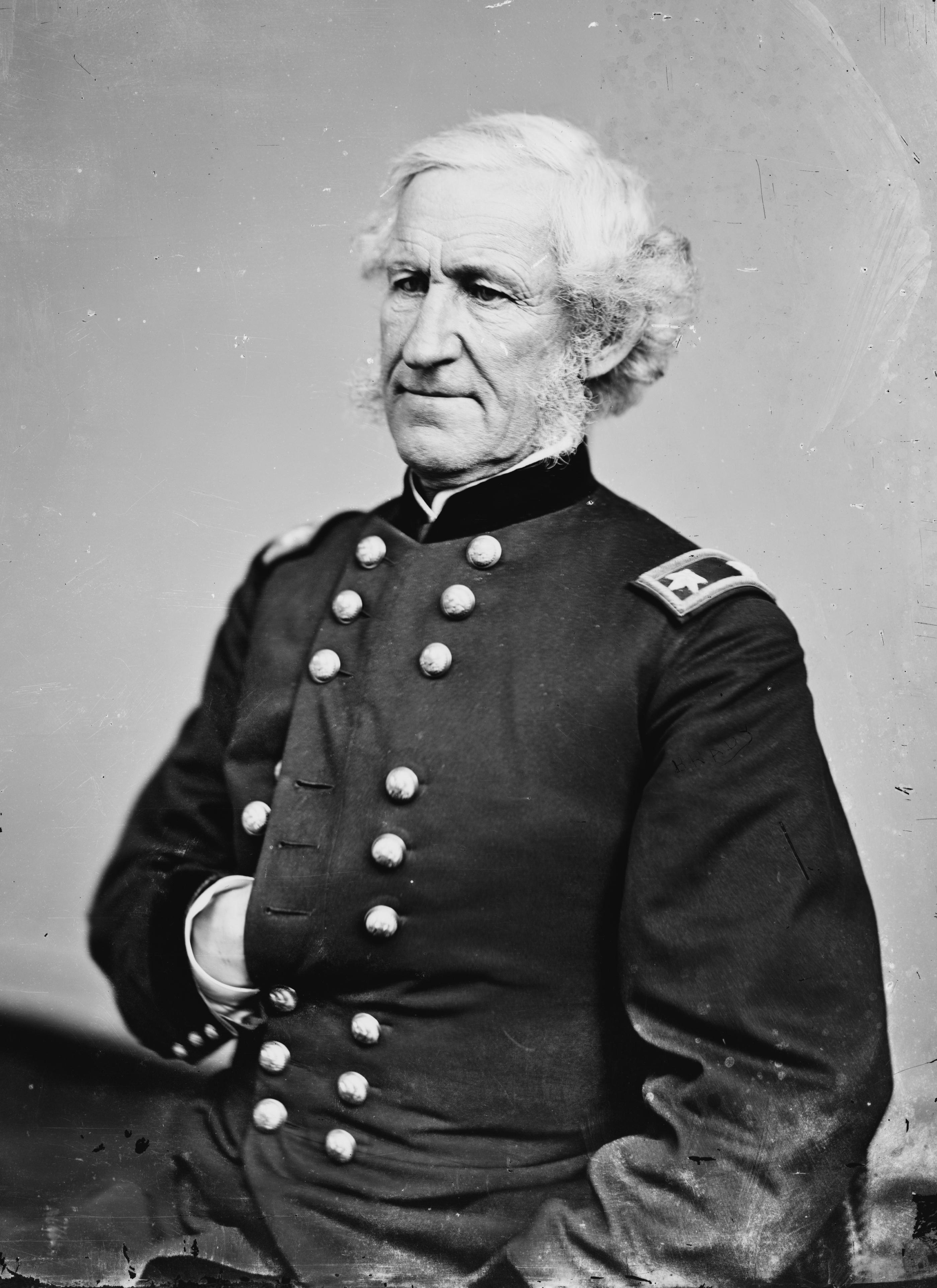
Adjutant General Lorenzo Thomas

The 109th United States Colored Infantry Regiment, was an infantry regiment that served with the Union army as part of the United States Colored Troops during the American Civil War. Raised in Kentucky, it would participate in the Eastern Theater, fighting from the battle at Fort Harrison, to the surrender of Lee's forces at Appomattox Court House.

== Service ==
The regiment was organized in Louisville, Kentucky, on July 5, 1864, and upon formation, it was sent for duty at Louisville and Louisa, with the regiment being attached to the 3rd Brigade, 1st Division, District of Kentucky, but was later assigned to the 5th Division, XXIII Corps of the Department of the Ohio, they continued this assignment until October. when it was ordered to be assigned to the Army of the Potomac.

In October 1864, Adjutant General Lorenzo Thomas arranged for several newly organized USCT regiments from Kentucky to be ordered to the frontlines of Virginia. The 109th, alongside the 107th, 116th, 117th and 118th USCIs, undertook the journey, traveling via steamboat from Kentucky to the riverports in West Virginia such as Wheeling and Parkersburg, and then moving by rail to Baltimore, Maryland, and would finally sail down the Chesapeake Bay to Fort Monroe and then to City Point, Virginia.

Upon arriving to Virginia at the end of October, it would be assigned to the Army of the James, and was attached to the 1st Brigade, 2nd Division of XXV Corps. Lieutenant Colonel John Pierson reported that the white soldiers and officers of the XXV Corps had welcomed them and were eager to have USCI regiments to be brigaded with them, expressing a belief that racial prejudices were fading. Subsequently, Veteran USCT soldiers criticized the newly raised Kentucky troops, with a veteran officer of the 7th USCI describing the fresh arrival of these regiments as entirely inexperienced in military matters, particularly criticizing their competence in picket duty.

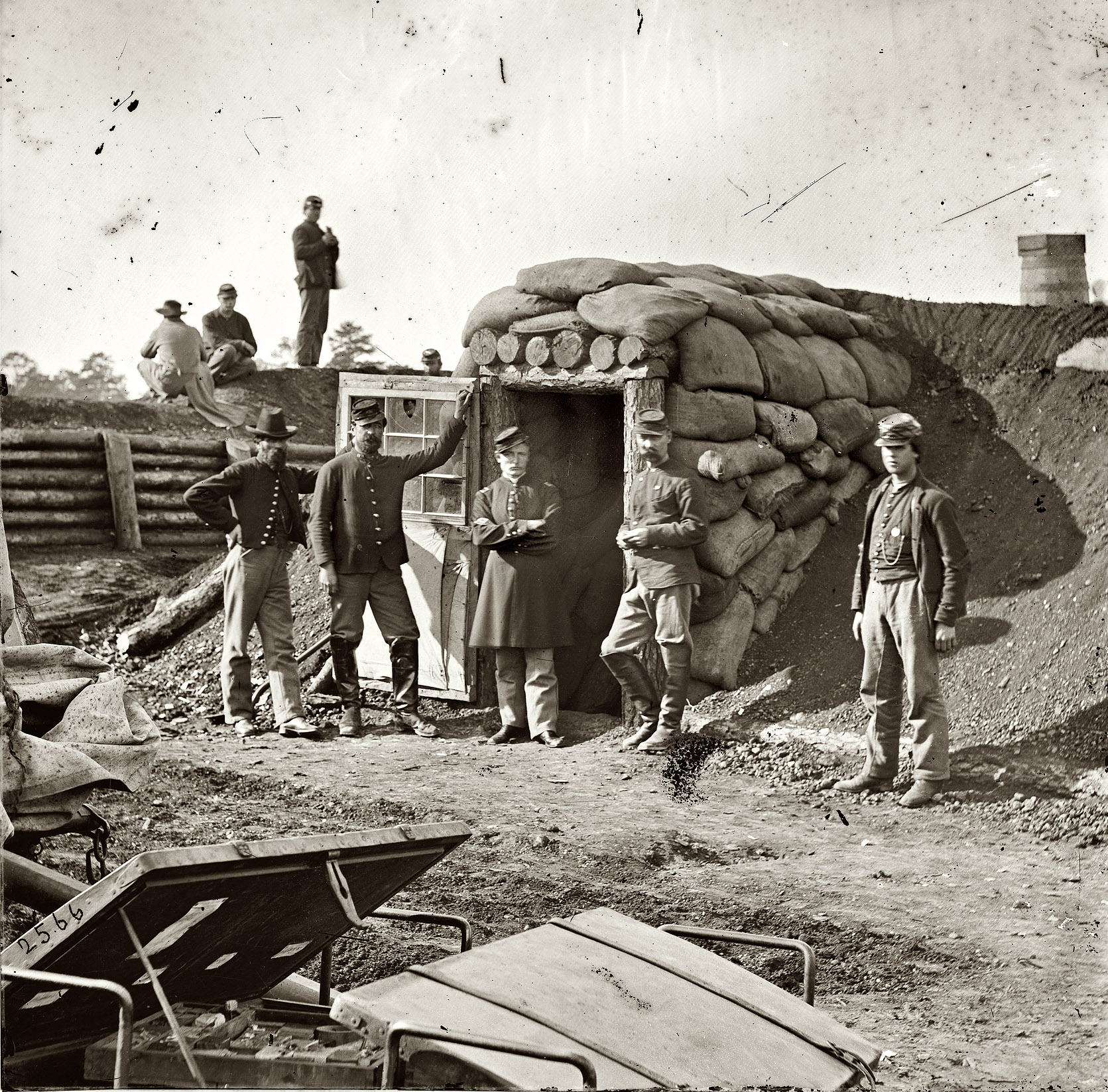
Fort Harrison

The regiment was sent for duty at Deep Bottom and in the trenches of Richmond, just north of the James River. As Winter approached, poor weather and road conditions brough movements to a halt. Officers of the 109th noted that the impassable roads would prevent any fighting for the fall and winter, prompting the men to focus entirely on fortifying their winter quarters. On December 10, the regiment would see action at Fort Harrison.

A persistent problem with newly formed USCI regiments was fraud by officers, from the Ohio River to the Gulf Coast. The 109th was also impacted by this, when the regiment received its first paid in September 1864, Lieutenant Colonel John Pierson collected $2,200 in trust. However, Pierson resigned his commission in December 1864 and absconded the funds. Due to him leaving the army, he remained beyond the reach of military justice when investigation into the missing money was launched during the regiment's mustering out of service just 15 months later.

In January, the regiment took part in siege operations during the Petersburg Campaign, and would later move to Hatcher's Run on March 28. The regiment would take part in the Appomattox Campaign, fighting in the battles of Boydton Road, Hatcher's Run, Third Battle of Petersburg, and would join in the pursue of Lee's army until Appomattox Court House, witnessing the surrender of Lee and his army.

After the campaign, it was sent for duty at Petersburg and City Point until May, 1865, when they embarked to Texas, arriving at Indianola in June 25. In July, the regiment would conduct its last assignment of duty at Indianola and various until March, 1866.

The regiment would be mustered out of service on March 21, 1866.

== Commanders ==
- Colonel Orion A. Bartholomew (promoted to Brevet Brig. Gen. on March 13, 1865)
- Lieutenant Colonel James T. Bates
- Major Lindley C. Kent

== See also ==
- List of United States Colored Troops units in the American Civil War
- Louisville in the American Civil War
