= 7th United States Colored Infantry Regiment =

7th United States Colored Infantry
- Active: September 26, 1863, to November 15, 1866
- Country: United States
- Allegiance: Union
- Branch: Infantry
- Engagements: Siege of Petersburg; Battle of Chaffin's Farm; Second Battle of Deep Bottom; Battle of Darbytown Road; Battle of Fair Oaks & Darbytown Road; Appomattox Campaign

The 7th United States Colored Infantry was an infantry regiment that served in the Union Army during the American Civil War. The regiment was composed of African American enlisted men commanded by white officers and was authorized by the Bureau of Colored Troops which was created by the United States War Department on May 22, 1863.

== Service ==
The 7th U.S. Colored Infantry was organized at Baltimore, Maryland, beginning September 26, 1863, and mustered in November 12, 1863.

The regiment was attached to Post of Jacksonville, Florida, District of Florida, Department of the South, to July 1864. District of Hilton Head, South Carolina, Department of the South, July 1864. Jacksonville, Florida, District of Florida, Department of the South, to August 1864. 1st Brigade, 3rd Division, X Corps, Army of the James, Department of Virginia and North Carolina, to December 1864. 1st Brigade, 2nd Division, XXV Corps, to January 1866. Department of Texas to October 1866.

The 7th U.S. Colored Infantry mustered out of service October 13, 1866, and was discharged November 15, 1866, at Baltimore.

== Detailed service ==
Duty at Camp Benedict, Md., until March 1864. Ordered to Portsmouth, Va., March 4, then to Hilton Head, S.C., March 7–10, and to Jacksonville, Fla., March 14–15.

Duty at Jacksonville, Fla., until June 1864. Cedar Creek April 2. Near Jacksonville May 6. Near Camp Finnegan May 25. Near Jacksonville May 28. Expedition to Camp Milton May 31 – June 3. Camp Milton June 2.

Moved to Hilton Head, S.C., June 27. Expedition to North Edisto River and Johns and James Islands July 2–10. Near Winter's Point July 3. King's Creek July 3. Skirmishes on James Island July 5 and 7. Burden's Causeway, Johns Island, July 9.

Moved to Jacksonville July 15. Expedition to Florida & Gulf Railroad July 22 – August 5.

Moved to Bermuda Hundred, Va., August 6–11. Siege operations against Petersburg and Richmond August 1864 to April 1865. Demonstration north of the James River August 16–20. Russell's Mills August 16. Strawberry Plains August 16–18. Battle of Chaffin's Farm, New Market Heights, September 28–30. Darbytown Road October 13. Battle of Fair Oaks October 27–28. Near Richmond October 28. In trenches before Richmond until March 27, 1865. Appomattox Campaign March 27 – April 9. Hatcher's Run March 29–31. Fall of Petersburg April 2. Pursuit of Lee April 3–9. Appomattox Court House April 9. Surrender of Lee and his army.

Moved to Petersburg April 11, and duty there until May 24.

Moved to Indianola, Texas, May 24 – June 23. Duty on the Rio Grande River and at various points in the Department of Texas, until October 1866.

Moved to Baltimore, Md., October 14 – November 4.

== Casualties ==
The regiment lost a total of 393 men during service; one officer and 84 enlisted men killed or mortally wounded, one officer and 307 enlisted men died of disease.

== Commanders ==
- Colonel James Shaw Jr.

== See also ==
- List of United States Colored Troops Civil War Units
- United States Colored Troops
