= 122nd United States Colored Infantry Regiment =

122nd US Colored Infantry Regiment
- Flag of the United States (1863-1865)
- Active: December 31, 1864 – February 8, 1866
- Country: United States
- Allegiance: Union
- Branch: Infantry
- Engagements: Siege of Petersburg

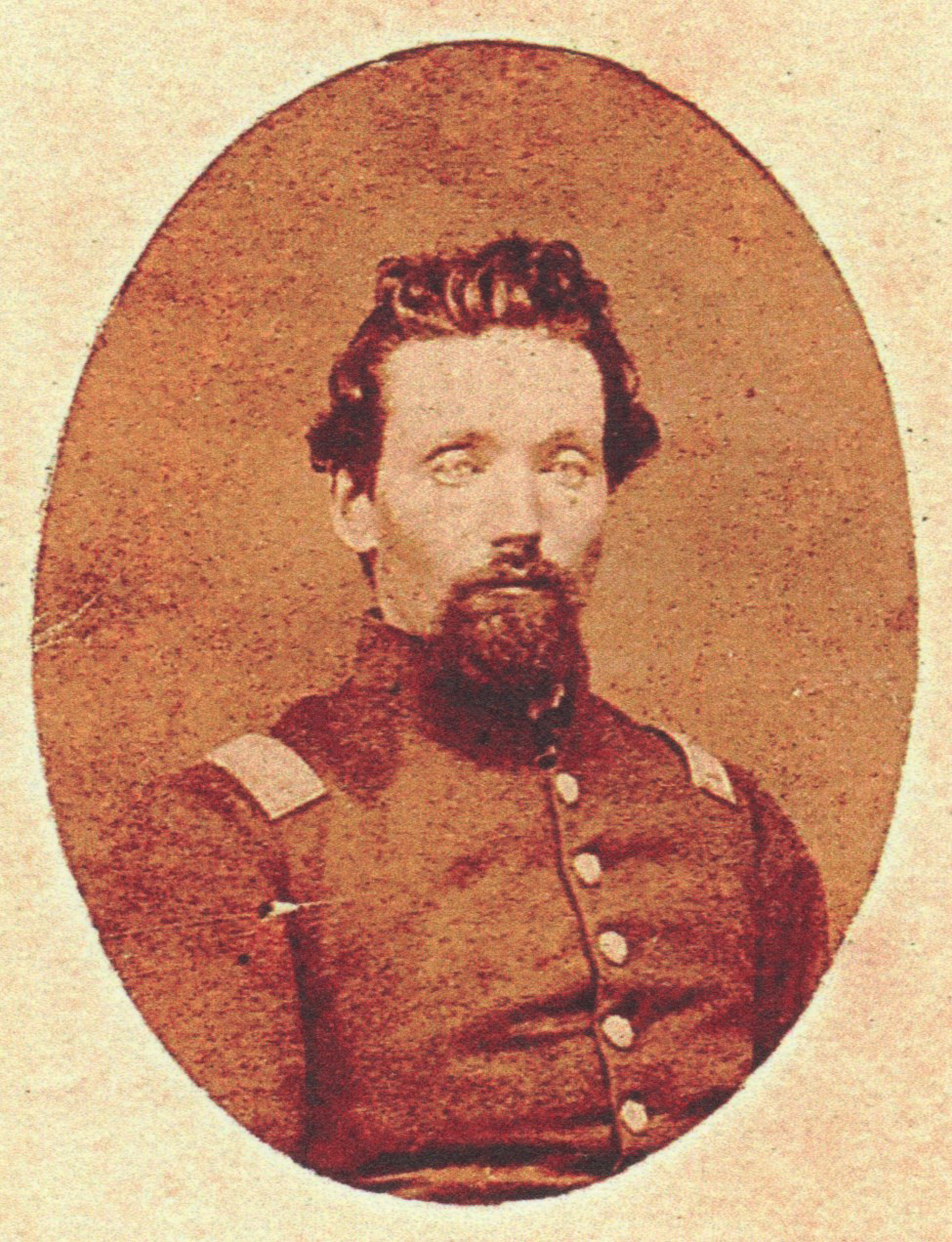
Major Alexander A. Monroe (Previously a Lieutenant of the 21st Ohio Volunteer Infantry Regiment)

The 122nd United States Colored Infantry was an infantry regiment of the USCT that served during the final stages of the American Civil War.

== Service ==
The regiment was mustered into service at Louisville, Kentucky, on December 31, 1864, they were consolidated into a battalion from three companies.

In January 1865, the regiment was ordered to Virginia. It was attached to the XXVth Corps of the Army of the James, a corps notable for being composed of African-American troops.

The 122nd served in the defense of Portsmouth, Virginia, until February, after which they participated in siege operations at the Siege of Petersburg and Richmond. The regiment witnessed the fall of the Confederate Capital on April 2–3, 1865. They remained there for duty in Virginia through the early summer.

In June 1865, the regiment was transferred to the Department of Texas to join the Army of Occupation. After traveling to Brazos Santiago, they were stationed at Brownsville and other strategic points along the Rio Grande until February, 1866. during this period, they were assigned to the Department of Texas.

The regiment was mustered out of service on February 8, 1866.

== Commanders ==
- Colonel J. Ham Davidson (Discharged on January 17, 1866)
- Lieutenant Colonel David M. Layman
- Major Alexander A. Monroe (Discharged on January 17, 1866)

== Disbandment ==
The regiment was officially mustered out on February 8, 1866, after serving just one year.

== See also ==
- List of United States Colored Troops units in the American Civil War
