= 118th United States Colored Infantry Regiment =

- Active: October 19, 1864 - February 6, 1866
- Country: United States
- Allegiance: Union
- Branch: United States Colored Troops
- Type: Infantry
- Size: Regiment
- Part of: XXV Corps
- Engagements: Petersburg Campaign; Occupation of Richmond; Battle of Bagdad

The 118th United States Colored Infantry Regiment, was an infantry regiment that served in the United States Colored Troops during the American Civil War. Organized at Baltimore, Maryland, the regiment would take part in the Siege of Petersburg and would face disciplinary challenges while stationed in Texas.

== Organization and early service ==
The regiment was organized at Baltimore, Maryland on October 19, 1864. Throughout its service, it faced organizational challenges, at one point, the 118th lacked 21 men to make up its full complement. Furthermore, an absence of formal instruction and discipline handicapped this and other colored regiments throughout their service.

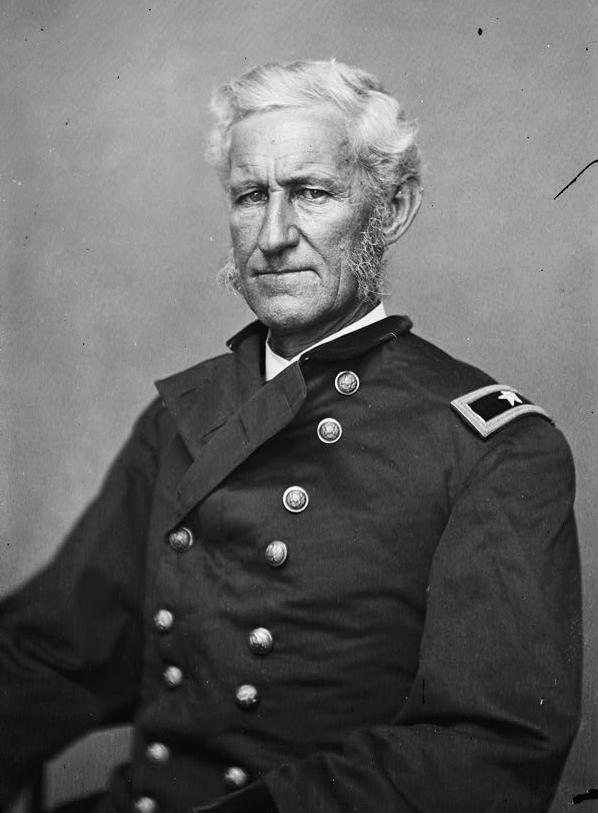
Portrait of Adjutant General Lorenzo Thomas

Elements of the regiment were stationed in Kentucky, where they faced severe hostility from local Confederate sympathizers. The officer commanding the 118th garrison at Owensboro reported the murder of 3 of his enlisted men by local guerillas. Despite this violent opposition, enlistments remained robust, a recruiter in Henderson reported that 4 and 6 men were enlisting daily. By mid-September, Adjutant General Lorenzo Thomas reported to the Secretary of War that 14,000 African-American Kentuckians had enlisted in the Union Army.

== Service ==
Several days after they were organized, on October 26, they would move to City Point, Virginia and would be attached to the Provisional Brigade, 3rd Division, XXV Corps of the Army of the James. On December, it was attached to the 1st Brigade, 1st Division of the XXV Corps. from January to March, it would take part in the Petersburg Campaign, and would later join in the occupation of Richmond, it would continue their duty in the Department of Virginia until June, 1865, when it moved to Brazos Santiago, Texas.

=== Situation in Texas and the Battle of Bagdad ===
During this period, the camp of the 118th was located near the town of Clarksville, Texas, directly across the Rio Grande from Bagdad, Mexico. Between 3:00 and 4:00 a.m. on January 5, 1866, the regiment's commanding officer, Colonel John C. Moon was awakened by the sound of cannon fire originating from a French gunboat on the river. Enlisted men who were on guard duty initially speculated that the "French were fighting among themselves"

The gunfire was actually a part of a cross-border raid. A commander named Reed, leading a force estimated at between 60 and 150 men, launched an attack to capture Bagdad. The Mexican Imperialist garrison quickly surrender, leading to many of the defending troops defecting on the spot. A severe breakdown within the 118th's camp led to approximately 30 enlisted men of the regiment crossed the Rio Grande to join Reed's force

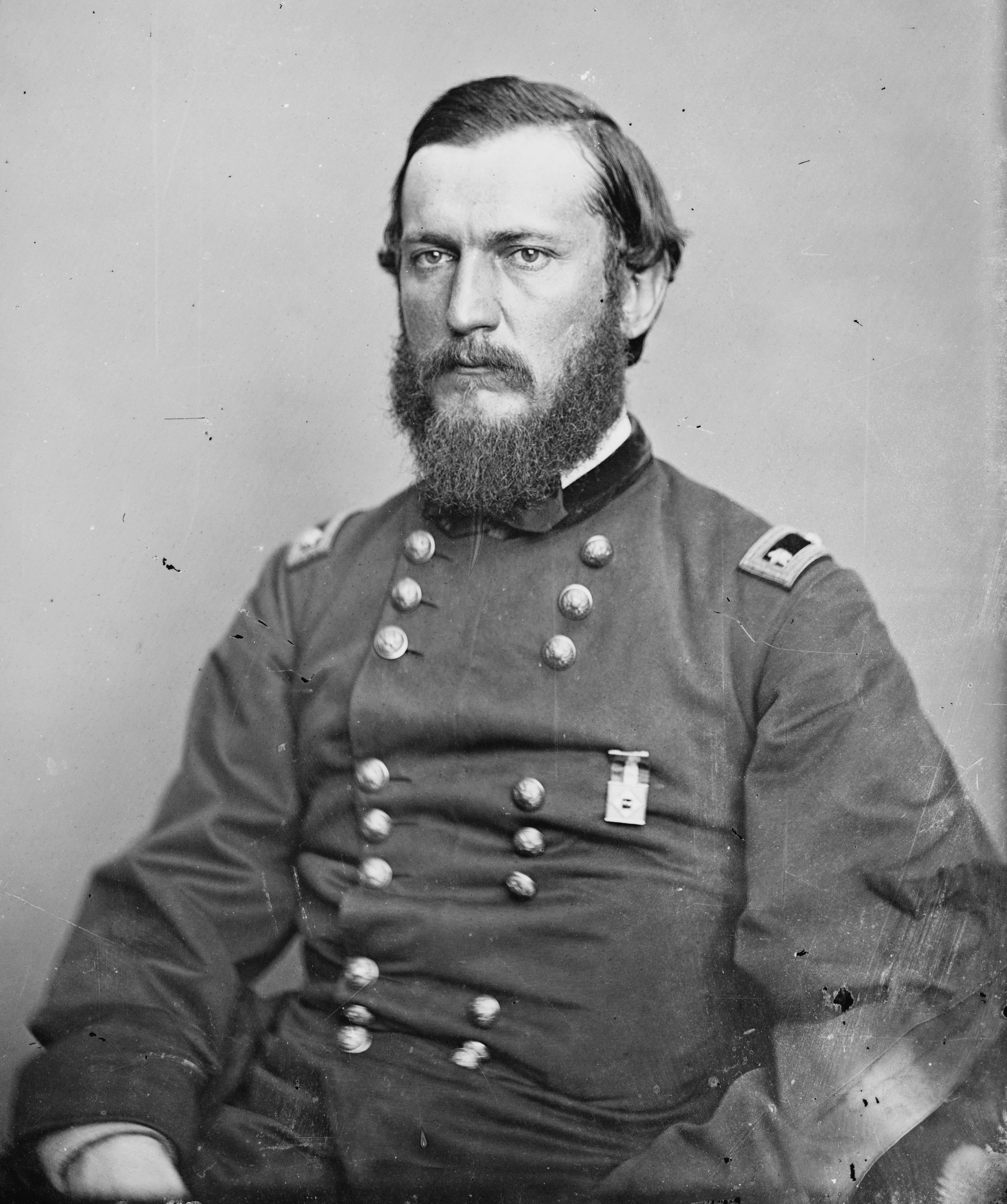
Portrait of Major General Godfrey Weitzel

By daybreak on January 5, refugees from the fighting packed both banks of the Rio Grande as boats transported people across the river. When Surgeon Russell D. Adams of the 118th crossed over to Bagdad, later that morning to care care for the wounded. Adams located a wounded soldier from his regiment, but didn't record the man's name. Just two months prior, Major General Godfrey Weitzel had ranked the 118th fifth from the bottom among his regiments regarding disciplined and readiness.

=== Military trials and relief of the 118th from Bagdad ===
In subsequent military commission hearings, it was revealed that an officer named Fierbaugh could not name any of the soldiers he rounded up during the incident. Captain Lewis Moon, who succeeded Fierbaugh as officer of the day, testified that he did not know the names of any enlisted men outside his own company. Both officers admitted that the regiment had never maintained records about soldier arrests or subsequent punishments. Moon defended his actions by stating that he had no specific instructions to record the names of the men he apprehended.

With Mexican Imperialist forces unable to restore order in Badgad, they requested assistance from Union forces at Clarksville. The day after the Initial Raid, 200 officers and men of the 118th were sent to Bagdad to restore order, but due to concerns of the regiment's reliability, it was relieved a few days later by the 46th USCI.

would spend the rest of their service conducting duty at Brownsville and at various points on the Rio Grande until February, 1866.

The regiment was mustered out of service on February 6, 1866.

== Commanders ==
- Colonel John C. Moon (Promoted to Brevet Brigadier General on November 21, 1865)
- Lieutenant Colonel Isaac D. Davis
- Major Edmund De Buck

== See also ==
- List of United States Colored Troops units in the American Civil War
