= 137th Regiment =

137th Regiment may refer to:

- 137th Air Reconnaissance Regiment, Yugoslavia
- 137th Aviation Regiment, United States
- 137th Guards Airborne Regiment, Russia
- 137th Infantry Regiment (United States)
- 137th (Mixed) Heavy Anti-Aircraft Regiment, Royal Artillery

== American Civil War regiments ==
- 137th Illinois Infantry Regiment
- 137th Indiana Infantry Regiment
- 137th New York Infantry Regiment
- 137th Ohio Infantry Regiment
- 137th Pennsylvania Infantry Regiment
- 137th United States Colored Infantry Regiment

== See also ==
- 137th Division (disambiguation)
- 137th (disambiguation)
