= Furbush =

Furbush is a surname.

- Charlie Furbush (born 1986), Major League Baseball pitcher
- Michael Furbush, American politician
- Richard I. Furbush (1904–1990), state senator in Massachusetts
- William Hines Furbush (c. 1839–1902), United States Colored Infantry soldier, civil rights leader, state legislator, sheriff, and newspaper editor
