= 135th United States Colored Infantry Regiment =

- Active: March 28, 1865 - October 23, 1865
- Country: United States
- Allegiance: Union
- Branch: United States Colored Troops; Infantry
- Size: Regiment
- Engagements: None

The 135th United States Colored Infantry Regiment, was an infantry regiment that served with the USCT during the closing months of the American Civil War.

== Service ==
During Sherman's Carolinas Campaign, Major General Francis P. Blair Jr was permitted by the War Department to raise a Colored regiment. The 135th Regiment Infantry U.S. Colored Troops was mustered into service at Goldsboro, North Carolina, on March 28, 1865.

The regiment conducted duty in the Department of North Carolina until October 1865.

The regiment was mustered out of service on October 23, 1865

== Commanders ==
- Colonel John E. Gurley
- Lieutenant Colonel David H. Budlong
- Major David Dixon

== See also ==
- List of United States Colored Troops units in the American Civil War
