= Senator York =

Senator York may refer to:

- Alexander M. York (1838–1928), Kansas State Senate
- Marvin York (1932–2025), Oklahoma State Senate
- Myrth York (born 1946), Rhode Island State Senate
- Tyre York (1836–1916), North Carolina State Senate
