= Carpetbagger =

Pejorative for Northerners who moved South after the American Civil War

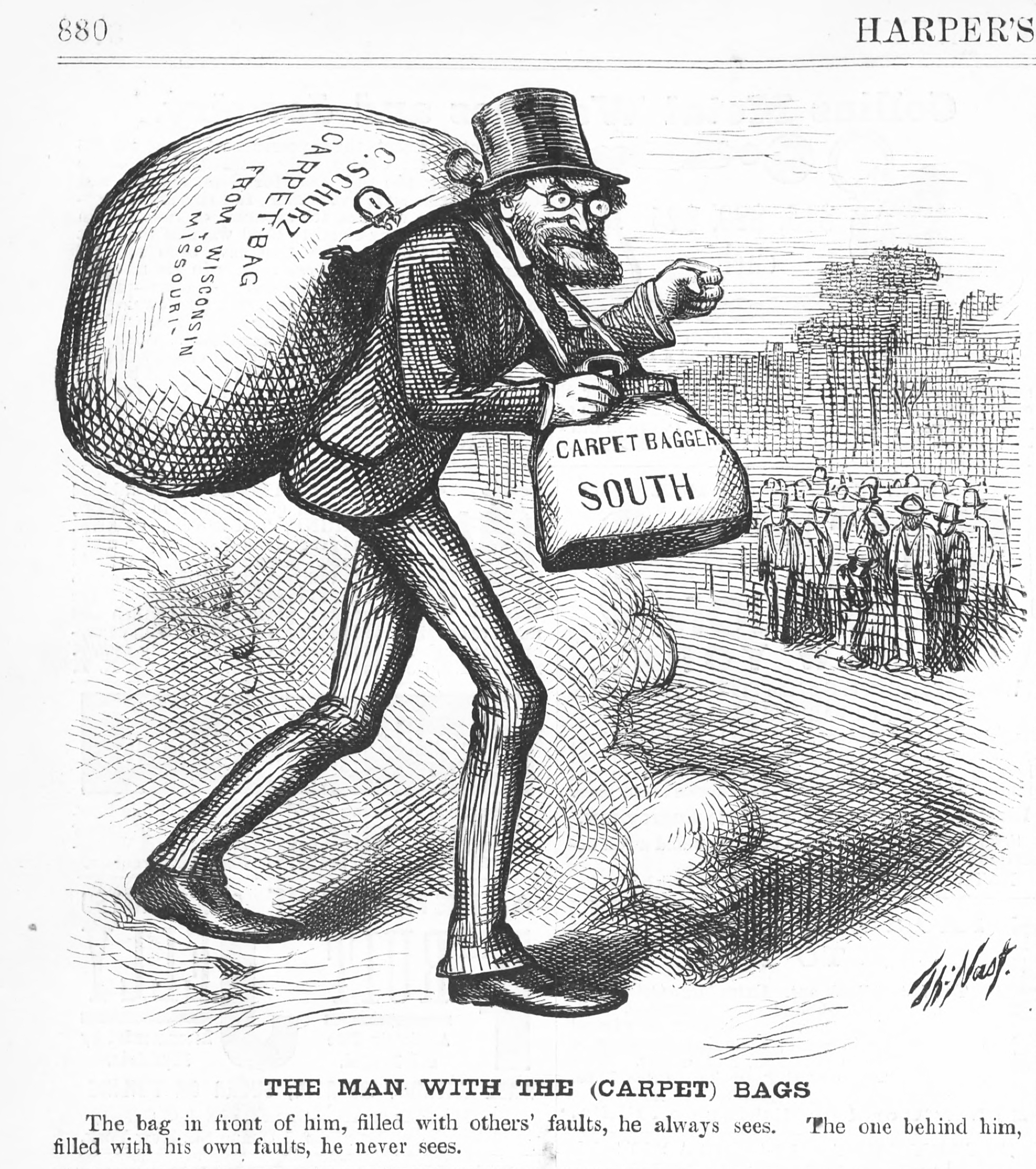
1872 cartoon depiction of Carl Schurz as a carpetbagger

In the history of the United States, carpetbagger is a largely historical pejorative used by Southerners to describe opportunistic or disruptive Northerners who came to the Southern states after the American Civil War and were perceived to be exploiting the local populace for their own financial, political, or social gain. The term broadly included both individuals who sought to promote Republican politics (including the right of African Americans to vote and hold office) and individuals who saw business and political opportunities because of the chaotic state of the local economies following the war. In practice, the term carpetbagger often was applied to any Northerners who were present in the South during the Reconstruction era (1865–1877). The word is closely associated with scalawag, a similarly pejorative word used to describe white Southerners who supported the Republican Party-led Reconstruction.

White Southerners commonly denounced carpetbaggers collectively during the post-war years, fearing they would loot and plunder the defeated South and be allied politically with the Radical Republicans. Sixty men from the North, including educated free blacks and slaves who had escaped to the North and returned South after the war, were elected from the South as Republicans to Congress. The majority of Republican governors in the South during Reconstruction were from the North. Since the end of the Reconstruction era, the term has been used to denote people who move into a new area for purely economic or political reasons despite having no ties to that place.

== Etymology and definition ==
The term carpetbagger, used exclusively as a pejorative term, originated from the carpet bag, a form of cheap luggage made from carpet fabric, which many of the newcomers carried. The term came to be associated with opportunism and exploitation by outsiders. It is now used in the United States to refer to a parachute candidate, that is, an outsider who runs for public office in an area without having lived there for more than a short time, or without having other significant community ties.

According to a 1912 book by Oliver Temple Perry, Tennessee Secretary of State and Radical Republican Andrew J. Fletcher "was one of the first, if not the very first, in the State to denounce the hordes of greedy office-seekers who came from the North in the rear of the army in the closing days of the [U.S. Civil] War", in a June 1867 stump speech that he delivered across Tennessee in support of the re-election of the disabled Tennessee Governor William G. Brownlow:

No one more gladly welcomes the Northern man who comes in all sincerity to make a home here, and to become one of our people, than I, but for the adventurer and the office-seeker who comes among us with one dirty shirt and a pair of dirty socks, in an old rusty carpet bag, and before his washing is done becomes a candidate for office, I have no welcome.

That was the origin of the term "carpet bag", and out of it grew the well known term "carpet-bag government".

In the United Kingdom at the end of the 20th century, carpetbagger developed another meaning, referring to people who joined a mutual organization, such as a building society, in order to force it to demutualize, that is, to convert into a joint stock company, seeking personal financial gain by that means.

== Background ==
The Republican Party in the South comprised three groups after the Civil War, and white Democratic Southerners referred to two in derogatory terms. Scalawags were white Southerners who supported the Republican Party; "carpetbaggers" were recent arrivals in the region from the North; and freedmen were freed slaves. Most of the 430 Republican newspapers in the South were edited by scalawags, and 20 percent were edited by carpetbaggers. White businessmen generally boycotted Republican papers, which survived through government patronage.

Historian Eric Foner argues:

most carpetbaggers probably combine the desire for personal gain with a commitment to taking part in an effort "to substitute the civilization of freedom for that of slavery" .... Carpetbaggers generally supported measures aimed at democratizing and modernizing the South – civil rights legislation, aid to economic development, the establishment of public school systems.

=== Reforming impulse ===
Beginning in 1862, Northern abolitionists moved to areas in the South that had fallen under Union control. Schoolteachers and religious missionaries went to the South to teach the freedmen; some were sponsored by northern churches. Some were abolitionists who sought to continue the struggle for racial equality; they often became agents of the federal Freedmen's Bureau, which started operations in 1865 to assist the vast numbers of recently emancipated slaves. The bureau established schools in rural areas of the South for the purpose of educating the mostly illiterate Black and Poor White population. Other Northerners who moved to the South did so to participate in the profitable business of rebuilding railroads and various other forms of infrastructure that had been destroyed during the war.

During the time most blacks were enslaved, many were prohibited from being educated and attaining literacy. Southern states had no public school systems, and upper-class white Southerners either sent their children to private schools (including in England) or hired private tutors. After the war, hundreds of Northern white women moved South, many to teach the newly freed African-American children. They joined like-minded Southerners, most of which were employed by the Methodist and Baptist churches, who spent much of their time teaching and preaching to slave and freedpeople congregations both before and after the Civil War.

=== Economic motives ===
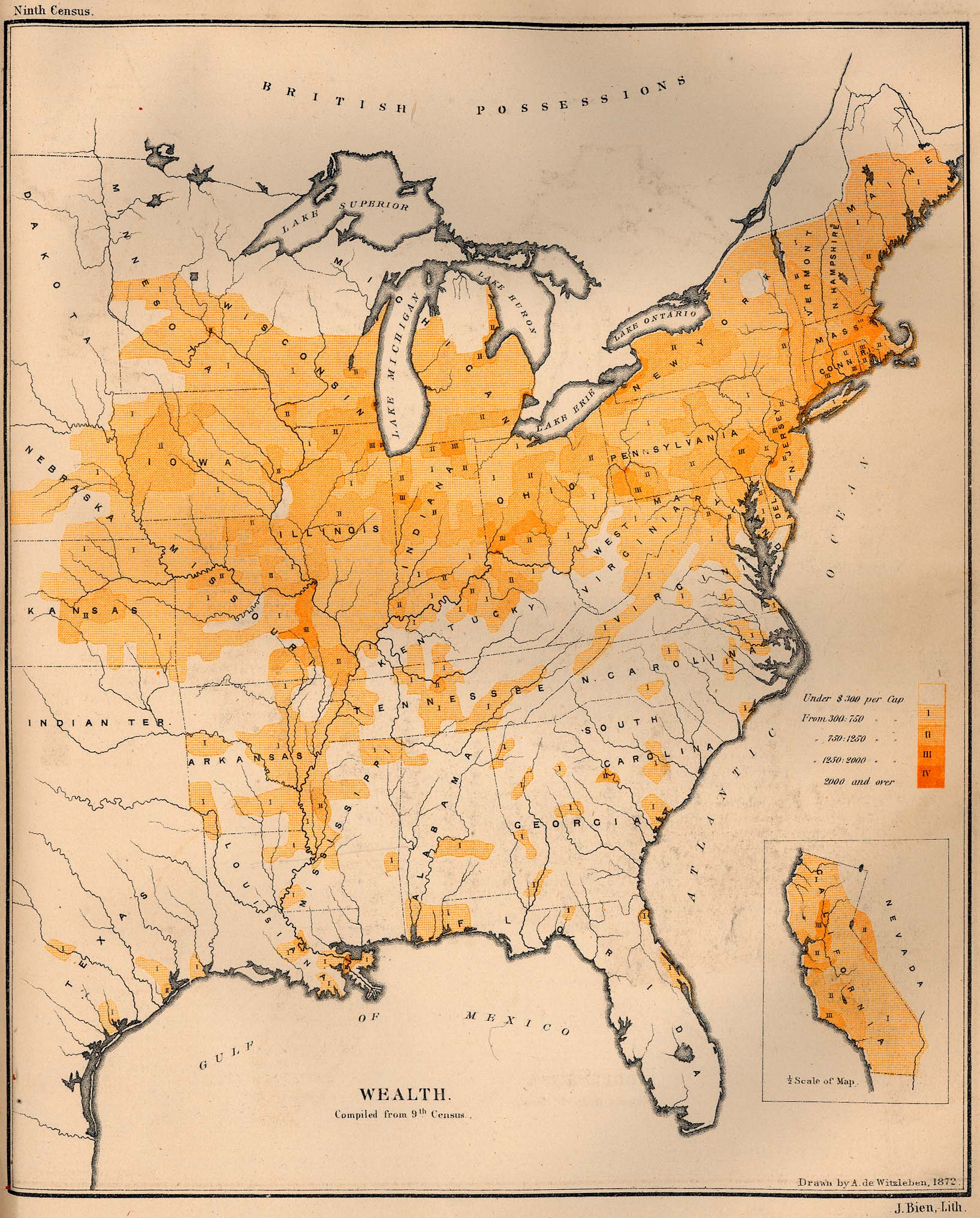
Map of the United States in 1872, showing the disparity of wealth between the North and South during the Reconstruction Era

Carpetbaggers established banks and retail businesses. Most were former Union soldiers eager to invest their savings and energy in this promising new frontier, and civilians lured south by press reports of "the fabulous sums of money to be made in the South in raising cotton." Foner notes that "joined with the quest for profit, however, was a reforming spirit, a vision of themselves as agents of sectional reconciliation and the South's economic regeneration." Accustomed to viewing Southerners—black and white—as devoid of economic initiative, the "Puritan work ethic", and self-discipline, they believed that only "Northern capital and energy" could bring "the blessings of a free labor system to the region."

Carpetbaggers tended to be well educated and middle class in origin. Some had been lawyers, businessmen, and newspaper editors. The majority (including 52 of the 60 who served in Congress during Reconstruction) were veterans of the Union Army. Leading "black carpetbaggers" believed that the interests of capital and labor were identical and that the freedmen were entitled to little more than an "honest chance in the race of life."

Many Northern and Southern Republicans shared a modernizing vision of upgrading the Southern economy and society, one that would replace the inefficient Southern plantation regime with railroads, factories, and more efficient farming. They actively promoted public schooling and created numerous colleges and universities. The Northerners were especially successful in taking control of Southern railroads, aided by state legislatures. In 1870, Northerners controlled 21% of the South's railroads (by mileage); 19% of the directors were from the North. By 1890, they controlled 88% of the mileage; 47% of the directors were from the North.

== Prominent examples in state politics ==
=== Mississippi ===
Union General Adelbert Ames, a native of Maine, was appointed military governor and later was elected as Republican governor of Mississippi. Ames tried unsuccessfully to ensure equal rights for black Mississippians. His political battles with the Southerners and African Americans ripped apart his party.

The "Black and Tan" (biracial) constitutional convention in Mississippi in 1868 included 30 white Southerners, 17 Southern freedmen and 24 non-southerners, nearly all of whom were veterans of the Union Army. They included four men who had lived in the South before the war, two of whom had served in the Confederate States Army. Among the more prominent were General Beroth B. Eggleston, a native of New York; Colonel A.T. Morgan of the Second Wisconsin Volunteers; General W.S. Barry, former commander of a Colored regiment raised in Kentucky; an Illinois general and lawyer who graduated from Knox College; Major W.H. Gibbs of the Fifteenth Illinois infantry; Judge W. B. Cunningham of Pennsylvania; and Captain E.J. Castello of the Seventh Missouri infantry. They were among the founders of the Republican Party in Mississippi.

They were prominent in the politics of the state until 1875, but nearly all left Mississippi in 1875 to 1876 under pressure from the Red Shirts and White Liners. These white paramilitary organizations, described as "the military arm of the Democratic Party", worked openly to violently overthrow Republican rule, using intimidation and assassination to turn Republicans out of office and suppress freedmen's voting. Mississippi Representative Wiley P. Harris, a Democrat, stated in 1875:

If any two hundred Southern men backed by a Federal administration should go to Indianapolis, turn out the Indiana people, take possession of all the seats of power, honor, and profit, denounce the people at large as assassins and barbarians, introduce corruption in all the branches of the public administration, make government a curse instead of a blessing, league with the most ignorant class of society to make war on the enlightened, intelligent, and virtuous, what kind of social relations would such a state of things beget.

Albert T. Morgan, Republican sheriff of Yazoo, Mississippi, received a brief flurry of national attention when insurgent white Democrats took over the county government and forced him to flee. He later wrote Yazoo; Or, on the Picket Line of Freedom in the South (1884).

On November 6, 1875, Hiram Revels, a Mississippi Republican and the first African American U.S. Senator, wrote a letter to U.S. President Ulysses S. Grant that was widely reprinted. Revels denounces Ames and Northerners for manipulating the Black vote for personal benefit, and for keeping alive wartime hatreds:

Since reconstruction, the masses of my people have been, as it were, enslaved in mind by unprincipled adventurers, who, caring nothing for country, were willing to stoop to anything no matter how infamous, to secure power to themselves, and perpetuate it .... My people have been told by these schemers, when men have been placed on the ticket who were notoriously corrupt and dishonest, that they must vote for them; that the salvation of the party depended upon it; that the man who scratched a ticket was not a Republican. This is only one of the many means these unprincipled demagogues have devised to perpetuate the intellectual bondage of my people .... The bitterness and hate created by the late civil strife has, in my opinion, been obliterated in this state, except perhaps in some localities, and would have long since been entirely obliterated, were it not for some unprincipled men who would keep alive the bitterness of the past, and inculcate a hatred between the races, in order that they may aggrandize themselves by office, and its emoluments, to control my people, the effect of which is to degrade them.

Elza Jeffords, a lawyer from Ohio who fought with the Army of the Tennessee, remained in Mississippi after the conclusion of the Civil War. He was the last Republican to represent that state in the U.S. House of Representatives, serving from 1883 to 1885. He died in Vicksburg, 16 days after he left Congress. The next Republican congressman from the state was not elected until 80 years later in 1964: Prentiss Walker of Mize, who served a single term from 1965 to 1967.

=== North Carolina ===
Corruption was a charge made by Democrats in North Carolina against the Republicans, notes historian Paul Escott, "because its truth was apparent." Historians Foner and W.E.B. Du Bois have noted that Democrats as well as Republicans received bribes and participated in decisions about the railroads. General Milton S. Littlefield was dubbed the "Prince of Carpetbaggers", and bought votes in the legislature "to support grandiose and fraudulent railroad schemes". Escott concludes that some Democrats were involved, but Republicans "bore the main responsibility for the issue of $28 million in state bonds for railroads and the accompanying corruption. This sum, enormous for the time, aroused great concern." Foner says Littlefield disbursed $200,000 (bribes) to win support in the legislature for state money for his railroads, and Democrats as well as Republicans were guilty of taking the bribes and making the decisions on the railroad. North Carolina Democrats condemned the legislature's "depraved villains, who take bribes every day"; one local Republican officeholder complained, "I deeply regret the course of some of our friends in the Legislature as well as out of it in regard to financial matters, it is very embarrassing indeed."

Escott notes that extravagance and corruption increased taxes and the costs of government in a state that had always favored low expenditure. The context was that a planter elite kept taxes low because it benefited them. They used their money toward private ends rather than public investment. None of the states had established public school systems before the Reconstruction state legislatures created them, and they had systematically underinvested in infrastructure such as roads and railroads. Planters whose properties occupied prime riverfront locations relied on river transportation, but smaller farmers in the backcountry suffered.

Escott claims "Some money went to very worthy causes—the 1869 legislature, for example, passed a school law that began the rebuilding and expansion of the state's public schools. But far too much was wrongly or unwisely spent" to aid the Republican Party leadership. A Republican county commissioner in Alamance eloquently denounced the situation: "Men are placed in power who instead of carrying out their duties ... form a kind of school for to graduate Rascals. Yes if you will give them a few Dollars they will liern you for an accomplished Rascal. This is in reference to the taxes that are rung from the labouring class of people. Without a speedy reformation I will have to resign my post."

Albion W. Tourgée, formerly of Ohio and a friend of President James A. Garfield, moved to North Carolina where he practiced as a lawyer and was appointed a judge. He once opined "Jesus Christ was a carpetbagger." Tourgée later wrote A Fool's Errand, a largely autobiographical novel about an idealistic carpetbagger persecuted by the Ku Klux Klan in North Carolina.

=== South Carolina ===
Daniel Henry Chamberlain, a New Englander who had served as an officer of a predominantly black regiment of the United States Colored Troops, was appointed attorney general from 1868 to 1872 and elected Republican governor from 1874 to 1877. As a result of the national Compromise of 1877, Chamberlain lost his office. He was narrowly re-elected in a campaign marked by egregious voter fraud and violence against freedmen by Red Shirts, who succeeded in suppressing the black vote in some majority-black counties. While serving in South Carolina, Chamberlain was a strong supporter of Negro rights.

Some historians of the early 20th century who belonged to the Dunning School that believed that the Reconstruction era was fatally flawed, claimed that Chamberlain later was influenced by Social Darwinism to become a white supremacist. They also wrote that he supported states' rights and laissez-faire in the economy. They portrayed "liberty" in 1896 as the right to rise above the rising tide of equality. Chamberlain was said to justify white supremacy by arguing that, in evolutionary terms, the Negro obviously belonged to an inferior social order.

Charles Woodward Stearns from Massachusetts wrote an account of his experience in South Carolina: The Black Man of the South, and the Rebels: Or, the Characteristics of the Former and the Recent Outrages of the Latter (1873). Francis Lewis Cardozo, a minister from New Haven, Connecticut, served as a delegate to South Carolina's 1868 constitutional convention. He made eloquent speeches advocating that the plantations be broken up and distributed among the freedmen. They wanted their own land to farm and believed they had already paid for land by their years of uncompensated labor and the trials of slavery.

=== Louisiana ===
Henry C. Warmoth was the Republican governor of Louisiana from 1868 to 1874. As governor, Warmoth was plagued by accusations of corruption, which continued to be a matter of controversy long after his death. He was accused of using his position as governor to trade in state bonds for his personal benefit. In addition, the newspaper company which he owned received a contract from the state government. Warmoth supported the franchise for freedmen.

Warmoth struggled to lead the state during the years when the White League, a white Democratic terrorist organization, conducted an open campaign of violence and intimidation against Republicans, including freedmen, with the goals of regaining Democratic power and white supremacy. They pushed Republicans from political positions, were responsible for the Coushatta Massacre, disrupted Republican organizing, and preceded elections with such intimidation and violence that black voting was sharply reduced. Warmoth stayed in Louisiana after Reconstruction, as white Democrats regained political control of the state.

George Luke Smith, a New Hampshire native, served briefly in the U.S. House from Louisiana's 4th congressional district but was unseated in 1874 by the Democrat William M. Levy. He then left Shreveport for Hot Springs, Arkansas.

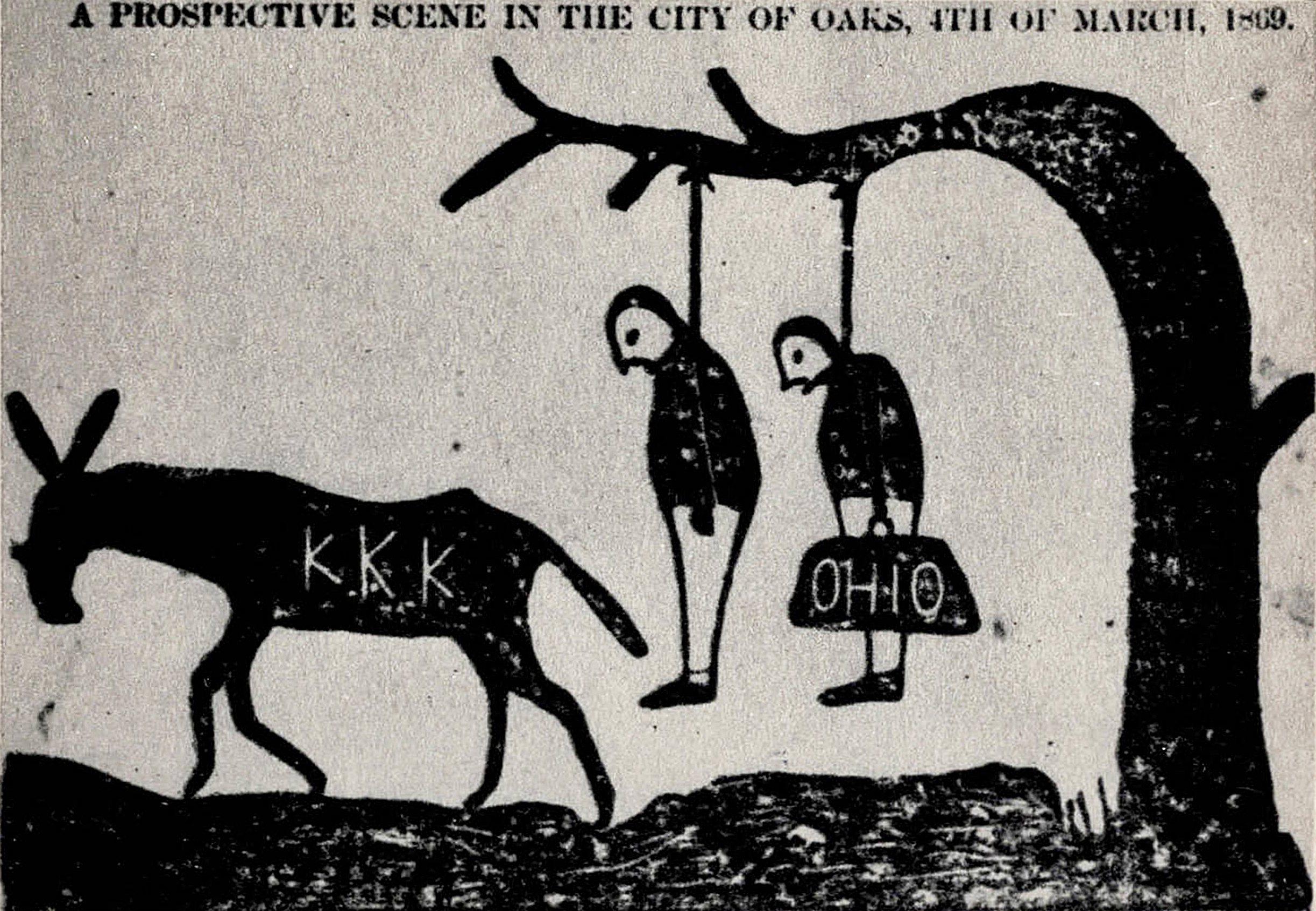
A cartoon threatening that the KKK will lynch scalawags (left) and carpetbaggers (right) on March 4, 1869, the day Horatio Seymour, a Democrat, will supposedly become president. Tuscaloosa, Alabama, Independent Monitor, September 1, 1868. The cartoonist had actual local politicians in mind. A full-scale scholarly history analyzes the cartoonː Guy W. Hubbs, Searching for Freedom after the Civil War: Klansman, Carpetbagger, Scalawag, and Freedman (2015) excerpt.

=== Alabama ===
George E. Spencer was a prominent Republican U.S. Senator. His 1872 reelection campaign in Alabama opened him to allegations of "political betrayal of colleagues; manipulation of Federal patronage; embezzlement of public funds; purchase of votes; and intimidation of voters by the presence of Federal troops." He was a major speculator in a distressed financial paper.

=== Georgia ===
Tunis Campbell, a black New York businessman, was hired in 1863 by Secretary of War Edwin M. Stanton to help former slaves in Port Royal, South Carolina. When the Civil War ended, Campbell was assigned to the Sea Islands of Georgia, where he engaged in an apparently successful land reform program for the benefit of the freedmen. He eventually became vice-chair of the Georgia Republican Party, a state senator and the head of an African-American militia which he hoped to use against the Ku Klux Klan.

=== Arkansas ===
The "Brooks–Baxter War" was a factional dispute, 1872–74 that culminated in an armed confrontation in 1874 between factions of the Arkansas Republican Party over the disputed 1872 election for governor. The victor in the end was the "Minstrel" faction led by carpetbagger Elisha Baxter over the "Brindle Tail" faction led by Joseph Brooks, which included most of the scalawags. The dispute weakened both factions and the entire Republican Party, enabling a sweeping Democratic victory in the 1874 state elections.

==== William Furbush ====
William Hines Furbush, born a mixed-race slave in Carroll County, Kentucky, received part of his education in Ohio. He migrated to Helena, Arkansas, in 1862. After returning to Ohio in February 1865, he joined the Forty-second Colored Infantry. After the war, Furbush migrated to Liberia through the American Colonization Society, where he continued to work as a photographer. He returned to Ohio after 18 months and moved back to Arkansas by 1870. Furbush was elected to two terms in the Arkansas House of Representatives, 1873–74 (from an African-American majority district in the Arkansas Delta.) He served in 1879–80 from the newly established Lee County.

In 1873, the state passed a civil rights law. Furbush and three other black leaders, including the bill's primary sponsor, state senator Richard A. Dawson, sued a barkeeper in Little Rock for refusing to serve their group. The suit resulted in the only successful Reconstruction prosecution under the state's civil rights law.

Following the end of his 1873 legislative term, Furbush was appointed as county sheriff. Furbush twice won re-election as sheriff, serving from 1873 to 1878. During his term, he adopted a policy of "fusion", a post-Reconstruction power-sharing compromise between Populist Democrats and Republicans. Furbush originally was elected as a Republican, but he switched to the Democratic Party at the end of his time as sheriff. Democrats held most of the economic power and cooperating with them could make his future.

In 1878, Furbush was elected again to the Arkansas House. His election is notable because he was elected as a black Democrat during a campaign season notorious for white intimidation of black and Republican voters in black-majority eastern Arkansas. He was the first-known black Democrat elected to the Arkansas General Assembly.

In March 1879, Furbush left Arkansas for Colorado. He returned to Arkansas in 1888, setting up practice as a lawyer. In 1889, he co-founded the African American newspaper National Democrat. He left the state in the 1890s after it disenfranchised black voters.

=== Texas ===
Carpetbaggers were least numerous in Texas. Republicans controlled the state government from 1867 to January 1874. Only one state official and one justice of the state supreme court were Northerners. About 13% to 21% of district court judges were Northerners, along with about 10% of the delegates who wrote the Reconstruction constitution of 1869. Of the 142 men who served in the 12th Legislature, some 12 to 29 were from the North. At the county level, Northerners made up about 10% of the commissioners, county judges and sheriffs.

George Thompson Ruby, an African American from New England, worked as a teacher in New Orleans from 1864 until 1866 when he migrated to Texas. There he was assigned to Galveston as an agent and teacher for the Freedmen's Bureau. Active in the Republican Party and elected as a delegate to the state constitutional convention in 1868–1869, Ruby was later elected as a Texas state senator and had wide influence. He supported construction of railroads to support Galveston business. He was instrumental in organizing African-American dockworkers into the Labor Union of Colored Men, to gain them jobs at the docks after 1870. When Democrats regained control of the state government in 1874, Ruby returned to New Orleans, working in journalism. He also became a leader of the Exoduster movement. Blacks from the Deep South migrated to homestead in Kansas in order to escape white supremacist violence and the oppression of segregation.

== Historiography ==
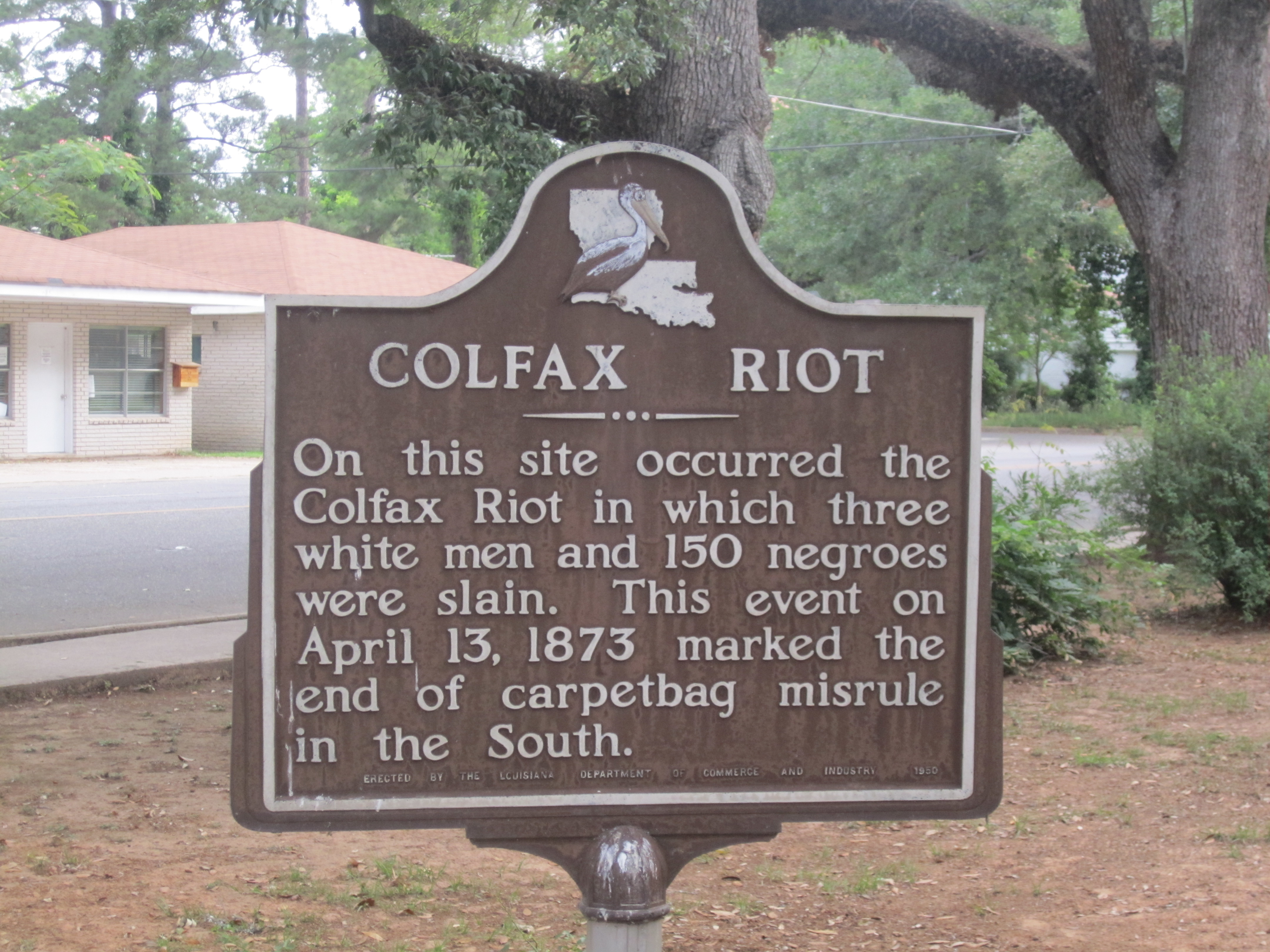
Historical marker in Colfax, Louisiana that celebrates the Colfax massacre (a mass murder of dozens of African Americans) as "the end of carpetbag misrule in the South." Erected in 1950, the sign was removed in 2021.

The Dunning school of American historians (1900–1950) espoused White supremacy and viewed "carpetbaggers" unfavorably, arguing that they degraded the political and business culture. The revisionist school in the 1930s called them stooges of Northern business interests. After 1960 the neoabolitionist school emphasized their moral courage.

== Modern use ==
=== United Kingdom ===
==== Building societies ====
In the late 1990s, carpetbagging was used as a term in Great Britain during the wave of demutualizations of building societies. It described people who joined mutual societies with the hope of making a quick profit from their conversion to joint stock companies. Those so-called carpetbaggers were roving financial opportunists, often of modest means, who spotted investment opportunities and aimed to benefit from a set of circumstances to which they were not ordinarily entitled. The best opportunities for carpetbaggers came from opening membership accounts at building societies to qualify for windfall gains, running into thousands of pounds, from the process of conversion and takeover. The influx of such transitory "token" members, who took advantage of the deposit criteria, often instigated or accelerated the demutualisation of the organisation.

The new investors in those mutuals would receive shares in the newly created public companies, usually distributed at a flat rate, which equally benefited small and large investors, providing a broad incentive for members to vote for leadership candidates who were pushing for demutualisation. Carpetbaggers first was used in this context in early 1997 by the chief executive of the Woolwich Building Society, who announced the society's conversion with rules removing the entitlement of the most recent new savers to potential windfalls, stating in a media interview, "I have no qualms about disenfranchising carpetbaggers."

Between 1997 and 2002, a group of pro-demutualization supporters, "Members for Conversion", operated a website, carpetbagger.com, which highlighted the best ways of opening share accounts with UK building societies, and organised demutualisation resolutions. That led many building societies to implement anti-carpetbagging policies, such as not accepting new deposits from customers who lived outside the normal operating area of the society. Another measure was to insert a charitable assignment clause for new members into the constitution of the organisation, requiring customers opening a savings account to sign a declaration agreeing that any windfall conversion benefits to which they might become entitled would be assigned to the Charities Aid Foundation.

The term continues to be used within the co-operative movement to, for example, refer to the demutualisation of housing cooperatives.

==== UK politics ====
The analogous term to carpetbagging in Britain is "chicken run", to denote an MP running in a safer constituency to seek re-election. The term was first used by the Labour Party to describe Norman Lamont's move from Kingston-upon-Thames in London to Harrogate and Knaresborough in North Yorkshire. The term has been used at subsequent elections, to describe MPs including Shaun Woodward (Witney to St Helens South), Mims Davies (Eastleigh to Mid Sussex), Kieran Mullan (Crewe and Nantwich to Bexhill and Battle), and Richard Holden (North West Durham to Basildon and Billericay).

The term carpetbagger has also been applied to those who join the Labour Party but lack roots in the working class that the party was formed to represent.

=== World War II ===
During World War II, the U.S. Office of Strategic Services surreptitiously supplied necessary tools and materials to resistance groups in Europe. The OSS called this effort Operation Carpetbagger. The modified B-24 aircraft used for the night-time missions were referred to as "carpetbaggers". (Among other special features, they were painted a glossy black to make them less visible to searchlights.) Between January and September 1944, Operation Carpetbagger operated 1,860 sorties between RAF Harrington, England, and various points in occupied Europe. British Agents used this "noise" as cover for their use of Carpetbagger for the nominated Agent who was carrying monies [authentic and counterfeit] to the Underground/Resistance.

=== Australia ===
In Australia, "carpetbagger" may refer to unscrupulous dealers and business managers in indigenous Australian art.

The term was also used by John Fahey, a former Premier of New South Wales and federal Liberal finance minister, in the context of shoddy "tradespeople" who travelled to Queensland to take advantage of victims following the 2010–2011 Queensland floods.

=== United States ===
In the United States, the common modern usage, usually derogatory, refers to politicians who move to different states, districts or areas to run for office despite their lack of local ties or familiarity. The term is now sometimes even used for politicians who relocate from the South to the North for politically opportunistic reasons. For example, former Arkansas First Lady Hillary Clinton was attacked by opponents as carpetbagging because she never resided in New York State or participated in the state's politics before the 2000 Senate race; Republican candidate and New York City mayor Rudy Giuliani mocked Clinton by putting an Arkansas flag on top of the New York City Hall.

Notable examples

- In 2014, West Virginia Congressman Alex Mooney was attacked as a carpetbagger when he first ran for Congress, as he had previously been a Maryland State Senator and Chairman of the Maryland Republican Party.
- In 2022, Republican nominee for Pennsylvania Senator Mehmet Oz was prominently attacked as a carpetbagger by his opponent John Fetterman for previously living in New Jersey until months before the election. Fetterman won the election, with some claiming that this attack was vital to his victory.
- Ahead of the 2024 United States House of Representatives elections in Colorado, Republican representative Lauren Boebert of Colorado's 3rd congressional district was accused of carpetbagging after switching to the less-competitive 4th district for reelection.
- In 2025, incumbent Republican representative Randy Fine, who represents Florida's 6th congressional district, drew fire from other Republicans (including Charles Gambaro and Ron DeSantis) for living outside of his district. Fine's primary residence lies in Melbourne Beach, which is outside the 6th district.

=== Cuisine ===
A carpetbag steak or carpetbagger steak is an end cut of steak that is pocketed and stuffed with oysters, among other ingredients, such as mushrooms, blue cheese, and garlic. The steak is sutured with toothpicks or thread, and it sometimes is wrapped in bacon. The combination of beef and oysters is traditional. The earliest specific reference is in a United States newspaper in 1891. The earliest specific Australian reference is a printed recipe sometime between 1899 and 1907.

=== French politics ===
In French politics, carpetbagging is known as parachutage, which means parachuting in French.

== See also ==
- Rootless cosmopolitans
- The Carpetbaggers
