= 114th United States Colored Infantry Regiment =

114th Regiment U.S. Colored Troops
- Flag of the United States (1863–1865)
- Active: July 4, 1864 – April 2, 1867
- Country: United States
- Allegiance: Union
- Branch: Union Army; United States Colored Troops
- Type: Infantry
- Engagements: Siege of Petersburg; Battle of Hatcher's Run; Appomattox Campaign

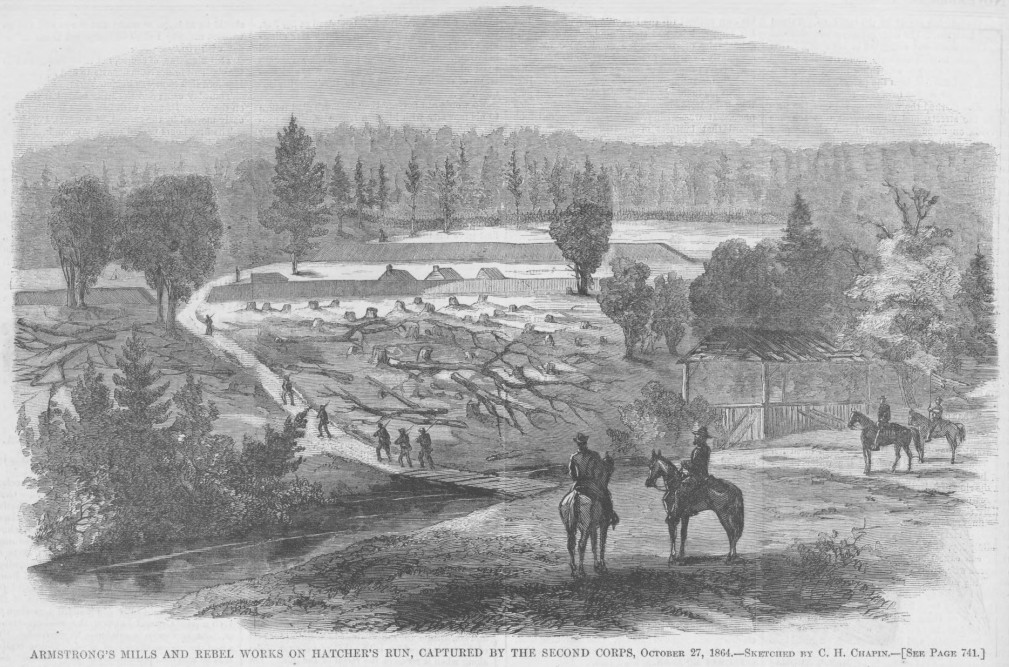
Armstrong's Mills and Rebel works on Hatcher's Run, where the regiment saw action at.

The 114th United States Colored Infantry, was an infantry regiment of the United States Colored Troops that served with the Union Army during the latter stages of the American Civil War.

== Organization ==
The 114th USCI was organized at Camp Nelson, Kentucky, on July 4, 1864. It was one of eight black regiments formed at the camp, which served as a major recruitment and training center for African American soldiers in the region. Upon its formation, it was initially attached to the Military District of Kentucky within the Department of Ohio.

== Service ==
=== Early service ===
For the remainder of 1864, the regiment conducted garrison and guard duties at Camp Nelson and Louisa, Kentucky. In early January 1865, the regiment was transferred to the Department of Virginia to take part in the Eastern Theater.

=== Virginia Campaign ===
Upon arriving in Virginia, it was attached to the 3rd Brigade, 1st Division, of the XXV Corps.

The regiment would take part in siege operations against Petersburg and Richmond. On March 28, the regiment would move along with the Army of the James. It saw action at Hatcher's Run and witnessed the fall of Petersburg on April 2.

The 114th USCI was among the first federal regiments to enter the Confederate capital of Richmond following its abandonment by Confederate forces. They would later take part in the Appomattox Campaign, culminating at the Battle of Appomattox Court House on April 9, 1865. The regiment was present for the formal surrender.

=== Post-war service ===
Following the end of the war, the regiment remained on duty at Petersburg and City Point until June 1865. During this time, it was attached to the 2nd Brigade, 1st Division of the XXV Corps.

The regiment was ordered to the Department of Texas, and would move to Texas via sea in July and June, and was stationed at Brownsville and at various other points along the Rio Grande.

The regiment would conduct occupation and border duty in Texas until April, 1867.

The regiment was mustered out of service on April 2, 1867.

== Commanders ==
- Colonel Thomas D. Sedgwick (Later to demoted Lieutenant Colonel on September 8)
- Major A.J Hogan

== See also ==
- List of United States Colored Troops units in the American Civil War
