= Alexander M. York =

American politician

Alexander M. York (1838 – February 25, 1928) was an American politician and Lieutenant Colonel in the Union army.

York commanded in the 15th United States Colored Infantry Regiment until it was mustered out of service in 1866.

York went on to serve in the Kansas State Senate from 1873–1874 in Independence, Kansas, in Montgomery County, Kansas. He died of nephritis in 1928.
