= 115th United States Colored Infantry Regiment =

- Active: July 15 to October 21, 1864 – February 10, 1866
- Country: United States
- Allegiance: Union
- Branch: Union Army; United States Colored Troops
- Type: Infantry
- Size: Regiment
- Engagements: Siege of Petersburg

The 115th United States Colored Infantry Regiment was an infantry regiment that served with the USCT during the American Civil War. They would initially conduct garrison duty at Lexington, Kentucky, before taking part in the Siege of Petersburg-Richmond, and finally moving to Texas to conduct duty until they were mustered out of service.

== Service ==
The regiment was Bowling Green, Kentucky, from July 15 to October 21, 1864, and was initially attached to the 2nd Brigade, 2nd Division, District of Kentucky, 5th Division, XXIII Corps, Department of the Ohio. It was initially assigned to garrison duty at Lexington, Kentucky, until December 1865, when they were ordered to Virginia.

During January 1865, the regiment was attached to the 2nd Brigade, 2nd Division, of the XXIII Corps and would take part in the Siege of Petersburg-Richmond. After the siege, they were sent for occupation duty in Richmond until May 1865.

On May 20, they were sent to Texas, and from there, they would spend the rest of their service conducting duty in the District of the Rio Grande until February, 1866.

The regiment was mustered out of service on February 10, 1866.

== Commanders ==
- Colonel George T. Elder
- Major James A. Johnson

== See also ==
- List of United States Colored Troops units in the American Civil War
