= 13th United States Colored Infantry Regiment =

13th United States Colored Infantry
- Active: November 19, 1863 - January 10, 1866
- Country: United States
- Allegiance: Union
- Branch: Infantry
- Engagements: Battle of Nashville

The 13th United States Colored Infantry was an infantry regiment that served in the Union Army during the American Civil War. The regiment was composed of African American enlisted men commanded by white officers and was authorized by the Bureau of Colored Troops which was created by the United States War Department on May 22, 1863.

== Service ==
The 13th U.S. Colored Infantry was organized in Nashville, Tennessee November 19, 1863 and mustered in for three-year service under the command of Colonel John A. Hottenstein.

The regiment was attached to Defenses Nashville & Northwestern Railroad, Department of the Cumberland, to November 1864. 2nd Colored Brigade, District of the Etowah, Department of the Cumberland, to January 1865. Defenses Nashville & Northwestern Railroad, District Middle Tennessee, Department of the Cumberland, to May 1865. 3rd Sub-District, District Middle Tennessee, Department of the Cumberland, to January 1866.

The 13th U.S. Colored Infantry mustered out of service January 10, 1866.

== Detailed service ==
Railroad guard duty in Tennessee and Alabama on line of Nashville & Northwestern Railroad until December 1864. Repulse of Hood's attack on Johnsonville, Tenn., September 25 and November 4 and 5. Eddyville, Ky., October 17 (detachment). Battle of Nashville December 15–16. Pursuit of Hood to the Tennessee River December 17–18. Railroad guard and garrison duty in the Department of the Cumberland until January 1866.

== Casualties ==
At the Battle of Nashville, the regiment lost 221 men, the most of any regiment that day, Union or Confederate. The regiment lost a total of 355 men during service; 4 officers and 86 enlisted men killed or mortally wounded, 265 enlisted men died of disease.

== Commanders ==
- Colonel John A. Hottenstein

== See also ==
- List of United States Colored Troops Civil War Units
- United States Colored Troops
