= 1st United States Colored Cavalry Regiment =

- Active: 1863–1866
- Country: United States
- Allegiance: United States Union
- Branch: Cavalry; United States Colored Troops
- Size: Regiment
- Engagements: American Civil War: Bermuda Hundred Campaign; Overland Campaign; Siege of Petersburg

The 1st United States Colored Cavalry Regiment was a regiment of the Union army composed of African-American troops that served in Virginia during the American Civil War.

== Unit history ==
The 1st Colored Cavalry was formed at Camp Hamilton, Virginia on December 22, 1863. Many of the men were escaped slaves from Virginia, the United States Colored Troops was established in May, 1863 to allow both free people of color and former slaves to enlist in the army.

In August, 1864, the regiment was assigned to duty working in Virginia military hospitals, guarding quartermaster and commissary stores, and serving as provost guard. Black troops were often used for manual labor or guard duty due to the attitude of white officers who felt they weren't fit for combat. Despite primarily serving in non-combat duties, the 1st Colored Cavalry fought 6 engagements in Virginia. Casualties included 2 killed and 1 wounded at Bermuda Hundred, 3 missing at Smithfield, 2 killed at Wilson's Landing, 2 killed at Fort Pocahontas, 2 killed at Cabin Point, 3 killed, 16 wounded at Powhatan. Often the companies of the 1st Colored Cavalry regiment were deployed at different points separately, operating as dismounted infantry.

The 1st Colored Cavalry was assigned to XXV Corps, commanded by General Godfrey Weitzel. In May, 1865, following the fall of the Confederate capital and the surrender of Robert E. Lee's army in Virginia, the XXV Corps was dispatched to guard the Mexican border in South Texas. Following the end of the war, the government began downsizing the army, and the 1st Colored Cavalry was mustered out of service on February 4, 1866.

== Commanders ==
All officers of the United States Colored Troops during the Civil War were white; Black soldiers would not be commissioned as officers in the US Army until after the war.
Commanding officers of the 1st US Colored Cavalry:

- Col. Jeptha Garrard
- Lt. Col. William H. Seip
- Maj. Archibald McIntyre

== See also ==
- List of United States Colored Troops Civil War Units
- United States Colored Troops
