= 138th United States Colored Infantry Regiment =

- Flag of the United States (1865-1867)
- Active: July 15, 1866 – January 6, 1866
- Country: United States
- Allegiance: Union
- Branch: Infantry
- Engagements: None

The 138th United States Colored Infantry Regiment, was an infantry regiment of the USCT during the American Civil War. Organized in the Final months of the war.

== Service ==
The regiment was organized at Atlanta, Georgia, on July 15, 1865, just after the surrender of the major Confederate armies at Appomattox and Bennett Place. As a result, the 138th didn't take part in combat operations. They were instead assigned to duty within the Department of Georgia.

The 138th USCT was mustered out of service on January 6, 1866, after 6 months of service.

== Commanders ==
- Colonel Frederick W. Benteen
- Lieutenant George Curkendall
- John A. Picker.

== See also ==
- List of United States Colored Troops units in the American Civil War
