= 81st Regiment Infantry U.S. Colored Troops =

Union Army unit of the American Civil War

81st United States Colored Infantry Regiment 9th Corps d'Afrique Infantry Regiment
- Active: 1863–1866
- Country: United States
- Allegiance: United States Union
- Branch: Infantry; United States Colored Troops
- Size: Regiment
- Engagements: American Civil War

The 81st Regiment Infantry U.S. Colored Troops was a regiment of United States Colored Troops during the American Civil War. Initially formed as the 9th Infantry, Corps d'Afrique on September 2, 1863, the regiment was re-designated as the 81st Regiment Infantry on April 4, 1864. It primarily served at Port Hudson, Louisiana, and was mustered out on November 30, 1866.

== Formation and Service ==
The regiment was originally organized as the 9th Infantry of the Corps d'Afrique, which was created by Major General Nathaniel P. Banks to recruit Black soldiers in Louisiana following the Union capture of New Orleans. The regiment was stationed at Port Hudson, Louisiana, a major strongpoint along the Mississippi river that had been captured by Union forces in July, 1863. Many of the recruits were escaped slaves who only spoke French, which was a challenge for the Northern officers assigned to prepare them to meet military standards.

Newly-recruited regiments of Black soldiers were assigned to garrison duties to hold strategic points along the Mississippi River and free up veteran Union regiments for service elsewhere. General Henry Halleck wrote to Ulysses S. Grant in July 1863, shortly after the capture of Vicksburg, expressing his opinion that the regiments of Black soldiers would be suitable for this assignment: “The Mississippi should be the base of future operations east and west. When Port Hudson falls, the fortifications of that place, as well as of Vicksburg, should be so arranged as to be held by the smallest possible garrisons, thus leaving the mass of troops for operations in the field. I suggest that colored troops be used as far as possible in the garrisons."

On April 4, 1864, the regiment was redesignated as the 81st Regiment Infantry U.S. Colored Troops. It remained on duty in Louisiana for the remainder of the war.

== Operations ==
John F. Appleton of Maine served as the first commanding officer of the 81st Regiment. Despite its readiness and training, the regiment did not engage in direct combat during its service. Its primary responsibilities involved garrison duties and support roles within the Union's military structure in Louisiana. In February 1865, the 82nd Infantry was reported by General William A. Pile to be: "perhaps the best colored regiment in this department," and General Pile requested the 82nd be sent to Pensacola, Florida to prepare for the siege of Fort Blakeley. However, this request was denied and the regiment did not join this operation.

== Commanders ==
Commanding officers of the 9th Corps d'Afrique/81st Colored Infantry:

- Colonel John F. Appleton, resigned July 1864, awarded brevet brigadier general, March 1865.
- Colonel Edward Martindale, resigned August 1865.
- Colonel Charles B. Gaskill, resigned December 1865.
- Colonel Samuel M. Quincy
- Lieutenant Colonel Isaac S. Bangs, resigned July 1864, awarded brevet brigadier general, March 1865.
- Lieutenant Colonel Oliver N. Blackington

== See also ==
- List of United States Colored Troops Civil War units
- Siege of Port Hudson
