= 12th United States Colored Infantry Regiment =

12th United States Colored Infantry
- Active: July 24, 1863 - January 1866
- Country: United States
- Allegiance: Union
- Branch: Infantry
- Engagements: Battle of Nashville

The 12th United States Colored Infantry was an infantry regiment that served in the Union Army during the American Civil War. The regiment was composed of African American enlisted men commanded by white officers and was authorized by the Bureau of Colored Troops which was created by the United States War Department on May 22, 1863.

== Service ==
The 12th U.S. Colored Infantry was recruited in Tennessee July 24 through August 14, 1863 and mustered in for three-year service under the command of Colonel Charles Robinson Thompson.

The regiment was attached to Defenses of Nashville & Northwestern Railroad, Department of the Cumberland, to October 1864. 2nd Colored Brigade, District of the Etowah, Department of the Cumberland, to January 1865. Defenses of Nashville & Northwestern Railroad, District of Middle Tennessee, to May 1865. 3rd Sub-District, District Middle Tennessee, Department of the Cumberland, to January 1866.

The 12th U.S. Colored Infantry mustered out of service in January 1866.

== Detailed service ==
Railroad guard duty at various points in Tennessee and Alabama on line of the Nashville & Northwestern Railroad until December 1864. Repulse of Hood's attack on Johnsonville November 2, 4 and 5. Action at Buford's Station, Section 37, Nashville & Northwestern Railroad, November 24. March to Clarksville, Tenn., and skirmish near that place December 2. Battle of Nashville December 15–16. Pursuit of Hood to the Tennessee River December 17–28. Action at Decatur, Ala., December 27–28. Railroad guard and garrison duty in the Department of the Cumberland until January 1866.

== Casualties ==
The regiment lost a total of 284 men during service; 4 officers and 38 enlisted men killed or mortally wounded, 242 enlisted men died of disease.

== Commanders ==
- Colonel Charles Robinson Thompson
- Lieutenant Colonel William R. Sellon - commanded at the Battle of Nashville
- Captain Joseph Dawson Jagger - wounded at the Battle of Nashville

== See also ==
- List of United States Colored Troops Civil War Units
- United States Colored Troops
