= 136th United States Colored Infantry Regiment =

- Flag of the United States (1865–1867)
- Active: July 15 1865 - January 4, 1866
- Country: United States
- Allegiance: Union
- Branch: United States Colored Troops; Infantry
- Engagements: None

The 136th United States Colored Infantry Regiment was an infantry regiment that served in the USCT during the American Civil War.

== Service ==
The regiment was organized at Atlanta, Georgia, on July 15, 1865. The regiment conducted duty in the Department of Georgia until January 4, 1866.

The regiment was mustered out of service on January 4, 1866.

== Commanders ==
- Colonel Richard Root
- Lieutenant Colonel Andrew J. Jones
- Major Walter Whittemore

== See also ==
- List of United States Colored Troops units in the American Civil War
