= 16th United States Colored Infantry Regiment =

16th United States Colored Infantry
- Active: December 4, 1863 - April 30, 1866
- Country: United States
- Allegiance: Union
- Branch: Infantry
- Engagements: Battle of Nashville

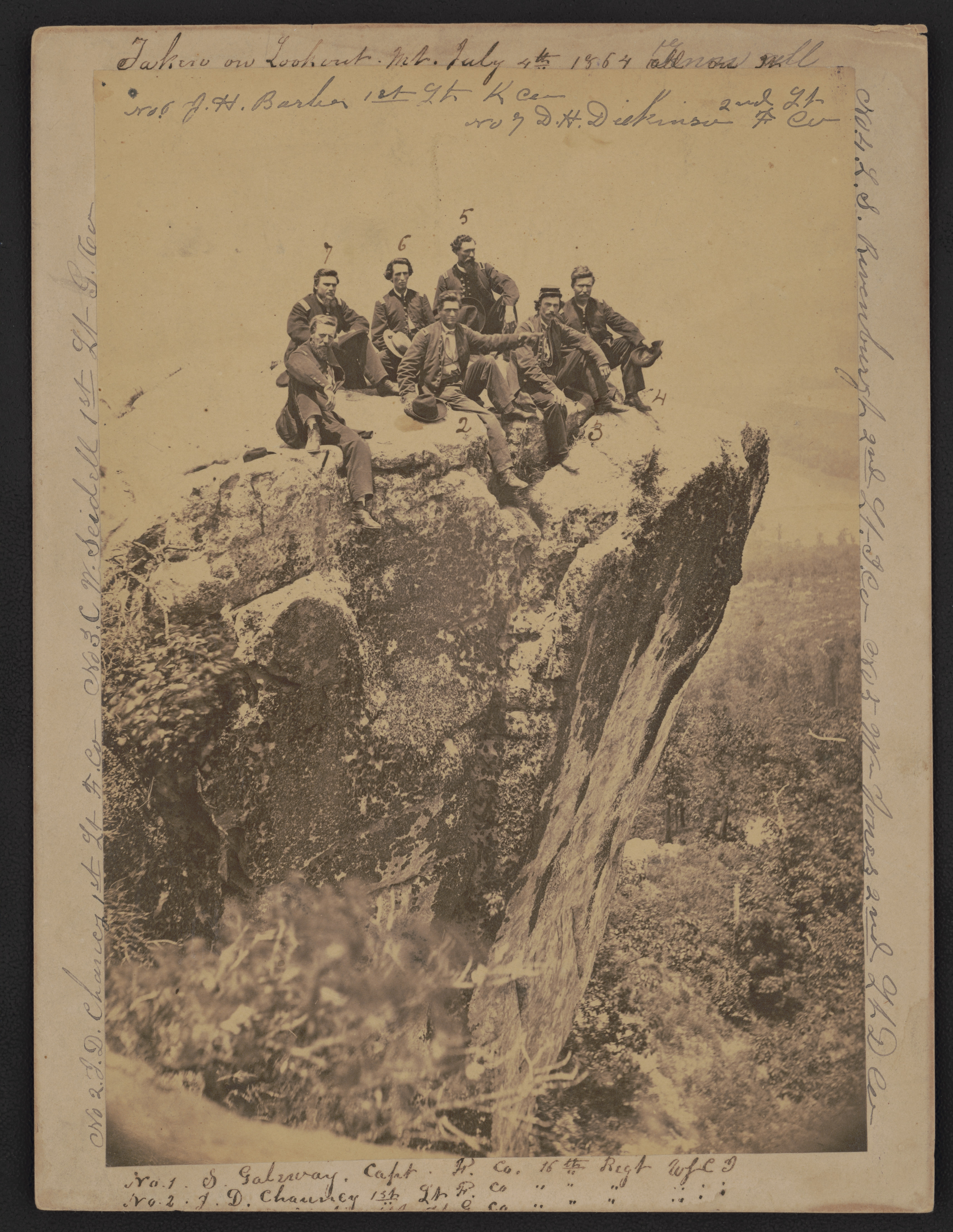
Officers of the 16th U.S. Colored Troops Infantry Regiment atop Lookout Mountain, Tennessee. From the Liljenquist Family Collection of Civil War Photographs, Prints and Photographs Division, Library of Congress

The 16th United States Colored Infantry was an infantry regiment that served in the Union Army during the American Civil War. The regiment was composed of African American enlisted men commanded by white officers and was authorized by the Bureau of Colored Troops which was created by the United States War Department on May 22, 1863.

== Service ==
The 16th U.S. Colored Infantry was organized in Nashville, Tennessee beginning December 4, 1863 and mustered in for three-year service under the command of Colonel William B. Gaw.

The regiment was attached to Post of Chattanooga, Department of the Cumberland, to November 1864. Unattached, District of the Etowah, Department of the Cumberland, to December 1864. 1st Colored Brigade, District of the Etowah, Department of the Cumberland, to January 1865. Unattached, District of the Etowah, to March 1865. 1st Colored Brigade, Department of the Cumberland, to April 1865. 5th Sub-District, District of Middle Tennessee, to July 1865. 2nd Brigade, 4th Division, District of East Tennessee and Department of the Cumberland to April 1866.

The 16th U.S. Colored Infantry mustered out of service April 30, 1866.

== Detailed service ==
Duty at Chattanooga, Tennessee, until November 1864. Battle of Nashville, December 15–16. Overton Hill December 16. Pursuit of Hood to the Tennessee River December 17–28. Duty at Chattanooga and in middle and eastern Tennessee until April 1866.

== Commanders ==
- Colonel William B. Gaw

== See also ==
- List of United States Colored Troops Civil War Units
- United States Colored Troops
