= List of United States Colored Troops units in the American Civil War =

This article provides a comprehensive overview of the units from the United States Colored Troops that served during the American Civil War.

Flag of the United States (1863–1865)

== Infantry ==
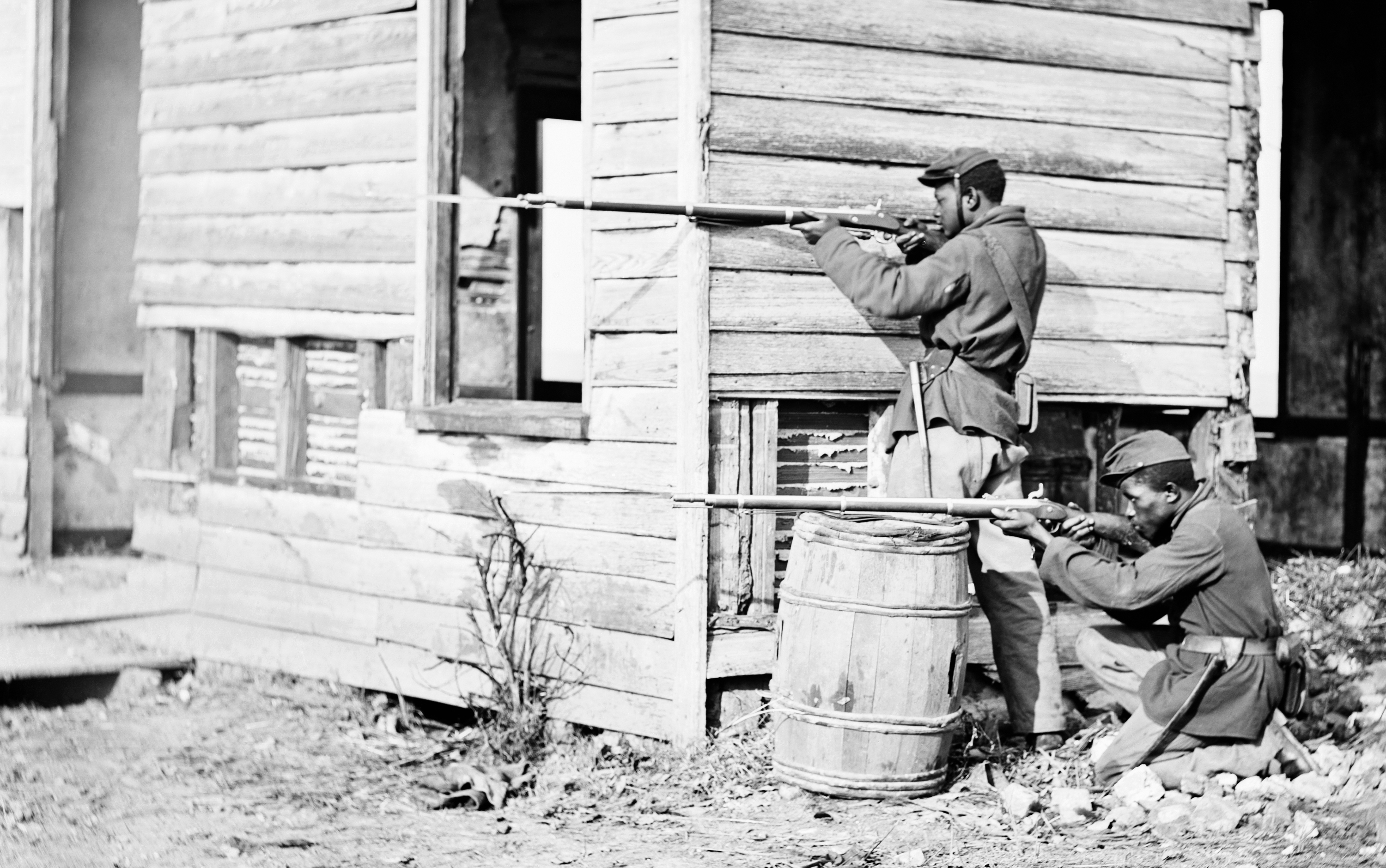
United States Colored Troops skirmishing in Dutch Gap, Virginia, 1864

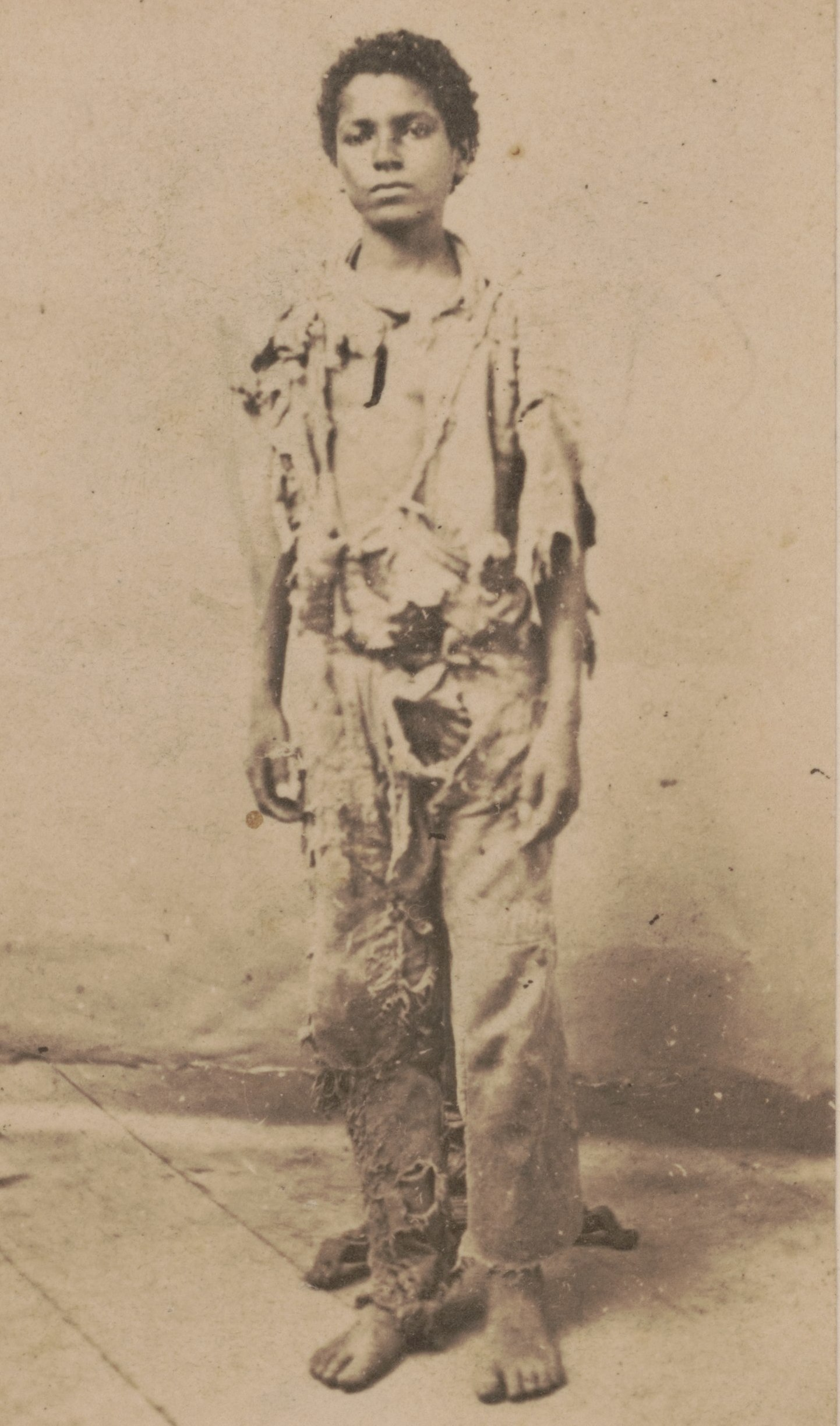
Taylor, young drummer boy for 78th Colored Troops Infantry, in rags

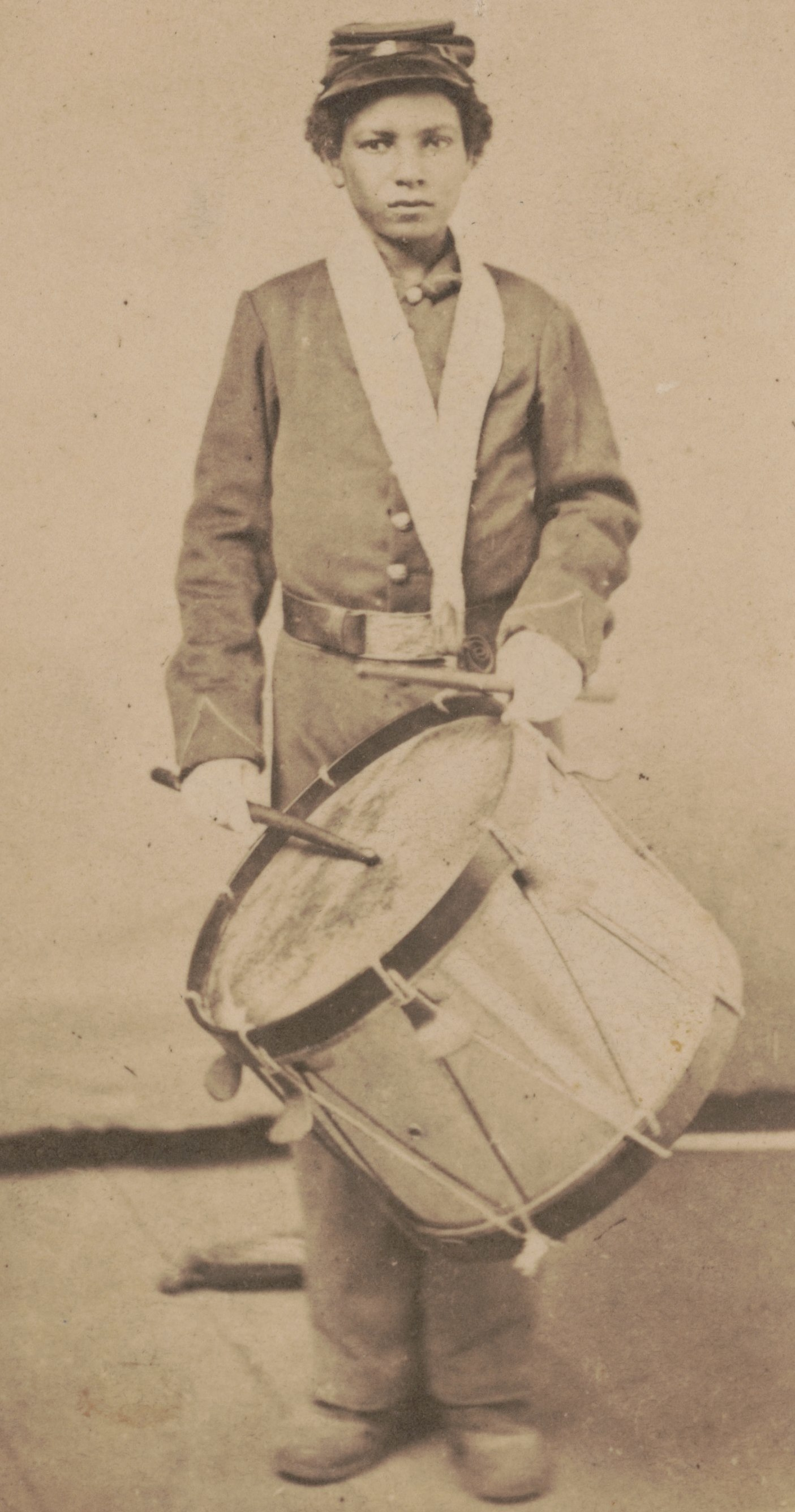
Taylor, young drummer boy for 78th Colored Troops Infantry, in uniform with drum

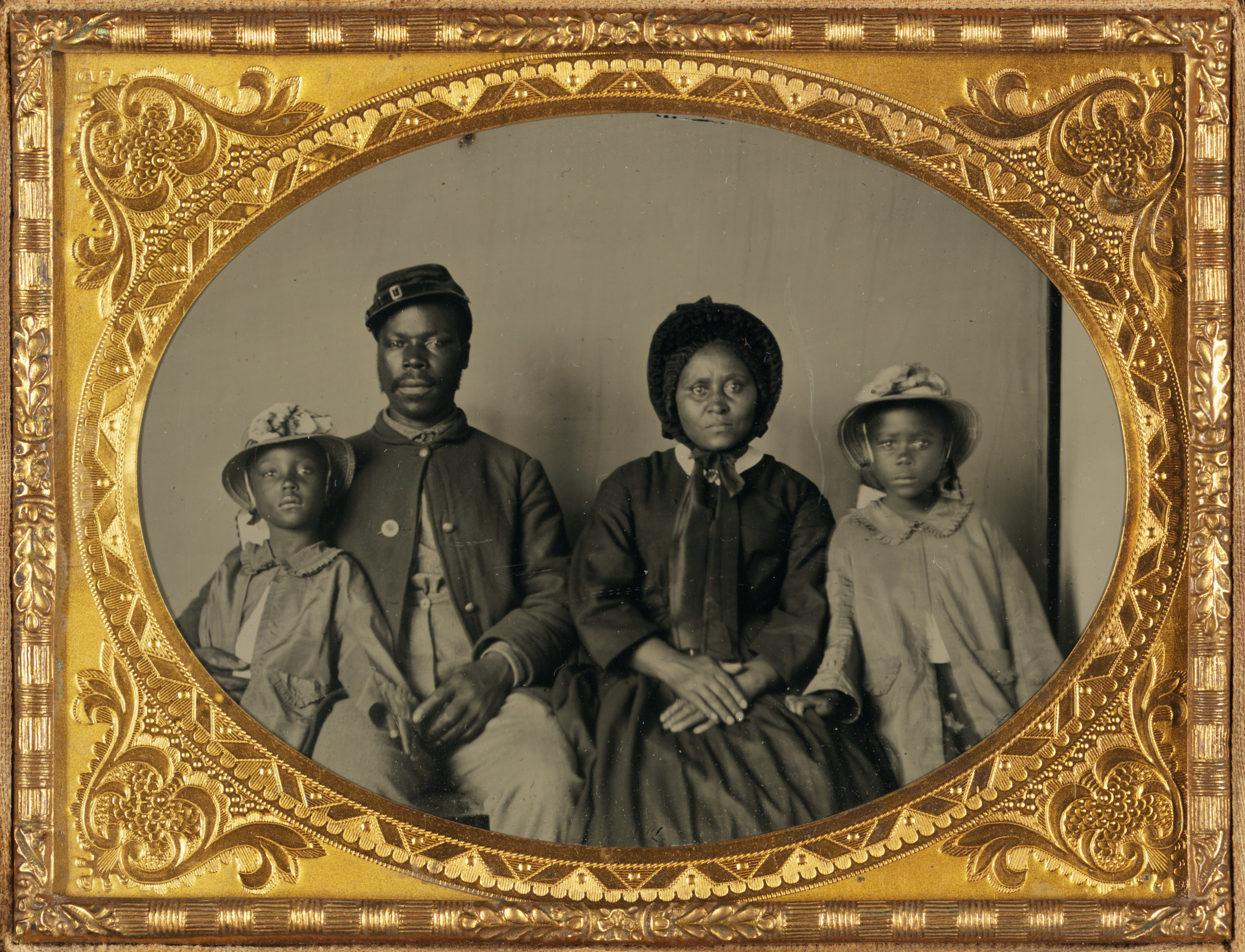
Union soldier in uniform with family-recently Identified as Sgt Samuel Smith of the 119th USCT and family

- 1st Regiment Infantry U.S. Colored Troops
- 2nd Regiment Infantry U.S. Colored Troops
- 3rd Regiment Infantry U.S. Colored Troops
- 4th Regiment Infantry U.S. Colored Troops
- 5th Regiment Infantry U.S. Colored Troops – Formerly 127th Ohio Volunteer Infantry Regiment
- 6th Regiment Infantry U.S. Colored Troops
- 7th Regiment Infantry U.S. Colored Troops
- 8th Regiment Infantry U.S. Colored Troops
- 9th Regiment Infantry U.S. Colored Troops
- 10th Regiment Infantry U.S. Colored Troops
- 11th Regiment Infantry U.S. Colored Troops (Old)
- 11th Regiment Infantry U.S. Colored Troops (New)
- 12th Regiment Infantry U.S. Colored Troops
- 13th Regiment Infantry U.S. Colored Troops
- 14th Regiment Infantry U.S. Colored Troops
- 15th Regiment Infantry U.S. Colored Troops
- 16th Regiment Infantry U.S. Colored Troops
- 17th Regiment Infantry U.S. Colored Troops
- 18th Regiment Infantry U.S. Colored Troops
- 19th Regiment Infantry U.S. Colored Troops
- 20th Regiment Infantry U.S. Colored Troops
- 21st Regiment Infantry U.S. Colored Troops
- 22nd Regiment Infantry U.S. Colored Troops
- 23rd Regiment Infantry U.S. Colored Troops
- 24th Regiment Infantry U.S. Colored Troops
- 25th Regiment Infantry U.S. Colored Troops
- 26th Regiment Infantry U.S. Colored Troops
- 27th Regiment Infantry U.S. Colored Troops
- 28th Regiment Infantry U.S. Colored Troops
- 29th Regiment Infantry U.S. Colored Troops
- 30th Regiment Infantry U.S. Colored Troops
- 31st Regiment Infantry U.S. Colored Troops
- 32nd Regiment Infantry U.S. Colored Troops
- 33rd Regiment Infantry U.S. Colored Troops - Formerly 1st South Carolina Colored Infantry Regiment
- 34th Regiment Infantry U.S. Colored Troops
- 35th Regiment Infantry U.S. Colored Troops
- 36th Regiment Infantry U.S. Colored Troops
- 37th Regiment Infantry U.S. Colored Troops
- 38th Regiment Infantry U.S. Colored Troops
- 39th Regiment Infantry U.S. Colored Troops
- 40th Regiment Infantry U.S. Colored Troops
- 41st Regiment Infantry U.S. Colored Troops
- 42nd Regiment Infantry U.S. Colored Troops
- 43rd Regiment Infantry U.S. Colored Troops
- 44th Regiment Infantry U.S. Colored Troops
- 45th Regiment Infantry U.S. Colored Troops
- 46th Regiment Infantry U.S. Colored Troops
- 47th Regiment Infantry U.S. Colored Troops
- 48th Regiment Infantry U.S. Colored Troops
- 49th Regiment Infantry U.S. Colored Troops
- 50th Regiment Infantry U.S. Colored Troops
- 51st Regiment Infantry U.S. Colored Troops – Formerly 1st Mississippi Infantry Regiment (African Descent)
- 52nd Regiment Infantry U.S. Colored Troops – Formerly 2nd Mississippi Infantry Regiment (African Descent)
- 53rd Regiment Infantry U.S. Colored Troops – Formerly 3rd Mississippi Infantry Regiment (African Descent)
- 54th Regiment Infantry U.S. Colored Troops
- 55th Regiment Infantry U.S. Colored Troops
- 56th Regiment Infantry U.S. Colored Troops
- 57th Regiment Infantry U.S. Colored Troops
- 58th Regiment Infantry U.S. Colored Troops – Formerly 6th Mississippi Infantry Regiment (African Descent)
- 59th Regiment Infantry U.S. Colored Troops
- 60th Regiment Infantry U.S. Colored Troops
- 61st Regiment Infantry U.S. Colored Troops
- 62nd Regiment Infantry U.S. Colored Troops – Originally 1st Missouri Colored Infantry
- 63rd Regiment Infantry U.S. Colored Troops
- 64th Regiment Infantry U.S. Colored Troops
- 65th Regiment Infantry U.S. Colored Troops – Originally 2nd Missouri Colored Infantry
- 66th Regiment Infantry U.S. Colored Troops – Formerly 4th Mississippi Infantry Regiment (African Descent)
- 67th Regiment Infantry U.S. Colored Troops – Originally 3rd Missouri Colored Infantry
- 68th Regiment Infantry U.S. Colored Troops – Originally 4th Missouri Colored Infantry
- 69th Regiment Infantry U.S. Colored Troops - Failed to complete organization.
- 70th Regiment Infantry U.S. Colored Troops
- 71st Regiment Infantry U.S. Colored Troops
- 72nd Regiment Infantry U.S. Colored Troops - Disbanded shortly after formation
- 73rd Regiment Infantry U.S. Colored Troops
- 74th Regiment Infantry U.S. Colored Troops
- 75th Regiment Infantry U.S. Colored Troops
- 76th Regiment Infantry U.S. Colored Troops
- 77th Regiment Infantry U.S. Colored Troops
- 78th Regiment Infantry U.S. Colored Troops
- 79th Regiment Infantry U.S. Colored Troops - 1st Kansas Colored Infantry
- 80th Regiment Infantry U.S. Colored Troops
- 81st Regiment Infantry U.S. Colored Troops
- 82nd Regiment Infantry U.S. Colored Troops
- 83rd Regiment Infantry U.S. Colored Troops - 2nd Kansas Colored Infantry
- 84th Regiment Infantry U.S. Colored Troops
- 85th Regiment Infantry U.S. Colored Troops - Failed to complete organization
- 86th Regiment Infantry U.S. Colored Troops
- 87th Regiment Infantry U.S. Colored Troops
- 88th Regiment Infantry U.S. Colored Troops
- 89th Regiment Infantry U.S. Colored Troops
- 90th Regiment Infantry U.S. Colored Troops - Failed to complete organization
- 91st Regiment Infantry U.S. Colored Troops
- 92nd Regiment Infantry U.S. Colored Troops
- 93rd Regiment Infantry U.S. Colored Troops
- 94th Regiment Infantry U.S. Colored Troops - Failed to complete organization.
- 95th Regiment Infantry U.S. Colored Troops
- 96th Regiment Infantry U.S. Colored Troops
- 97th Regiment Infantry U.S. Colored Troops
- 98th Regiment Infantry U.S. Colored Troops
- 99th Regiment Infantry U.S. Colored Troops
- 100th Regiment Infantry U.S. Colored Troops
- 101st Regiment Infantry U.S. Colored Troops
- 102nd Regiment Infantry U.S. Colored Troops - Originally the 1st Michigan Colored Infantry
- 103rd Regiment Infantry U.S. Colored Troops - Disbanded shortly after formation
- 104th Regiment Infantry U.S. Colored Troops
- 105th Regiment Infantry U.S. Colored Troops - Failed to complete organization.
- 106th Regiment Infantry U.S. Colored Troops
- 107th Regiment Infantry U.S. Colored Troops
- 108th Regiment Infantry U.S. Colored Troops
- 109th Regiment Infantry U.S. Colored Troops
- 110th Regiment Infantry U.S. Colored Troops
- 111th Regiment Infantry U.S. Colored Troops
- 112th Regiment Infantry U.S. Colored Troops
- 113th Regiment Infantry U.S. Colored Troops
- 114th Regiment Infantry U.S. Colored Troops
- 115th Regiment Infantry U.S. Colored Troops
- 116th Regiment Infantry U.S. Colored Troops
- 117th Regiment Infantry U.S. Colored Troops
- 118th Regiment Infantry U.S. Colored Troops
- 119th Regiment Infantry U.S. Colored Troops
- 120th Regiment Infantry U.S. Colored Troops
- 121st Regiment Infantry U.S. Colored Troops
- 122nd Regiment Infantry U.S. Colored Troops
- 123rd Regiment Infantry U.S. Colored Troops
- 124th Regiment Infantry U.S. Colored Troops
- 125th Regiment Infantry U.S. Colored Troops
- 126th Regiment Infantry U.S. Colored Troops - Not organized.
- 127th Regiment Infantry U.S. Colored Troops
- 128th Regiment Infantry U.S. Colored Troops
- 135th Regiment Infantry U.S. Colored Troops
- 136th Regiment Infantry U.S. Colored Troops
- 137th Regiment Infantry U.S. Colored Troops
- 138th Regiment Infantry U.S. Colored Troops

== Cavalry ==
- 1st Regiment Cavalry U.S. Colored Troops
- 2nd Regiment Cavalry U.S. Colored Troops
- 3rd Regiment Cavalry U.S. Colored Troops – Formerly 1st Mississippi Cavalry Regiment (African Descent)
- 4th Regiment Cavalry U.S. Colored Troops – Formerly 1st Cavalry, Corps d'Afrique
- 5th Regiment Cavalry U.S. Colored Troops
- 6th Regiment Cavalry U.S. Colored Troops

== Artillery ==
- 1st Regiment Heavy Artillery U.S. Colored Troops
- 2nd Regiment Light Artillery U.S. Colored Troops
- 2nd Regiment Heavy Artillery African Descent (renamed to 3rd Regiment U.S. Colored Heavy Artillery on April 26, 1864)
- 3rd Regiment Heavy Artillery U.S. Colored Troops
- 4th Regiment Heavy Artillery U.S. Colored Troops (originally designated 2nd Tennessee Colored Heavy Artillery Regiment)
- 5th Regiment Heavy Artillery U.S. Colored Troops (originally designated 9th Louisiana Infantry (African Descent) and 1st Mississippi Heavy Artillery (Colored))
- 6th Regiment Heavy Artillery U.S. Colored Troops (originally designated 1st Alabama Siege Artillery Regiment (Colored))
- 7th Regiment Heavy Artillery U.S. Colored Troops - redesignated as 10th Heavy Artillery
- 8th Regiment Heavy Artillery U.S. Colored Troops (originally designated 1st Kentucky Heavy Artillery Regiment, African Descent)
- 9th Regiment Heavy Artillery U.S. Colored Troops - failed to complete organization
- 10th Regiment Heavy Artillery U.S. Colored Troops (originally designated 1st Louisiana Heavy Artillery Regiment, African Descent)
- 11th Regiment Heavy Artillery U.S. Colored Troops (originally designated 14th Rhode Island Heavy Artillery (Colored))
- 12th Regiment Heavy Artillery U.S. Colored Troops
- 13th Regiment Heavy Artillery U.S. Colored Troops
- 14th Regiment Heavy Artillery U.S. Colored Troops
- Independent Battery, United States Colored Light Artillery

== See also ==
- List of American Civil War regiments by state
- United States Colored Troops
