= 128th United States Colored Infantry Regiment =

- Flag of the United States (1865–1867)
- Active: April 23-29 1865 - October 20, 1866
- Country: United States
- Allegiance: Union Army
- Branch: Infantry
- Engagements: None

Commanders
- Notable commanders: Colonel Charles H. Howard.

The 128th United States Colored Infantry Regiment was an infantry regiment that served with the USCT during the American Civil War.

== Service ==
The regiment was organized at Hilton Head, South Carolina, in April 23-29 1865, for three years' service. It was commanded by Colonel Charles H. Howard.

The regiment conducted duty in the Department of the South until October 1865.

The regiment was mustered out of service on October 20, 1866.

== Notable commanders ==
- Colonel Charles H. Howard

== See also ==
- List of United States Colored Troops units in the American Civil War
