= 42nd United States Colored Infantry Regiment =

42nd United States Colored Infantry
- Active: April 20, 1864 - January 31, 1866
- Country: United States
- Allegiance: Union
- Branch: Infantry

The 42nd United States Colored Infantry was an infantry regiment that served in the Union Army during the American Civil War. The regiment was composed of African American enlisted men commanded by white officers and was authorized by the Bureau of Colored Troops which was created by the United States War Department on May 22, 1863.

== Service ==
The 42nd U.S. Colored Infantry was organized in Chattanooga and Nashville, Tennessee beginning April 20, 1864 for three-year service under the command of Colonel Joseph R. Putnam.

The regiment was attached to District of Chattanooga, Department of the Cumberland, to November 1864. Unattached, District of the Etowah, Department of the Cumberland, to December 1864. 1st Colored Brigade, District of the Etowah, to January 1865. Unattached, District of the Etowah, to March 1865. 1st Colored Brigade, Department of the Cumberland, to July 1865. 2nd Brigade, 4th Division, District of East Tennessee, July 1865. Department of Georgia to January 1866.

The regiment served guard and garrison duty at Chattanooga, Tennessee during its entire term of service.

The 42nd U.S. Colored Infantry mustered out of service January 31, 1866.

== Commanders ==
- Colonel Joseph R. Putnam

== Notable members ==
- 2nd Lieutenant William Christie Johnson, Company A - 28th Commander-in-Chief (1899) of the Grand Army of the Republic

== See also ==
- List of United States Colored Troops Civil War units
- United States Colored Troops
