= 137th United States Colored Infantry Regiment =

- Flag of the United States (1865-1867)
- Active: April 8, 1865-January 15, 1866
- Country: United States
- Allegiance: Union
- Branch: Infantry
- Engagements: None

The 137th United States Colored Infantry Regiment, was an infantry regiment that served in the USCT during the American Civil War.

== Service ==
The regiment was mustered into service at Macon, Georgia, on June 1, 1865. The regiment performed duty in the Department of Georgia until January 1866.

The regiment was mustered out of service on January 15, 1866.

== Commanders ==
- Colonel Martin R. Archer
- Lieutenant Colonel William G. Young.
- Major Cyrus L. Connor

== See also ==
- List of United States Colored Troops units in the American Civil War
