= 15th United States Colored Infantry Regiment =

15th United States Colored Infantry
- Active: December 2, 1863 - April 7, 1866
- Country: United States
- Allegiance: Union
- Branch: Infantry

The 15th United States Colored Infantry was an infantry regiment that served in the Union Army during the American Civil War. The regiment was composed of African American enlisted men commanded by white officers and was authorized by the Bureau of Colored Troops which was created by the United States War Department on May 22, 1863.

== Service ==
The 15th U.S. Colored Infantry was organized in Nashville, Tennessee beginning December 2, 1863 and mustered in for three-year service. The regiment was attached to Post and District of Nashville, Department of the Cumberland, to August 1864. Post of Springfield, District of Nashville, Department of the Cumberland, to March 1865. 5th Sub-District, District of Middle Tennessee, Department of the Cumberland, to April 1866. Garrison and guard duty at Nashville, Columbia, and Pulaski, Tennessee, until June 1864. Post duty at Springfield, Tennessee, and in District of Middle Tennessee until April 1866.The 15th U.S. Colored Infantry mustered out of service April 7, 1866.

== See also ==
- List of United States Colored Troops Civil War Units
- United States Colored Troops
