= William Hines Furbush =

American politician (c.1839–1902)

Arkansas House of Representatives
- In office 1878–?

Personal details
- Born: c. 1839 Carroll County, Kentucky, US
- Died: September 3, 1902 (aged 62–63) Marion, Indiana, US
- Resting place: Marion National Cemetery
- Party: Republican Party (before 1878)
- Other political affiliations: Democratic Party (past 1878)
- Spouse(s): Susan F. Dickey; Emma S. Owens
- Children: 4

Military service
- Allegiance: United States
- Branch/service: Union Army
- Years of service: February 1865–January 1866
- Rank: Commissary Sergeant
- Unit: 42nd Ohio Infantry Regiment
- Battles/wars: American Civil War

William Hines Furbush (c. 1839 – September 3, 1902) was an American photographer, politician, police officer, lawyer and newspaper editor. In February 1865, towards the end of the American Civil War, he joined the 42nd United States Colored Infantry Regiment in Columbus, Ohio. He became a commissary sergeant and was discharged in January 1866. He lived in Liberia for a short time after the war and returned to the United States.

Furbush was born in Carroll County, Kentucky. He studied in Ohio. He worked as a photographer in Delaware.

A Republican, he served in the Arkansas Legislature. He advocated for the creation of Lee County, Arkansas (named for Confederate Army leader Robert E. Lee) and was appointed its first sheriff. He eventually switched to the Democratic Party. He moved to Colorado and Ohio before returning to Arkansas.

Furbush was involved in Civil Rights disputes over he and other African-Americans being denied admission to restaurants and theaters. Mifflin Wistar Gibbs helped win one of the legal cases. He also founded one of the first Democratic newspapers aimed at Black readers in Arkansas, attempting to influence Fusion politics before the party's later disenfranchisement of African Americans.

In 1874, he married 18-year-old schoolteacher Emma S. Owens in Memphis, Tennessee.

Furbush's later career was tumultuous. He resigned as sheriff for a white man and ran as a Democrat for a seat in the Arkansas House of Representatives. He was likely the first African-American Democrat in the Arkansas House. He feuded with the Lily White Republicans and Democrats, whom he came to support, even establishing a Democratic Party paper for blacks, before the party disenfranchised his fellow African-Americans and drew Fusion politics to a close. He spent time in Colorado, where he was accused of killing a man and was nearly lynched before being cleared of charges. He returned to Arkansas. His wife and a daughter had died of yellow fever in the meantime. He later moved to South Carolina and Georgia.

In 2021, a bust honoring him was installed in Marianna, Arkansas's Downtown Court Square.

== See also ==
- African American officeholders from the end of the Civil War until before 1900
