= X Corps (Union army) =

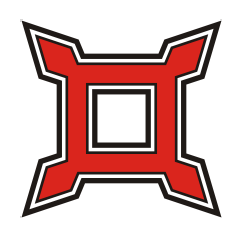
- X Corps badge
- Active: 1862–1865
- Country: United States of America
- Branch: Union Army
- Type: Army Corps
- Role: Headquarters
- Size: Corps
- Part of: Department of the South; Army of the James
- Engagements: American Civil War: Bermuda Hundred Campaign; Drewry's Bluff; Battle of Fort Wagner; Battle of Olustee; Overland Campaign; Battle of Cold Harbor; Petersburg Campaign

Commanders
- Notable commanders: Quincy Adams Gillmore

Insignia
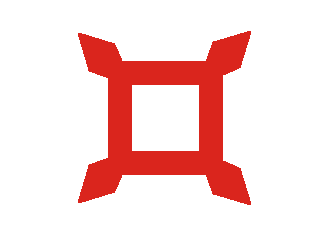
- 1st Division

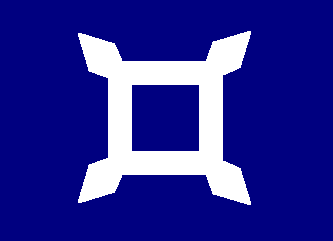
- 2nd Division

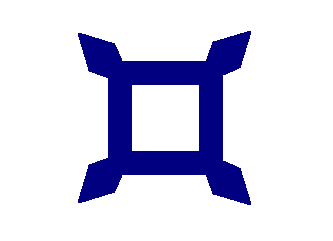
- 3rd Division

X Corps was a corps of the Union Army during the American Civil War. It served during operations in South Carolina in the Department of the South, and later in Benjamin Butler's Army of the James, during the Bermuda Hundred and Petersburg Campaigns.

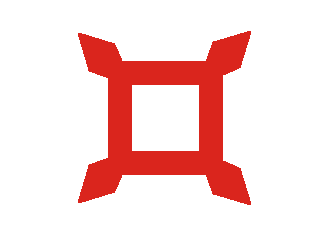
Union Army 1st Division Badge, X Corps

== History ==
The corps was officially created on September 13, 1862, to consist of the majority of Union troops operating in South Carolina and eastern Georgia. (Other troops in Florida were officially under its command but were not effectively.) The corps was initially commanded by Ormsby M. Mitchel, who announced via General Orders issued from his headquarters at Hilton Head, South Carolina on September 17, 1862 that he had assumed command of the U.S. Army's Department of the South "in obedience to orders from the Adjutant-General's Office."

When Mitchel died from yellow fever on October 30, 1862, he was succeeded by John Milton Brannan. Brannan was then later succeeded by David Hunter, Quincy Adams Gillmore, David B. Birney and Alfred H. Terry.

The corps took part in most of the operations against Charleston from 1862–63, including attacks on James Island and Morris Island and the Battle of Fort Wagner. Other elements of the corps based in Florida took part in the disastrous Battle of Olustee.

In early 1864, the corps, now commanded by Gillmore, was transferred to the Army of the James. It took part in the Bermuda Hundred operations and played a principal role in the disastrous Drewry's Bluff action. It also took part in the attack on Cold Harbor in conjunction with units of the Army of the Potomac, and the corps played a major role in the early stages of the Petersburg Campaign.

In December 1864, the corps was disbanded; its white contingent went to the new XXIV Corps, while its black units went to the XXV Corps. A detachment of former X Corps troops took part in the successful attack on Fort Fisher, North Carolina, in early 1865. The X Corps was "revived", under the command of Alfred Terry, in March 1865. It was attached to the Department of North Carolina under Schofield and was part of Sherman's Army after Bentonville. After Johnston's surrender, it served primarily on garrison duty in South Carolina and Georgia until it was discontinued in August 1865.
