= Army of the James =

Union Field Army during the American Civil War

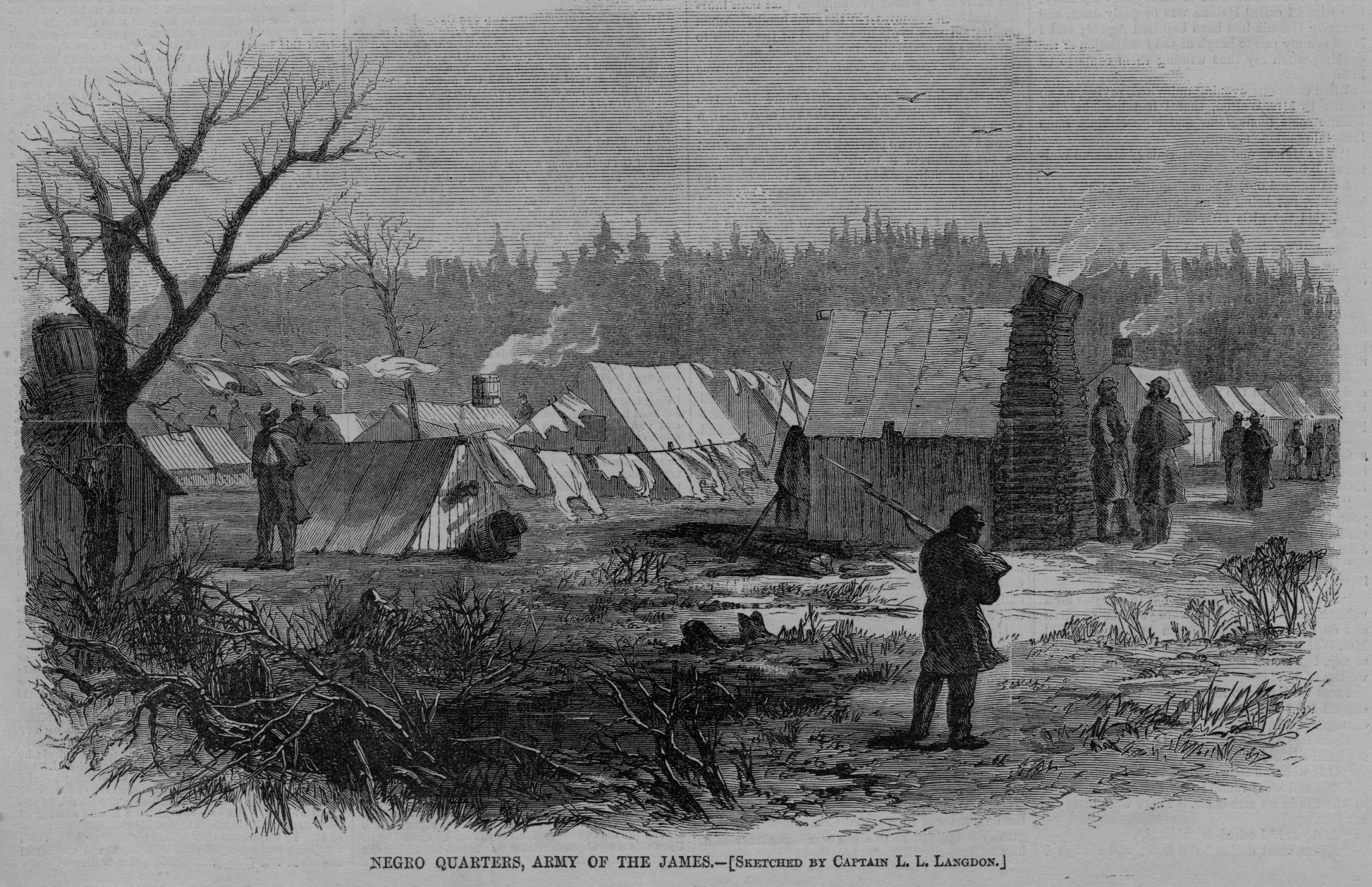
- The Negro quarters of the Army of the James
- Active: April 1864–August 1865
- Country: United States
- Branch: United States Army
- Type: Field army
- Engagements: American Civil War

Commanders
- Notable commanders: Benjamin F. Butler; Edward Ord

The Army of the James was a Union army that was composed of units from the Department of Virginia and North Carolina and served along the James River during the final operations of the American Civil War in Virginia.

== History ==
The Union Departments of Virginia and North Carolina merged in 1863. Troops from these departments formed the XVIII Corps. In April 1864 the X Corps was transferred from the Department of the South and the two corps formed the Army of the James. Maj. Gen. Benjamin F. Butler was placed in command.

During Lt. Gen. Ulysses Grant's Overland Campaign in 1864, Butler made several unsuccessful attempts at Petersburg and Richmond. At the Battle of Cold Harbor the XVIII Corps was sent to act under the Army of the Potomac. The XVIII Corps also participated in the Siege of Petersburg. During the siege, the Army of the James was mainly involved in the investment of Richmond.

Butler's only major success as commander of the army was in September 1864 at the Battle of Chaffin's Farm, in which the army took a significant portion of the Confederate works guarding Richmond, including Fort Harrison. In December the army was reorganized and the XVIII and X Corps were for the time discontinued. All the black troops in the army were formed into the XXV Corps and the white troops into the XXIV Corps and the Departments of Virginia and North Carolina were separated. Units from the former XVIII Corps and X Corps were formed into the "Fort Fisher Expeditionary Corps" and sailed to Fort Fisher. Butler used his position as department commander to assume personal command of the expedition, but after his failure at the First Battle of Fort Fisher, Grant took the opportunity to relieve Butler of command. Maj. Gen. Edward Ord was placed in command of the Army of the James.

Under Ord's leadership the Army of the James was to achieve its greatest success. The XXIV Corps participated in the final assaults on Petersburg, while the XXV Corps was the first unit to enter the fallen city of Richmond. Ord and the XXIV Corps followed the Confederates to Appomattox Court House where they cut off Robert E. Lee's escape route. The Army of the James was present at the surrender of the Army of Northern Virginia.

== Command history ==
- Major General Benjamin F. Butler (April 28, 1864 – January 8, 1865)
- Major General Edward Ord (January 8, 1865 – August 1, 1865)

== Major battles and campaigns ==
- Bermuda Hundred Campaign
- Battle of Cold Harbor (only the XVIII Corps was involved from the Army of the James)
- Siege of Petersburg
- Siege of Richmond
- Battle of Chaffin's Farm
- First Battle of Fort Fisher
- Second Battle of Fort Fisher
- Battle of Wilmington
- Fall of Petersburg
- Fall of Richmond (only the XXV Corps was involved from the Army of the James)
- Appomattox Campaign
