= Department of Virginia and North Carolina =

United States military department during the Civil War

The Department of Virginia and North Carolina was a United States Military department encompassing Union-occupied territory in the Confederate States during the Civil War. In 1863, it was formed by the merging of two previously existing departments: the Department of Virginia and the Department of North Carolina. In 1865, the two departments were once again separated.

== Department of Virginia ==
=== 1861 ===
The Department of Virginia was created on May 22, 1861, to include any areas within a 60-mile radius of Fort Monroe and any sections of North Carolina and South Carolina occupied by the Union Army. Major General Benjamin F. Butler was appointed its first commander. Early battles undertaken by troops from this department under General Butler included actions at Big Bethel and Hatteras Inlent. Early on the department was also known as the Department of Southeastern Virginia.

On January 7, 1862, the areas of North Carolina were detached to form the Department of North Carolina. On June 1, 1862, the area south of the Rappahannock River and east of the Fredericksburg-Richmond-Petersburg-Weldon Railroad were added to the department. From June 26, 1862, to September 12, 1862, John Pope's Army of Virginia operated within the department. On July 15, 1863, the Dept. of Virginia was merged with the Dept. of North Carolina.

=== 1865 ===
On January 18, 1865, the Department of Virginia was re-created to consist of the area within 60 miles of Fort Monroe, the areas south of the Rappahannock River and east of the Fredericksburg-Richmond-Petersburg-Weldon Railroad. On April 19, 1865, much of the rest of Virginia was added, excluding the Shenandoah Valley. From January 18, 1865, to August 1, 1865, the Army of the James consisted of troops from this department which were the first to enter the fallen capital city of Richmond.

=== Commanders ===
1861
Benjamin F. Butler (May 22, 1861 – August 9, 1861)
John E. Wool (August 9, 1861 – June 2, 1862)
George B. McClellan (appointed June 1, 1862 – never assumed command)
John Adams Dix (June 2, 1862 – April 6, 1863)
Erasmus D. Keyes (April 6, 1863 – April 14, 1863)
John Adams Dix (April 14, 1863 – July 15, 1863)
1865
E.O.C. Ord (January 18, 1865 – June 14, 1865)
Henry W. Halleck (appointed April 16, 1865, but revoked April 19, 1865)
Alfred H. Terry (June 14, 1865 – August 6, 1866)

=== Posts in the Department of Virginia ===
- Fort Monroe, VA, 1861–65, Norfolk
- Fort Calhoun, Virginia, 1861–62, renamed Fort Wool, Virginia, 1862–65, Norfolk
- Fort Norfolk, VA, 1862–65, Norfolk
- Norfolk Military Prison, VA, 1862–63, Norfolk
- Camp Naglee, 1862–1864, Norfolk
- Post at Newport News, VA, 1863–65 Newport News
- Civil War Defenses of Williamsburg, 1862–1865, Williamsburg
- Burwell's Landing Batteries, 1862, Kingsmill-on-the-James
- Defenses of Jamestown Island, 1862, 1863–1865, Jamestown, Virginia
- Swann's Point Battery, 1862, 1863–1865, north of Surry, Virginia

== Department of North Carolina ==
=== 1862 ===
The Department of North Carolina was created on January 7, 1862, to include the areas of North Carolina occupied by Union forces. These areas were formerly part of the Department of Virginia. Brigadier General Ambrose E. Burnside was the department's first commander. Early territories captured by Burnside's Expeditionary Force included Roanoke Island, New Bern, Morehead City, Beaufort and Fort Macon. On December 24, 1862, XVIII Corps was created, composed of the five divisions stationed in North Carolina. On July 15, 1863, the department was merged with the Department of Virginia. The Department of North Carolina was headquartered at the Slover-Bradham House in New Bern, North Carolina.

=== 1865 ===
On January 31, 1865, the department was re-created to include Union-occupied areas of North Carolina excluding those occupied by the armies of William T. Sherman. General John M. Schofield was hand picked by Ulysses Grant to head the department. Schofield assembled troops within the department into the Wilmington Expeditionary Force which he personally led in the capture of Wilmington. Significant territories included in the department were those captured by Ambrose Burnside in 1862 along with recently captured Fort Fisher and Wilmington. In March 1865, the troops of the Department of North Carolina formed the "revived" X Corps, under the command of Alfred Terry. On May 19, 1866, it was merged into the Department of the Carolinas.

=== Commanders ===
1862
Ambrose Burnside (January 7, 1862 – July 6, 1862)
John G. Foster (July 6, 1862 – March 29, 1863)
Innis N. Palmer (March 29, 1863 – April 16, 1863)
John G. Foster (April 16 – July 15, 1863)
1865
John M. Schofield (January 31, 1865 – June 20, 1865)
Jacob D. Cox (June 20, 1865 – June 28, 1865)
Thomas H. Ruger (June 28, 1865 – May 19, 1866)

=== Posts in Department of North Carolina ===
- Fort Ocracoke, 1861–1865), Beacon Island
- Fort Clark, 1861–1865, Hatteras Inlet
- Camp Wool, 1862–1865, just west of Fort Clark
- Fort Hatteras, 1861–1865, Hatteras Inlet
- Bogue Sound Blockhouse, 1862–1864, Morehead Township
- Fort Macon, 1862–1865, Atlantic Beach
- Newport Barracks, 1862–1864, Newport
- Fort Lane, 1862, James City
- Defenses of New Bern, NC, (1862–1865), New Bern
- Camp Hoffman, 1862–1865, near Tuscarora
- Defenses of Washington, NC, (1862–1865), Washington

== Department of Virginia & North Carolina ==
The Department of Virginia & North Carolina was created on July 15, 1863, composed of all the territories formerly part of the Department of Virginia and Department of North Carolina. From December 21, 1863, to June 27, 1864, St. Mary's County, Maryland was also part of the department. On January 18, 1865, the department was again separated into the Dept. of Virginia and Dept. of North Carolina.

From August 12, 1863, to April 25, 1864, the Army of North Carolina consisted of troops from the District of North Carolina within the Department of Virginia & North Carolina. The Army and District of North Carolina were commanded by John J. Peck.

From April 28, 1864, to January 18, 1865, the Army of the James was composed of troops within the Dept. of Virginia & North Carolina. It primarily served in Virginia during the Bermuda Hundred Campaign and during the siege of Petersburg conducting operations against the city of Richmond north of the James River.

=== Commanders ===
George W. Getty (July 15, 1863 – July 18, 1863)
John G. Foster (July 18, 1863 – August 28, 1863)
Benjamin F. Butler (August 28, 1863 – August 27, 1864)
E.O.C. Ord (August 27, 1864 – September 5, 1864)
David B. Birney (September 5, 1864 – September 7, 1864)
Benjamin F. Butler (September 7, 1864 – December 14, 1864)
E.O.C. Ord (December 14, 1864 – December 24, 1864)
Benjamin F. Butler (December 24, 1864 – January 7, 1865)
E.O.C. Ord (January 7, 1865 – January 18, 1865)

== See also ==
- Army of Virginia
- Army of the James
