= XXV Corps (Union army) =

American Civil War Army Corps

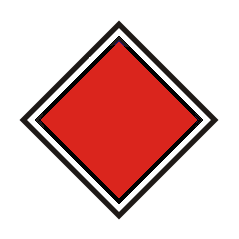
- XXV Corps badge
- Active: 1864–1866
- Country: United States of America
- Branch: Union Army
- Type: Army Corps
- Size: Corps
- Part of: Army of the James
- Engagements: American Civil War

Commanders
- Notable commanders: MG Godfrey Weitzel

XXV Corps was a corps of the Union Army during the American Civil War. It was unique in that it was made up almost entirely of African-American troops. These soldiers had previously belonged to the X Corps and XVIII Corps. As the XXV, they captured Richmond, Virginia, the capital of the Confederacy, in 1865 and also stopped general Robert E. Lee's army at Appomattox Court House —where the Confederates officially surrendered a week later.

== History ==
On December 3, 1864, the two corps of the Army of the James were reorganized. Its white units went to the XXIV Corps, while the black units became the XXV Corps, under the command of Major General Godfrey Weitzel. The new XXV Corps served with distinction during the waning days of the Petersburg Campaign. Its main noteworthy action was being the first command to occupy Richmond on April 3, 1865. In May the corps was sent to Texas to serve as the "Army of Occupation" against Napoleon III's French presence in Mexico. The XXV Corps was disbanded in January 1866.

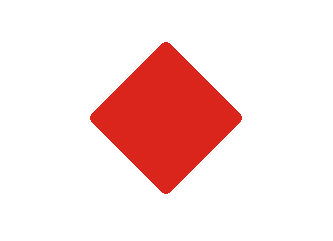
Union Army 1st Division Badge, XXV Corps

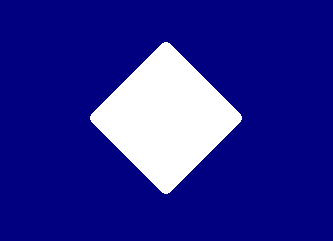
Union Army 2nd Division Badge, XXV Corps

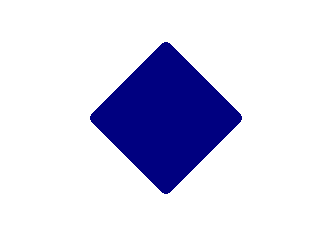
Union Army 3rd Division Badge, XXV Corps
