= Atlanta campaign =

1864 military campaign of the American Civil War

Atlanta Campaign
- Part of the American Civil War
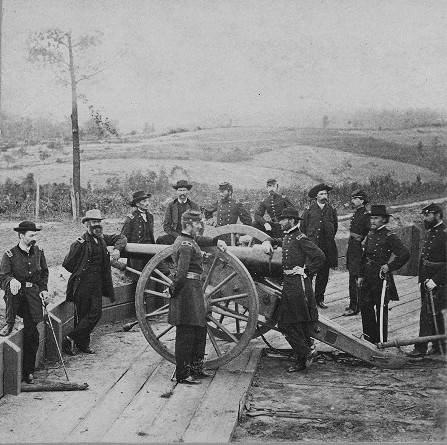
- Union Major-General William Sherman and his staff on July 18, 1864, on the lines before Atlanta, Georgia.
Date	May 7 – September 2, 1864 (3 months, 3 weeks and 5 days)
Location	Northwestern Georgia and around Atlanta 33°44′56″N 84°23′17″W
Result	Union victory

Belligerents
United States	Confederate States

Commanders and leaders
(United States) William T. Sherman: George H. Thomas; John Schofield; Oliver O. Howard; John A. Logan; Joseph Hooker; Judson Kilpatrick; Thomas J. Wood; Richard W. Johnson; John M. Palmer; James B. Steedman; Bernard Laiboldt; James B. McPherson †	(Confederate States of America) Joseph E. Johnston (Confederate States of America) John B. Hood: William J. Hardee; Stephen D. Lee; Joseph Wheeler; Gustavus W. Smith; William B. Bate; Frank C. Armstrong; William H. Jackson; Patrick Cleburne; John H. Kelly; William Y. C. Humes; Alexander P. Stewart (WIA); Leonidas Polk †

Units involved
Union order of battle (1st phase); Union order of battle (2nd phase)	Confederate order of battle (1st phase); Confederate order of battle (2nd phase)

Strength
112,819	Beginning – 60,000 Infantry, 11,000 cavalry, 7,000 Artillery

Casualties and losses
31,687; (4,423 killed, 22,822 wounded, 4,442 missing/captured)	34,979; (3,044 killed, 18,952 wounded, 12,983 missing/captured)

The Atlanta campaign was a series of battles fought in the western theater of the American Civil War throughout northwest Georgia and the area around Atlanta during the summer of 1864. Union Major General William T. Sherman invaded Georgia from the vicinity of Chattanooga, Tennessee, beginning in May 1864, opposed by the Confederate general Joseph E. Johnston.

Johnston's Army of Tennessee withdrew toward Atlanta in the face of successive flanking maneuvers by Sherman's group of armies. In July, the Confederate president, Jefferson Davis, replaced Johnston with the more aggressive General John B. Hood, who began challenging the Union Army in a series of costly frontal assaults. Hood's army was eventually besieged in Atlanta and the city fell on September 2, setting the stage for Sherman's March to the Sea and hastening the end of the war.

== Background ==
=== Military situation ===
The Atlanta campaign followed the Union victory in the Battles for Chattanooga in November 1863; Chattanooga was known as the "Gateway to the South", and its capture opened that gateway. After Ulysses S. Grant was promoted to general-in-chief of all Union armies, he left his favorite subordinate from his time in command of the Western Theater, William T. Sherman, in charge of the Western armies. Grant's strategy was to apply pressure against the Confederacy in several coordinated offensives. While he, George G. Meade, Benjamin Butler, Franz Sigel, George Crook, and William W. Averell advanced in Virginia against Robert E. Lee, and Nathaniel Banks attempted to capture Mobile, Alabama, Sherman was assigned the mission of defeating Johnston's army, capturing Atlanta, and striking through Georgia and the Confederate heartland.

== Opposing forces ==
=== Union ===
Principal Union commanders
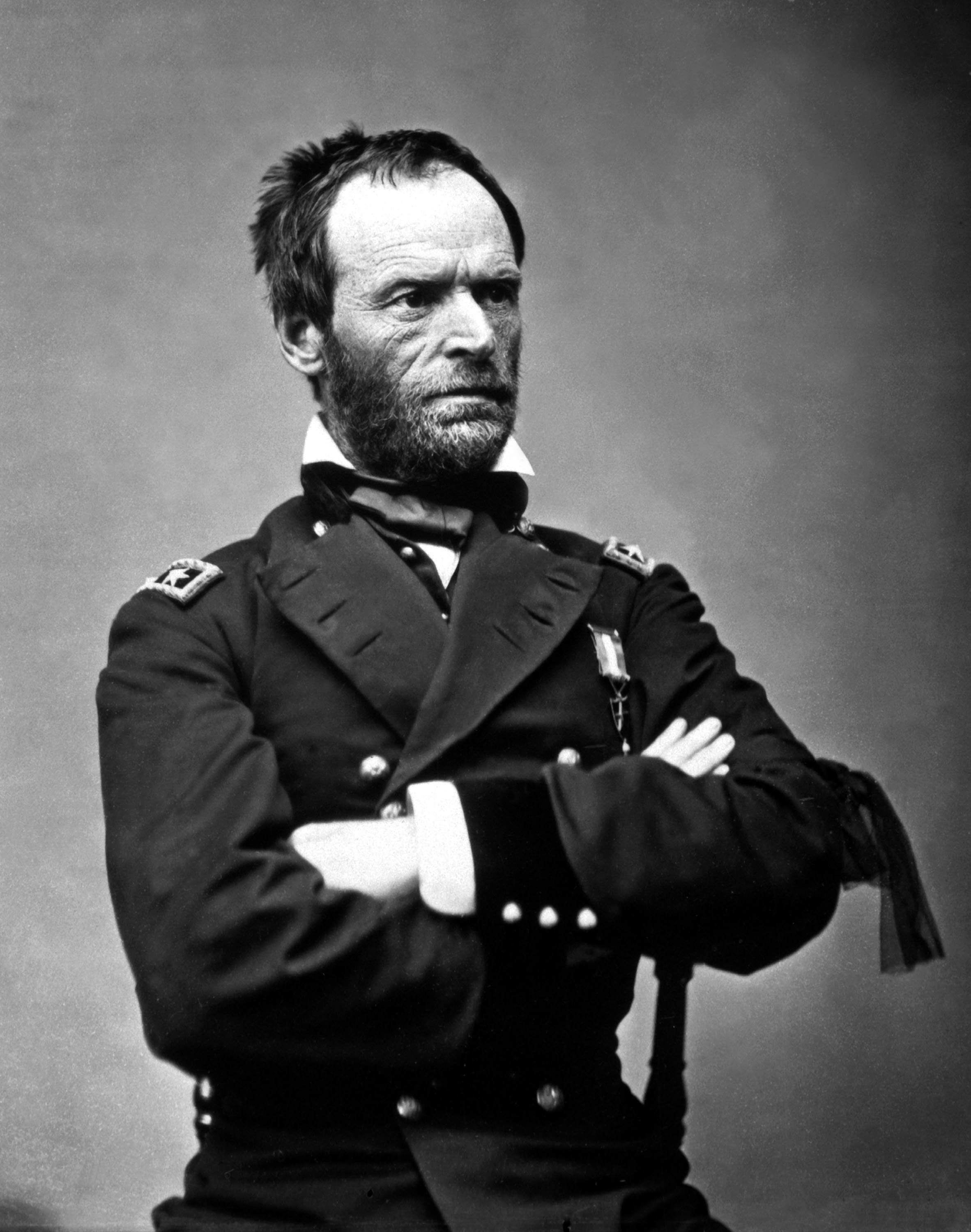
Maj. Gen.
William T. Sherman

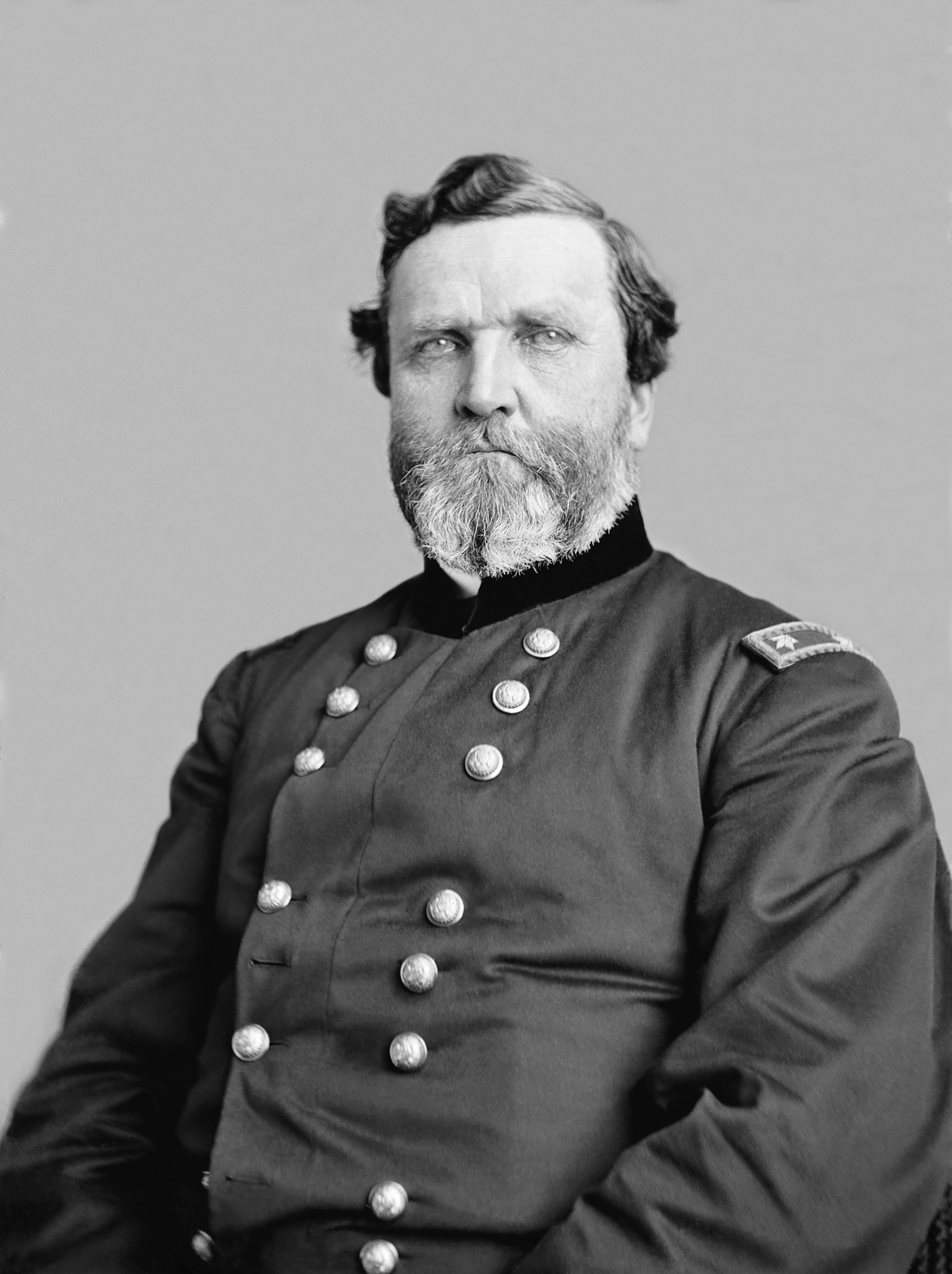
Maj. Gen.
George H. Thomas

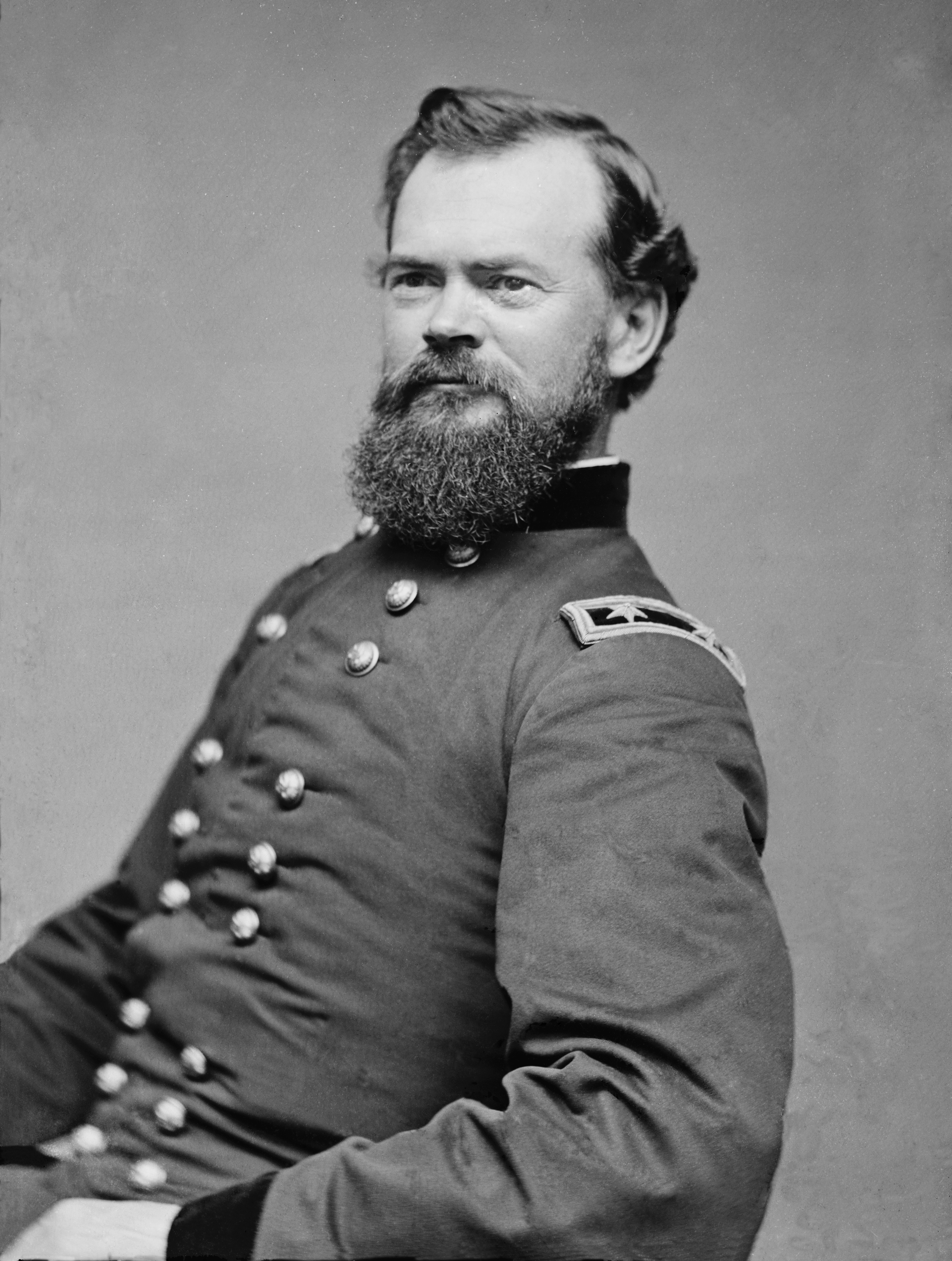
Maj. Gen.
James B. McPherson

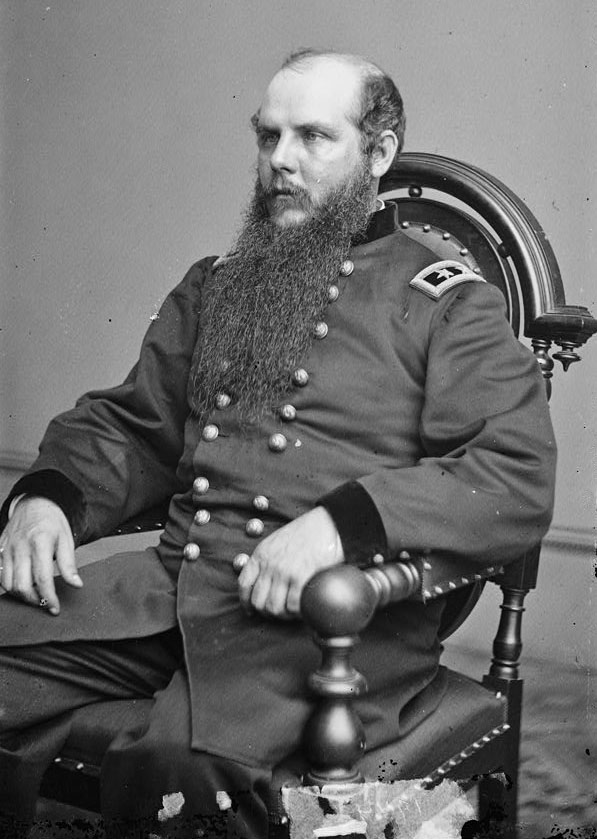
Maj. Gen.
John M. Schofield

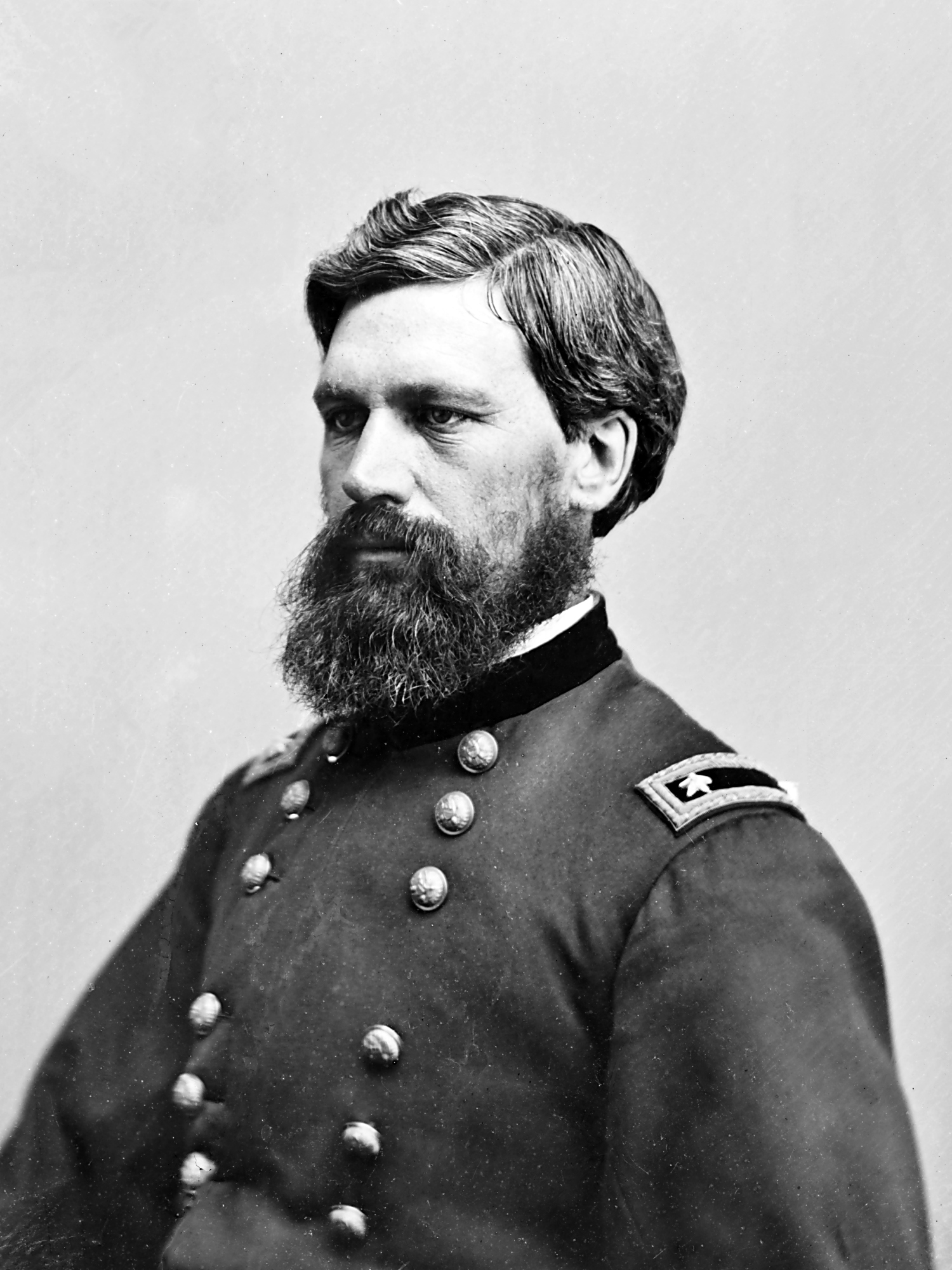
Maj. Gen.
Oliver O. Howard

At the start of the campaign, Sherman's Military Division of the Mississippi consisted of three armies:

- Maj. Gen. James B. McPherson's Army of the Tennessee (Sherman's army under Grant in 1863), including the corps of Maj. Gen. John A. Logan (XV Corps), Maj. Gen. Grenville M. Dodge (XVI Corps), and Maj. Gen. Francis P. Blair Jr. (XVII Corps). When McPherson was killed at the Battle of Atlanta, Maj. Gen. Oliver O. Howard replaced him.
- Maj. Gen. John M. Schofield's Army of the Ohio, consisting of Schofield's XXIII Corps and a cavalry division commanded by Maj. Gen. George Stoneman.
- Maj. Gen. George H. Thomas's Army of the Cumberland, including the corps of Maj. Gen. Oliver O. Howard (IV Corps), Maj. Gen. John M. Palmer (XIV Corps), Maj. Gen. Joseph Hooker (XX Corps), and Brig. Gen. Washington L. Elliott (Cavalry Corps). After Howard took army command, David S. Stanley took over IV Corps.

On paper at the beginning of the campaign, Sherman outnumbered Johnston 98,500 to 50,000, but his ranks were initially depleted by many furloughed soldiers, and Johnston received 15,000 reinforcements from Alabama. However, by June, a steady stream of reinforcements brought Sherman's strength to 112,000.

=== Confederate ===
Principal Confederate commanders
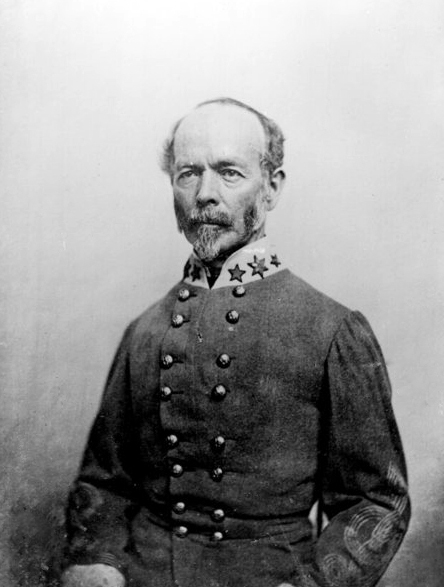
Gen.
Joseph E. Johnston

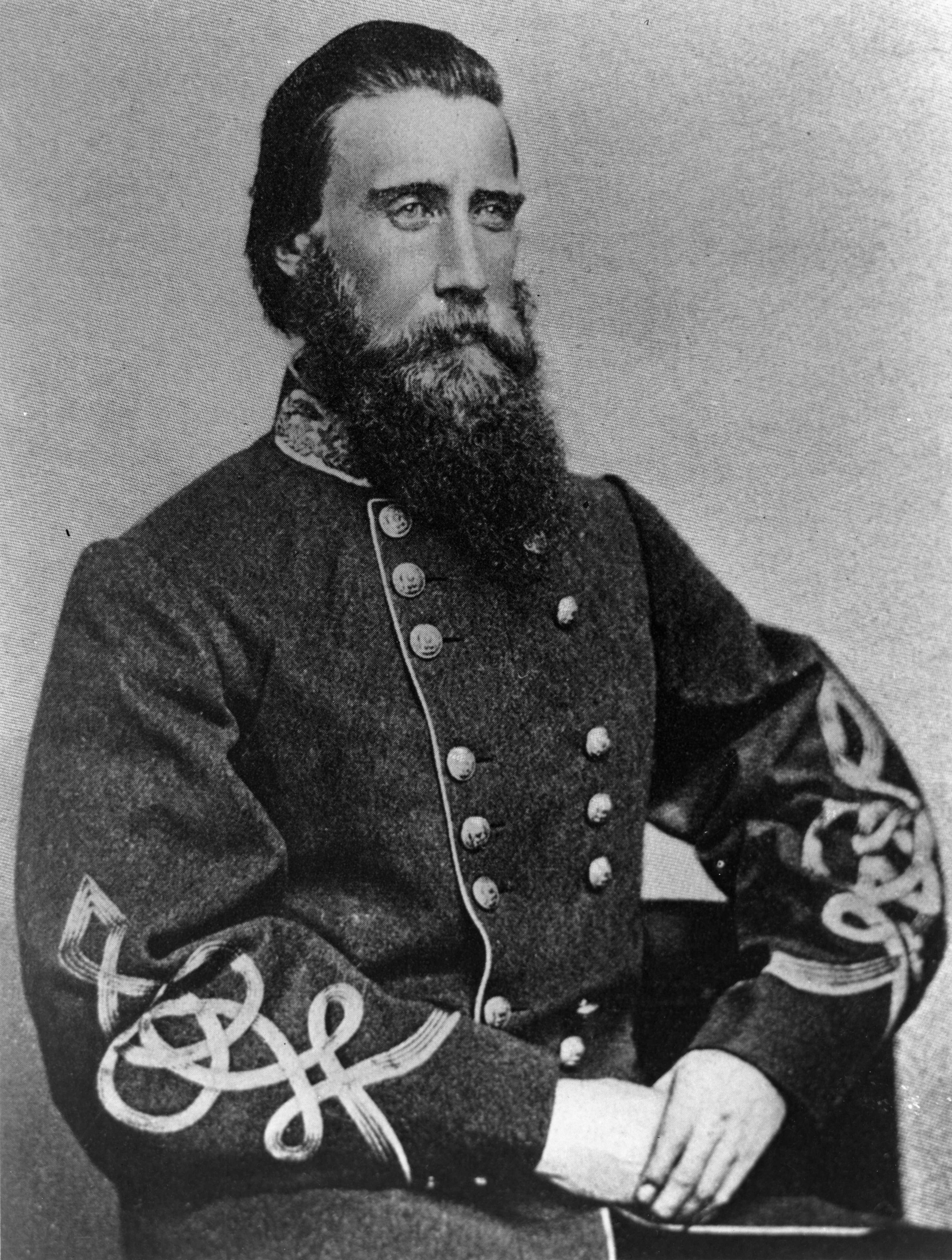
Lt. Gen.
John B. Hood

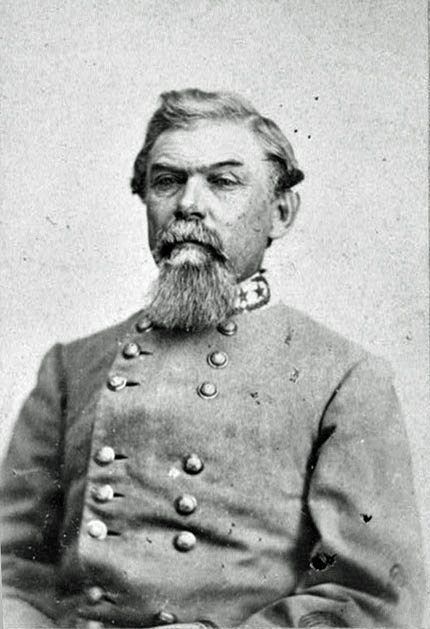
Lt. Gen.
William J. Hardee

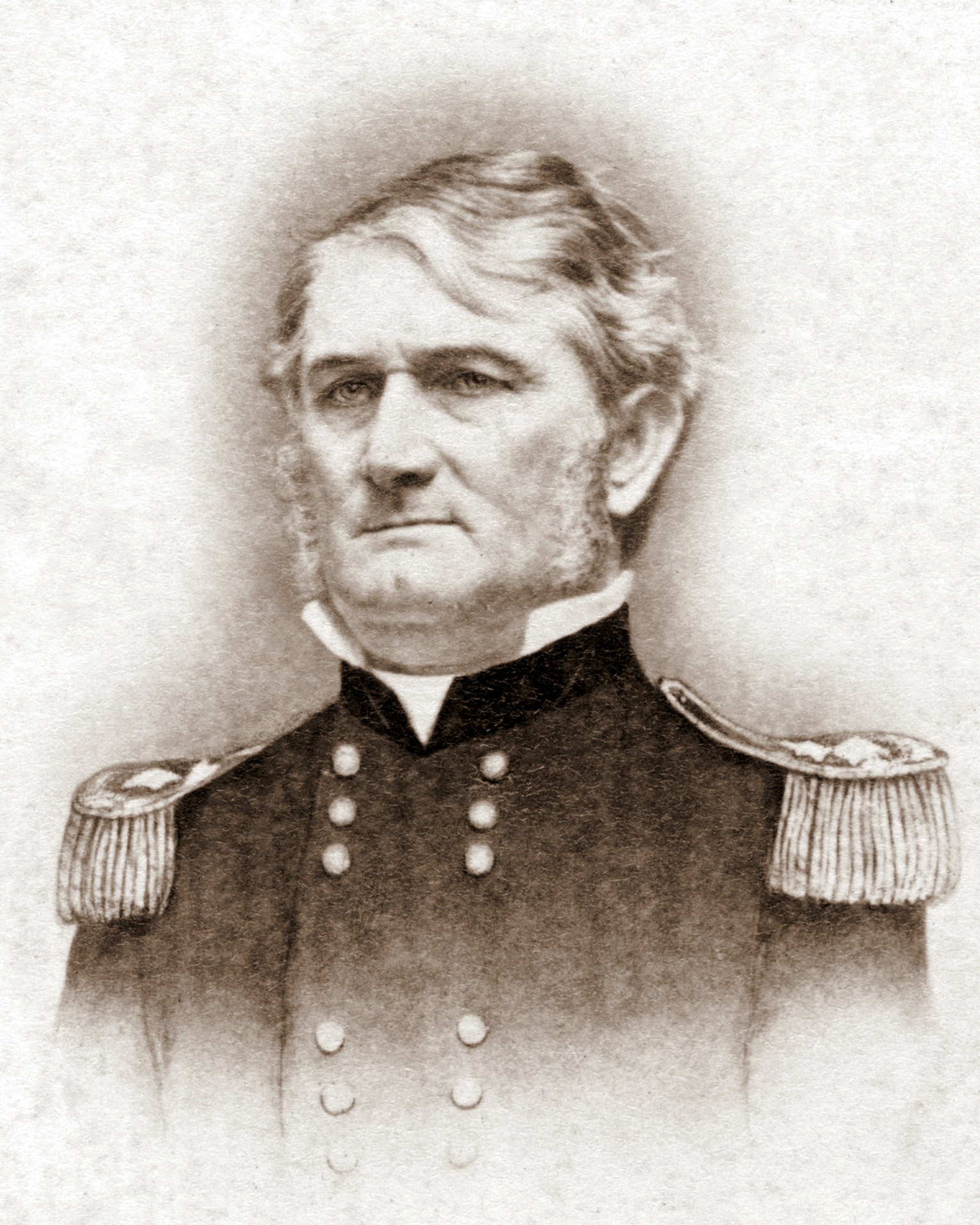
Lt. Gen.
Leonidas Polk

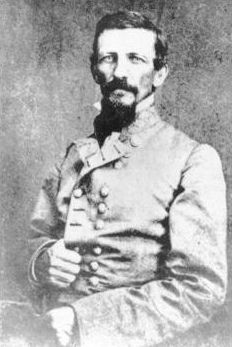
Lt. Gen.
Alexander P. Stewart

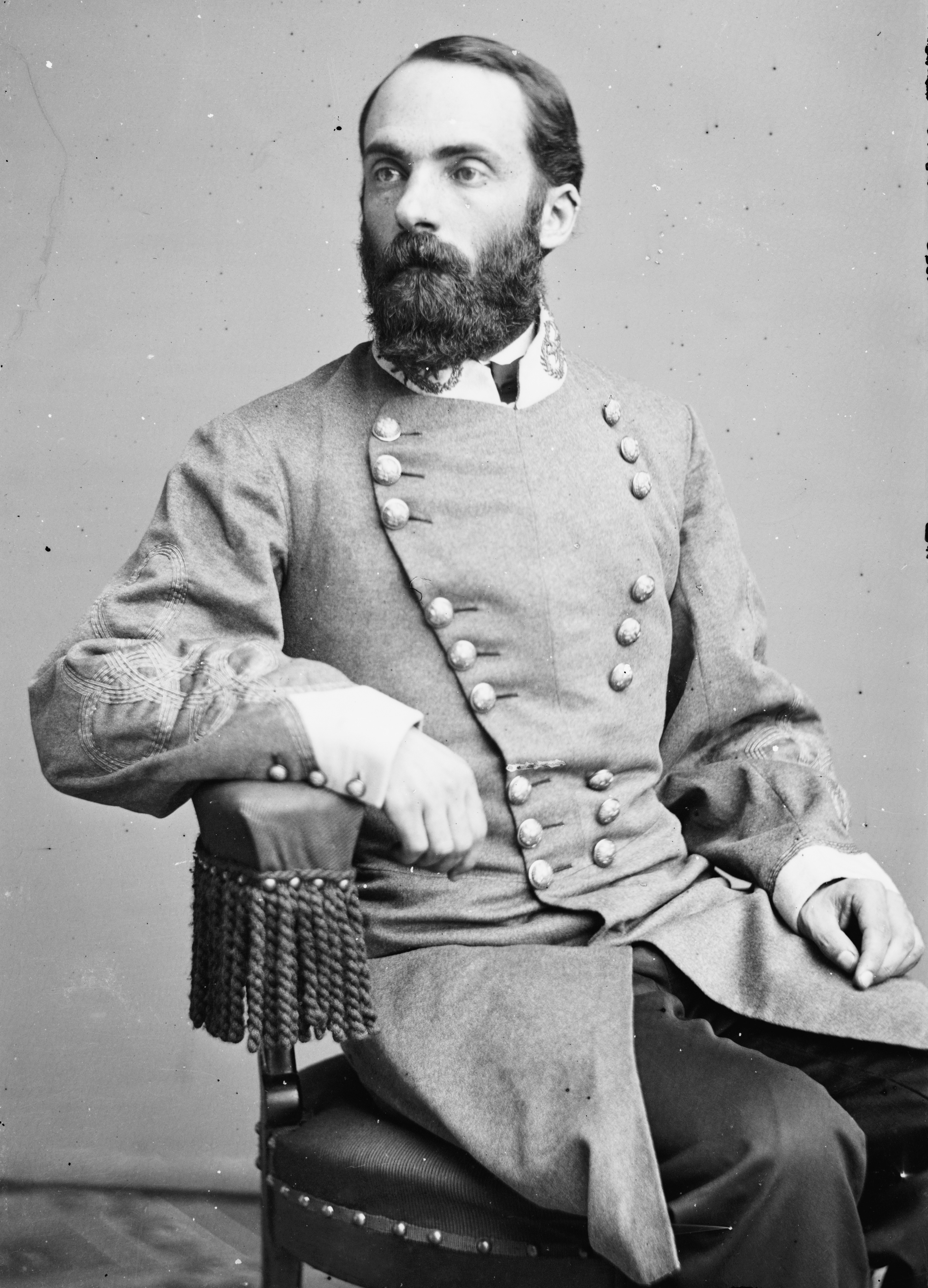
Maj. Gen.
Joseph Wheeler

Opposing Sherman, the Army of Tennessee was commanded first by Gen. Joseph E. Johnston, who was relieved of his command in mid-campaign and replaced by Lt. Gen. John B. Hood. The four corps in the 50,000-man army were commanded by:

- Lt. Gen. William J. Hardee (divisions of Maj. Gens. Benjamin F. Cheatham, Patrick R. Cleburne, William H. T. Walker, and William B. Bate).
- Lt. Gen. John B. Hood (divisions of Maj. Gens. Thomas C. Hindman, Carter L. Stevenson, and Alexander P. Stewart).
- Lt. Gen. Leonidas Polk (also called the Army of Mississippi, with the infantry divisions of Maj. Gen. William W. Loring, Samuel G. French, and Edward C. Walthall, and a cavalry division under Brig. Gen. William Hicks Jackson). When Polk was killed on June 14, Loring briefly took over as commander of the corps but was then replaced by Alexander P. Stewart on June 23.
- Maj. Gen. Joseph Wheeler (Cavalry corps, with the divisions of Maj. Gen. William T. Martin and Brig. Gens. John H. Kelly and William Y. C. Humes).

Johnston was a conservative general with a reputation for withdrawing his army before serious contact would result; this was certainly his pattern against George B. McClellan in the Peninsula Campaign of 1862. But in Georgia, he faced the much more aggressive Sherman. Johnston's army repeatedly took up strongly entrenched defensive positions in the campaign. Sherman prudently avoided suicidal frontal assaults against most of these positions, instead maneuvering in flanking marches around the defenses as he advanced from Chattanooga towards Atlanta. Whenever Sherman flanked the defensive lines (almost exclusively around Johnston's left flank), Johnston would retreat to another prepared position. Both armies took advantage of the railroads as supply lines, with Johnston shortening his supply lines as he drew closer to Atlanta, and Sherman lengthening his own.

== Summary ==
May 1 – September 8, 1864.
Date	Event
May 1, 1864	Skirmish at Stone Church.
May 2, 1864	Skirmish at Lee's Cross-Roads, near Tunnel Hill.
May 2, 1864	Skirmish near Ringgold Gap.
May 10, 1864	Skirmish at Catoosa Springs.
May 10, 1864	Skirmish at Red Clay.
May 10, 1864	Skirmish at Chickamauga Creek.
May 4, 1864	Maj. Gen. Frank P. Blair Jr., assumes command of the Seventeenth Army Corps.
May 4, 1864	Skirmish on the Varnell's Station Road.
May 5, 1864	Skirmish near Tunnel Hill.
May 6–7, 1864	Skirmishes at Tunnel Hill.
May 7, 1864	Skirmish at Varnell's Station.
May 7, 1864	Skirmish near Nickajack Gap.
May 8–11, 1864	Demonstration against Rocky Face Ridge, with combats at Buzzard Roost or Mill Creek Gap, and Dug Gap.
May 8–13, 1864	Demonstration against Resaca, with combats at Snake Creek Gap, Sugar Valley, and near Resaca.
May 9–13, 1864	Demonstration against Dalton, with combats near Varnell's Station (9th and 12th) and at Dalton (13th).
May 13, 1864	Skirmish at Tilton.
May 14–15, 1864	Battle of Resaca.
May 15, 1864	Skirmish at Armuchee Creek.
May 15, 1864	Skirmish near Rome.
May 16, 1864	Skirmish near Calhoun.
May 16, 1864	Action at Rome (or Parker's) Cross-Roads.
May 16, 1864	Skirmish at Floyd's Spring.
May 17, 1864	Engagement at Adairsville.
May 17, 1864	Action at Rome.
May 17, 1864	Affair at Madison Station, Ala.
May 18, 1864	Skirmish at Pine Log Creek.
May 18–19, 1864	Combats near Kingston.
May 18–19, 1864	Combats near Cassville.
May 20, 1864	Skirmish at Etowah River, near Cartersville.
May 23, 1864	Action at Stilesborough.
May 24, 1864	Skirmishes at Cass Station and Cassville. Skirmish at Burnt Hickory (or Huntsville).
May 24, 1864	Skirmish near Dallas.
May 25 – June 5, 1864	Operations on the line of Pumpkin Vine Creek, with combats at New Hope Church, Pickett's Mills, and other points.
May 26 – June 1, 1864	Combats at and about Dallas.
May 27, 1864	Skirmish at Pond Springs, Ala.
May 29, 1864	Action at Moulton, Ala.
June 9, 1864	Skirmishes near Big Shanty and near Stilesborough.
June 10, 1864	Skirmish at Calhoun.
June 10 – July 3, 1864	Operations about Marietta, with combats at Pine Hill, Lost Mountain, Brush Mountain, Gilgal Church, Noonday Creek, McAfee's Cross-Roads, Kennesaw Mountain, Powder Springs, Cheney's Farm, Kolb's Farm, Olley's Creek, Nicka-jack Creek, Noyes' Creek, and other points. Popular general Leonidas Polk killed.
June 24, 1864	Action at La Fayette.
June 27, 1864	Battle of Kennesaw Mountain
July 4, 1864	Skirmishes at Ruff's Mill, Neal Dow Station, and Rottenwood Creek.
July 5–17, 1864	Operations on the line of the Chattahoochee River, with skirmishes at Howell's, Turner's, and Pace's Ferries, Isham's Ford, and other points.
July 10–22, 1864	Rousseau's Opelika Raid raid from Decatur, Ala., to the West Point and Montgomery Railroad, with skirmishes near Coosa River (13th), near Greenpoint and at Ten Island Ford (14th), near Auburn, Ala and near Chehaw, Ala (18th).
July 18, 1864	Skirmish at Buck Head.
July 18, 1864	General John B. Hood, C. S. Army, supersedes General Joseph E. Johnston in command of the Army of Tennessee. Confederate Army Command Changed
July 19, 1864	Skirmishes on Peachtree Creek.
July 20, 1864	Battle of Peachtree Creek.
July 21, 1864	Engagement at Bald (or Leggett's) Hill.
July 22, 1864	Battle of Atlanta.
July 22, 1864	Maj. Gen. John A. Logan, U.S. Army, succeeds Maj. Gen. James B. McPherson in command of the Army of the Tennessee.
July 22–24, 1864	Garrard's raid to Covington.
July 23, 1864	Brig. Gen.Morgan L. Smith, U.S. Army, in temporary command of the Fifteenth Army Corps.
July 23 – August 25, 1864	Operations about Atlanta, including Battle of Ezra Church (July 28), assault at Utoy Creek (August 6), and other combats.
July 24, 1864	Skirmish near Cartersville.
July 27, 1864	Maj. Gen. Oliver O. Howard, U.S. Army, assumes command of the Army of the Tennessee.
July 27, 1864	Maj. Gen. John A. Logan, U.S. Army, resumes command of the Fifteenth Army Corps.
July 27, 1864	Maj. Gen. David S. Stanley, U.S. Army, succeeds Maj. Gen. Oliver O. Howard in command of the Fourth Army Corps.
July 27, 1864	Brig. Gen. Alpheus S. Williams, U.S. Army, succeeds Maj. Gen. Joseph Hooker in temporary command of the Twentieth Army Corps.
July 27–31, 1864	McCook's raid on the Atlanta and West Point and Macon and Western Railroads, with skirmishes near Campbellton (28th), near Lovejoy's Station (29th), at Clear Creek (30th), and action at Brown's Mill near Newnan (30th).
July 27–31, 1864	Garrard's raid to South River, with skirmishes at Snapfinger Creek (27th), Flat Rock Bridge and Lithonia (28th).
July 27 – August 6, 1864	Stoneman's raid to Macon, with combats at Macon and Clinton (July 30), Hillsborough (July 30–31), Mulberry Creek and Jug Tavern (August 8).
July 30, 1864	Maj. Gen. Henry W. Slocum, U.S. Army, assigned to the command of the Twentieth Army Corps.
August 7, 1864	Brig. Gen. Richard W. Johnson, U.S. Army, succeeds Maj. Gen. John M. Palmer in temporary command of the Fourteenth Army Corps.
August 9, 1864	Bvt. Maj. Gen. Jefferson C. Davis, U.S. Army, assigned to the command of the Fourteenth Army Corps.
August 10 – September 9, 1864	Wheeler's raid to North Georgia and East Tennessee, with combats at Dalton (August 14–15) and other points.
August 15, 1864	Skirmishes at Sandtown and Fairburn.
August 18–22, 1864	Kilpatrick's raid from Sandtown to Lovejoy's Station, with combats at Camp Creek (18th), Red Oak (19th), Flint River (19th), Jonesborough (19th), and Lovejoy's Station (20th).
August 22, 1864	Bvt. Maj. Gen. Jefferson C. Davis, U.S. Army, assumes command of the Fourteenth Army Corps.
August 26 – September 1, 1864	Operations at the Chattahoochee railroad bridge and at Pace's and Turner's Ferries, with skirmishes.
August 27, 1864	Maj. Gen. Henry W. Slocum, U.S. Army, assumes command of the Twentieth Army Corps.
August 29, 1864	Skirmish near Red Oak.
August 30, 1864	Skirmish near East Point.
August 30, 1864	Action at Flint River Bridge.
August 31, 1864	Skirmish near Rough and Ready Station.
August 31 – September 1, 1864	Battle of Jonesborough.
September 2, 1864	Union occupation of Atlanta.
September 2–5, 1864	Actions at Lovejoy's Station.

== Battles ==
=== Sherman vs. Johnston ===
Map of the Atlanta Campaign (May 7 – September 2, 1864). Confederate Union

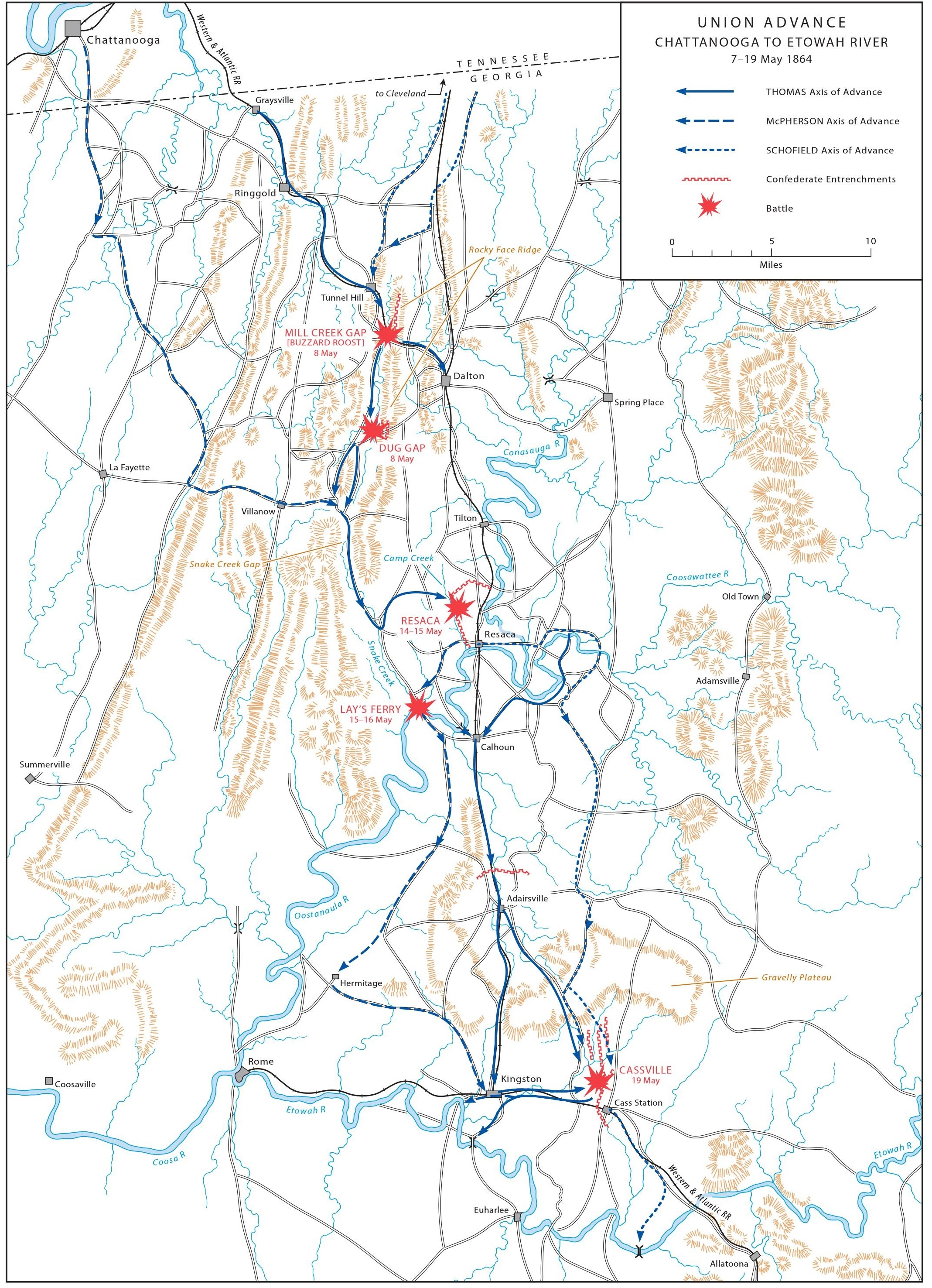
ATLANTA CAMPAIGN, Union advance: Chattanooga to Etowah (May 7–19, 1864).

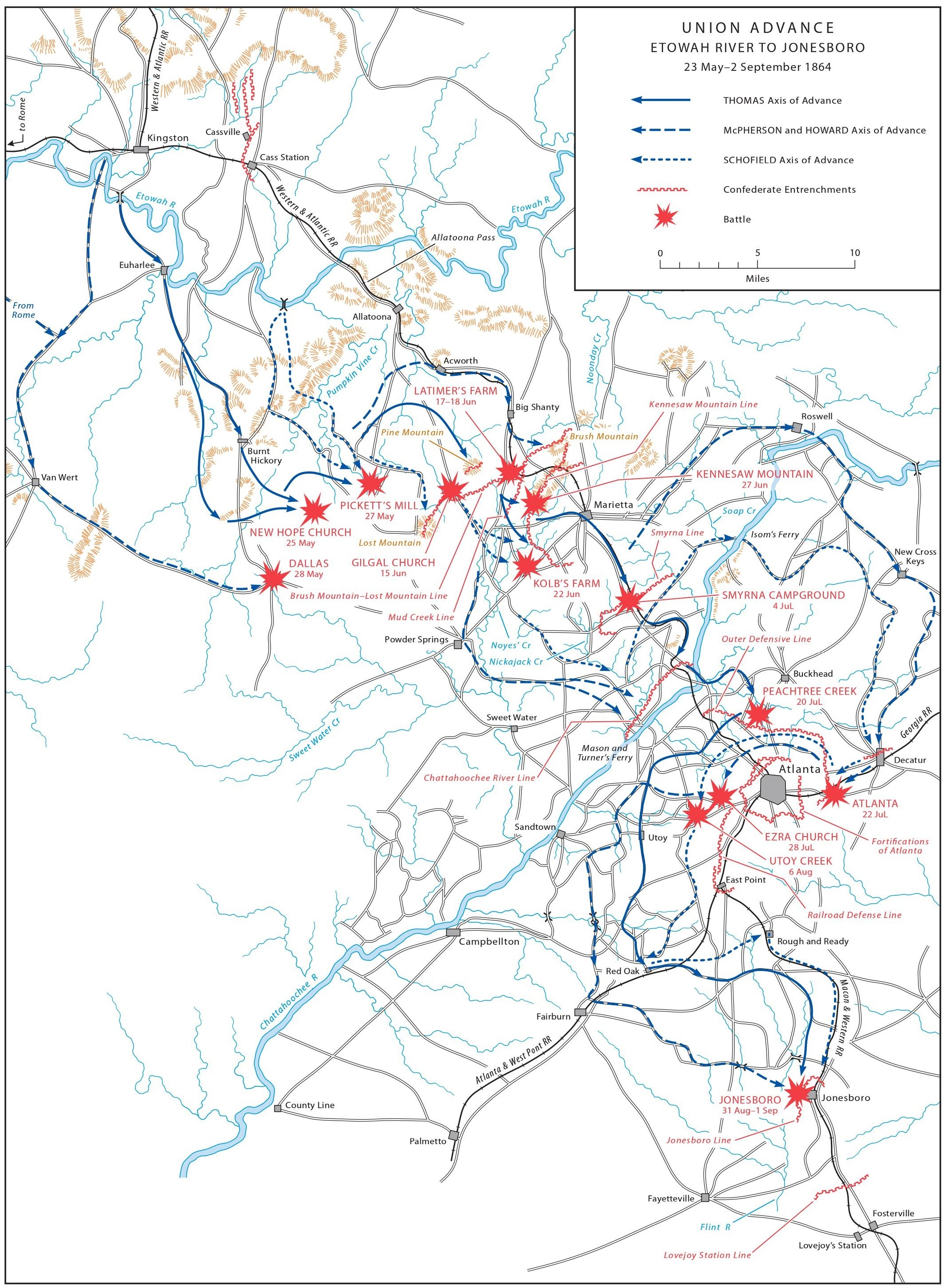
ATLANTA CAMPAIGN, Union advance: Etowah River to Jonesboro (May 23 – September 2, 1864).

==== Rocky Face Ridge (May 7–13, 1864) ====
Johnston had entrenched his army on the long, high mountain of Rocky Face Ridge and eastward across Crow Valley. Sherman had earlier decided to demonstrate against the strong Confederate position with the bulk of his force while he sent a smaller portion through Snake Creek Gap, to the right, to hit the Western & Atlantic Railroad at Resaca, Georgia. With sufficient men, the Union Army could cut off the Confederate lines of communication to the south and force Johnston to attack them or disperse his army traveling through the rough terrain to the east. The larger Union force engaged the enemy at Buzzard Roost (Mill Creek Gap) and at Dug Gap drawing away their attention. In the meantime, the third column, under McPherson, passed unnoticed through Snake Creek Gap and on May 9 advanced to the outskirts of Resaca, where it found a small Confederate force entrenched. Fearing defeat, McPherson pulled his column back to Snake Creek Gap, which Sherman's orders gave him authority to do. On May 10, Sherman decided to take most of his men and join McPherson to take Resaca. The next morning, as he discovered Sherman's army withdrawing from their positions in front of Rocky Face Ridge, Johnston retired south towards Resaca. So began the first of a long series of flanking maneuvers by Sherman against Johnston; Sherman became so good at the tactic that his men boasted that Sherman "could flank the devil out of hell, if necessary." Johnston would be flanked out of every position he held until eventually relieved of command. The opportunity to destroy or disorganize the Confederates in the campaign's first battle, however, was missed.

==== Resaca (May 13–15) ====
Union troops tested the Confederate lines around Resaca to pinpoint their whereabouts. Full scale fighting occurred on May 14, and the Union troops were generally repulsed except on Johnston's right flank, where Sherman did not fully exploit his advantage. On May 15, the battle continued with no advantage to either side until Sherman sent a force across the Oostanaula River at Lay's Ferry, towards Johnston's railroad supply line. Unable to halt this Union movement, Johnston was forced to retire.

==== Adairsville (May 17) ====
Johnston's army retreated southward while Sherman pursued. Failing to find a good defensive position south of Calhoun, Johnston continued to Adairsville while the Confederate cavalry fought a skillful rearguard action. On May 17, Howard's IV Corps ran into entrenched infantry of Hardee's corps, while advancing about two miles (3.2 km) north of Adairsville. Three Union divisions prepared for battle, but Thomas halted them because of the approach of darkness. Sherman then concentrated his men in the Adairsville area to attack Johnston the next day. Johnston had originally expected to find a valley at Adairsville of suitable width to deploy his men and anchor his line with the flanks on hills, but the valley was too wide, so Johnston disengaged and withdrew.

==== New Hope Church (May 25–26) ====
After Johnston retreated to Allatoona Pass from May 19 to 20, Sherman decided that attacking Johnston there would be too costly, so he determined to move around Johnston's left flank and steal a march toward Dallas. Johnston anticipated Sherman's move and met the Union forces at New Hope Church. Sherman mistakenly surmised that Johnston had a token force and ordered Hooker's XX Corps to attack. This corps was severely mauled. On May 26, both sides entrenched.

==== Dallas (May 26 – June 1) ====
Sherman's army tested the Confederate line. On May 28, Hardee's corps probed the Union defensive line, held by Logan's XV Corps, to exploit any weakness or possible withdrawal. Fighting ensued at two different points, but the Confederates were repulsed, suffering high casualties. Sherman continued looking for a way around Johnston's line, and on June 1, his cavalry occupied Allatoona Pass, which had a railroad and would allow his men and supplies to reach him by train. Sherman abandoned his lines at Dallas on June 5 and moved toward the railhead at Allatoona Pass, forcing Johnston to follow soon afterward.

==== Pickett's Mill (May 27) ====
After the Union defeat at New Hope Church, Sherman ordered Howard to attack Johnston's seemingly exposed right flank. The Confederates were ready for the attack, which did not unfold as planned because supporting troops never appeared. The Confederates repulsed the attack, causing high casualties.

==== Operations around Marietta (June 9 – July 3) ====
When Sherman first found Johnston entrenched in the Marietta area on June 9, he began extending his lines beyond the Confederate lines, causing some Confederate withdrawal to new positions. On June 14, Lt. Gen. Leonidas Polk was killed by an artillery shell while scouting enemy positions with Hardee and Johnston and was temporarily replaced by Maj. Gen. William W. Loring. On June 18–19, Johnston, fearing envelopment, moved his army to a new, previously selected position astride Kennesaw Mountain, an entrenched arc-shaped line to the west of Marietta, to protect his supply line, the Western & Atlantic Railroad. Sherman made some unsuccessful attacks on this position but eventually extended the line on his right and forced Johnston to withdraw from the Marietta area on July 2–3.

==== Kolb's Farm (June 22) ====
Having encountered entrenched Confederates astride Kennesaw Mountain stretching southward, Sherman fixed them in front and extended his right wing to envelop their flank and menace the railroad. Johnston countered by moving Hood's corps from the left flank to the right on June 22. Arriving in his new position at Mt. Zion Church, Hood decided on his own to attack. Warned of Hood's intentions, Union generals John M. Schofield and Joseph Hooker entrenched. Union artillery and swampy terrain thwarted Hood's attack and forced him to withdraw with heavy casualties. Although he was the victor, Sherman's attempts at envelopment had momentarily failed.

==== Kennesaw Mountain (June 27) ====
This battle was a notable exception to Sherman's policy in the campaign of avoiding frontal assaults and moving around the enemy's left flank. Sherman was sure that Johnston had stretched his line on Kennesaw Mountain too thin and decided on a frontal attack with some diversions on the flanks. On the morning of June 27, Sherman sent his troops forward after an artillery bombardment. At first, they made some headway overrunning Confederate pickets south of the Burnt Hickory Road, but attacking an enemy that was dug in was futile. The fighting ended by noon, and Sherman suffered heavy casualties, about 3,000, compared with 1,000 for the Confederates. Johnston fell back toward Smyrna on July 3 and by July 4 to a defensive line along the west bank of the Chattahoochee River that became known as Johnston's River Line.

==== Pace's Ferry (July 5) ====
Johnston put the Chattahoochee River between his army and Sherman's. General Howard's IV corps advanced on Pace's Ferry on the river. The Confederate pontoon bridge there was defended by dismounted cavalry. They were driven away by BG Thomas J. Wood's division of IV Corps. The bridge, although damaged, was captured. Howard decided not to force a crossing against increased Confederate opposition. When federal pontoons arrived on July 8, Howard crossed the river and outflanked the Pace's Ferry defenders. This forced them to withdraw; and this permitted Sherman to cross the river, advancing closer to Atlanta. Johnston abandoned the River Line and retired south of Peachtree Creek, about three miles (4.8 km) north of Atlanta.

=== Sherman vs. Hood ===
Due to public pressure, Confederate President Jefferson Davis had become increasingly irate at Johnston giving ground. Finally, on July 17, Davis stripped Johnston of command and replaced him with John B. Hood. Hood may have seemed a more able commander than Johnston, especially on the attack, as seen at Gettysburg, but the Army of Tennessee was short on men, talent, and luck. Sherman had been frustrated by Johnston's defensive tactics and was reportedly pleased with the change as the aggressive Hood was more willing to do open battle, thus giving Sherman opportunities to use his superior numbers and firepower to destroy Confederate forces.

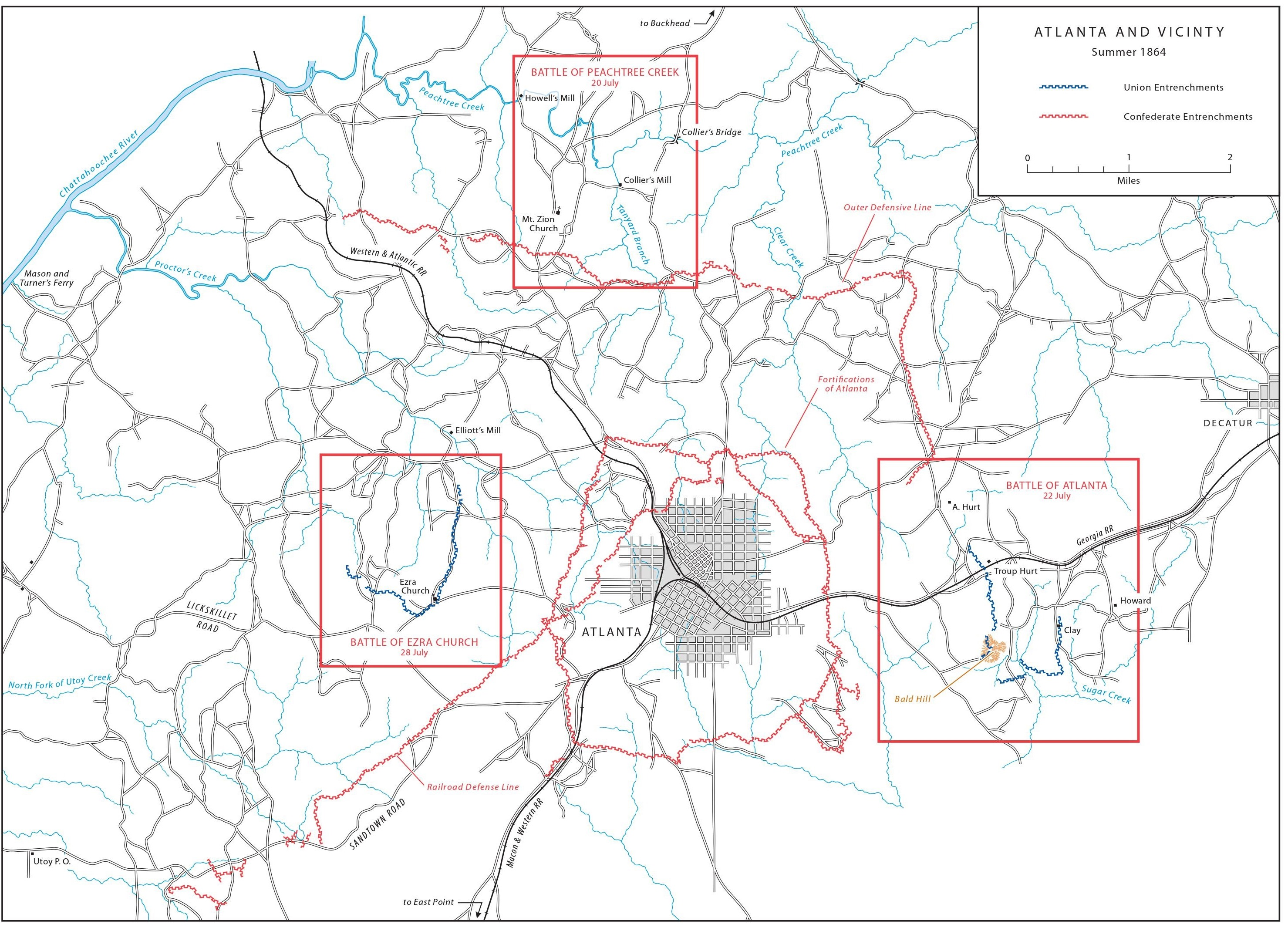
ATLANTA CAMPAIGN: Atlanta and Vicinity (Summer 1864).

==== Peachtree Creek (July 20) ====
After crossing the Chattahoochee, Sherman split his army into three columns for the assault on Atlanta with Thomas' Army of the Cumberland, on the left, moving from the north. Schofield and McPherson had drawn away to the east, leaving Thomas on his own. Johnston decided to attack Thomas as he crossed the creek, but Confederate President Jefferson Davis relieved him of command and appointed Hood to take his place. Hood adopted Johnston's plan and attacked Thomas after his army crossed Peachtree Creek. The determined assault threatened to overrun the Union troops at various locations, but eventually the Union held, and the Confederates fell back. The advance of McPherson from the east side of Atlanta distracted Hood from his offensive and drew off Confederate troops that might have joined the attack on Thomas.

==== Atlanta (July 22) ====
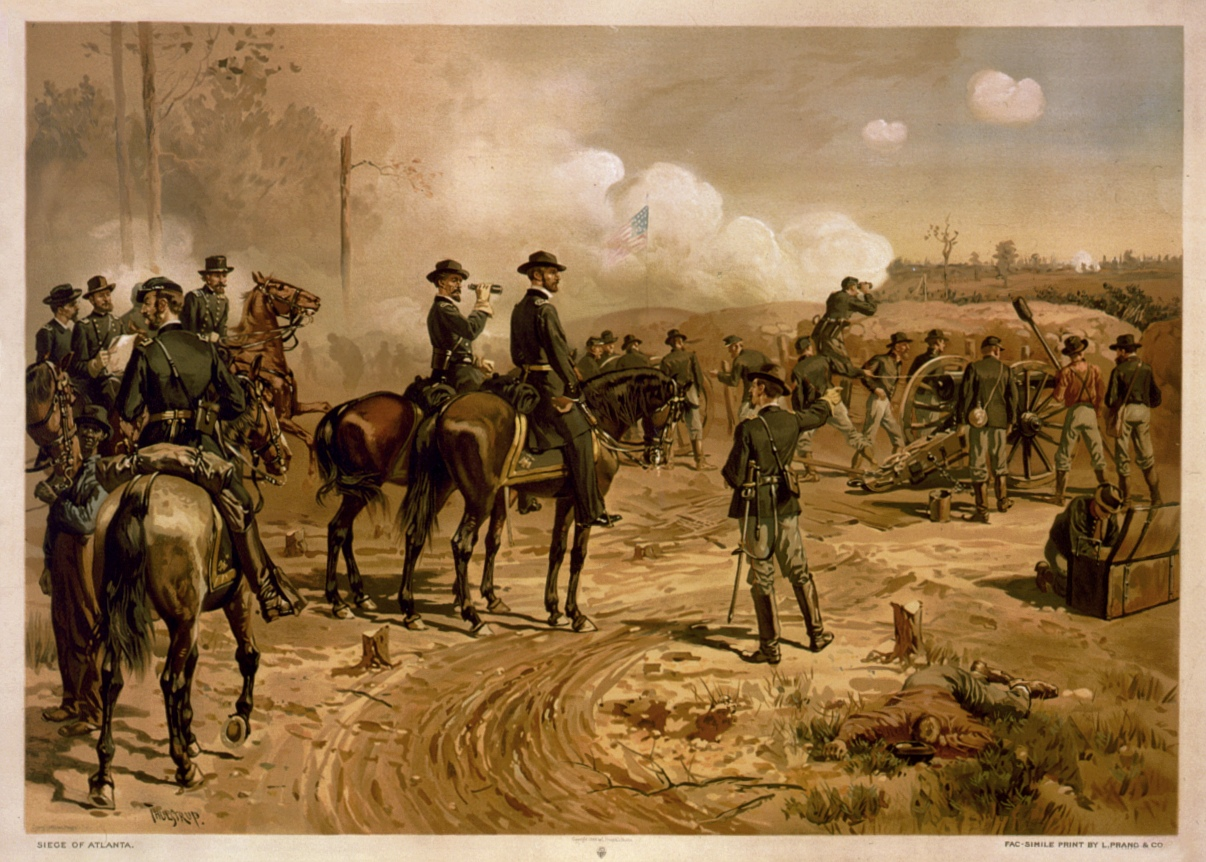
The Siege of Atlanta by Thure de Thulstrup (c. 1888)

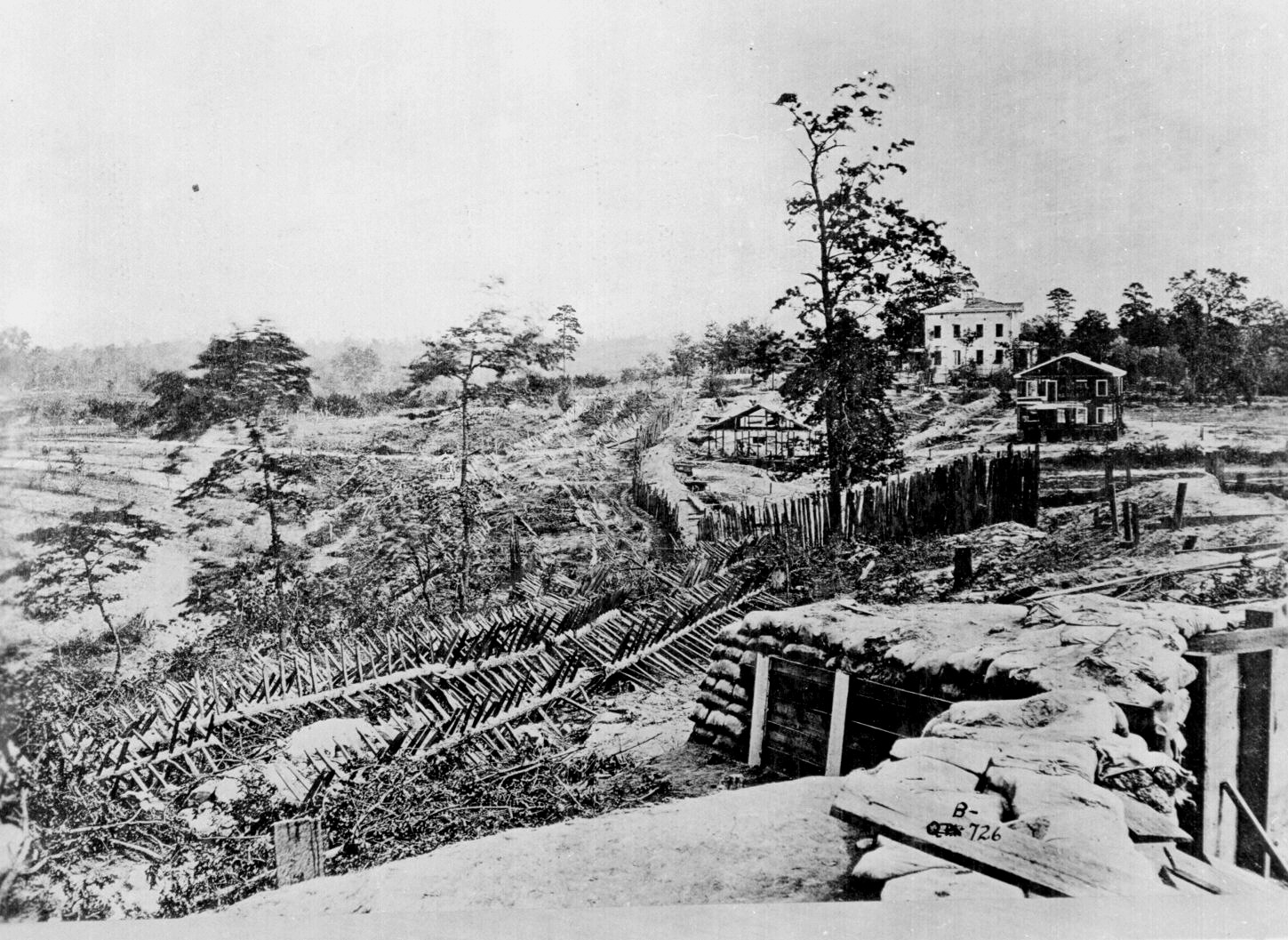
Palisades and chevaux-de-frise in front of the Ponder House, Atlanta, Georgia, 1864

Hood was determined to attack McPherson's Army of the Tennessee. He withdrew his main army at night from Atlanta's outer line to the inner line, enticing Sherman to follow. In the meantime, he sent William J. Hardee with his corps on a fifteen-mile (24 km) march to hit the unprotected Union left and rear, east of the city. Wheeler's cavalry was to operate farther out on Sherman's supply line, and Cheatham's corps was to attack the Union front. Hood, however, miscalculated the time necessary to make the march, and Hardee was unable to attack until afternoon. Although Hood had outmaneuvered Sherman for the time being, McPherson was concerned about his left flank and sent his reserves—Dodge's XVI Corps—to that location. Two of Hood's divisions ran into this reserve force and were repulsed. The Confederate attack stalled on the Union rear but began to roll up the left flank. Around the same time, a Confederate soldier shot and killed McPherson when he rode out to observe the fighting. Determined attacks continued, but the Union forces held. About 4 p.m., Cheatham's corps broke through the Union front, but massed artillery near Sherman's headquarters halted the Confederate assault. Logan's XV Corps then led a counterattack that restored the Union line. The Union troops held, and Hood suffered high casualties.

Despite being called the Battle of Atlanta, the city itself would not fall until September.

==== Ezra Church (July 28) ====
Sherman's forces had previously approached Atlanta from the east and north and had not been able to break through, so Sherman decided to attack from the west. He ordered Howard's Army of the Tennessee to move from the left wing to the right and cut Hood's last railroad supply line between East Point and Atlanta. Hood foresaw such a maneuver and sent the two corps of Lt. Gen. Stephen D. Lee and Lt. Gen. Alexander P. Stewart to intercept and destroy the Union force at Ezra Church. Howard had anticipated such a thrust, entrenched one of his corps in the Confederates' path, and repulsed the determined attack, inflicting numerous casualties. Howard, however, failed to cut the railroad. Concurrent attempts by two columns of Union cavalry to cut the railroads south of Atlanta ended in failure, with one division under Maj. Gen. Edward M. McCook completely smashed at the Battle of Brown's Mill and the other force also repulsed and its commander, Maj. Gen. George Stoneman, taken prisoner.

==== Utoy Creek (August 5–7) ====
After failing to envelop Hood's left flank at Ezra Church, Sherman still wanted to extend his right flank to hit the railroad between East Point and Atlanta. He transferred Schofield's Army of the Ohio from his left to his right flank and sent him to the north bank of Utoy Creek. Although Schofield's troops were at Utoy Creek on August 2, they, along with the XIV Corps, Army of the Cumberland, did not cross until August 4. Schofield's force began its movement to exploit this situation on the morning of August 5, which was initially successful. Schofield then had to regroup his forces, which took the rest of the day. The delay allowed the Confederates to strengthen their defenses with abatis, which slowed the Union attack when it restarted on the morning of August 6. The Federals were repulsed with heavy losses and failed in an attempt to break the railroad. On August 7, the Union troops moved toward the Confederate main line and entrenched. They remained there until late August.

==== Dalton (August 14–15) ====
Wheeler and his cavalry raided into North Georgia to destroy railroad tracks and supplies. They approached Dalton in the late afternoon of August 14 and demanded the surrender of the garrison. The Union commander refused to surrender and fighting ensued. Greatly outnumbered, the Union garrison retired to fortifications on a hill outside the town where they successfully held out, although the attack continued until after midnight. Around 5 a.m. on August 15, Wheeler retired and became engaged with relieving infantry and cavalry under Maj. Gen. James B. Steedman's command. Eventually, Wheeler withdrew.

==== Lovejoy's Station (August 20) ====
While Wheeler was absent raiding Union supply lines from North Georgia to East Tennessee, Sherman sent cavalry Brig. Gen. Judson Kilpatrick to raid Confederate supply lines. Leaving on August 18, Kilpatrick hit the Atlanta & West Point Railroad that evening, tearing up a small area of tracks. Next, he headed for Lovejoy's Station on the Macon & Western Railroad. In transit, on August 19, Kilpatrick's men hit the Jonesborough supply depot on the Macon & Western Railroad, burning great amounts of supplies. On August 20, they reached Lovejoy's Station and began their destruction. Confederate infantry (Patrick Cleburne's Division) appeared and the raiders were forced to fight into the night, finally fleeing to prevent encirclement. Although Kilpatrick had destroyed supplies and track at Lovejoy's Station, the railroad line was back in operation in two days.

==== Jonesborough (August 31 – September 1) ====
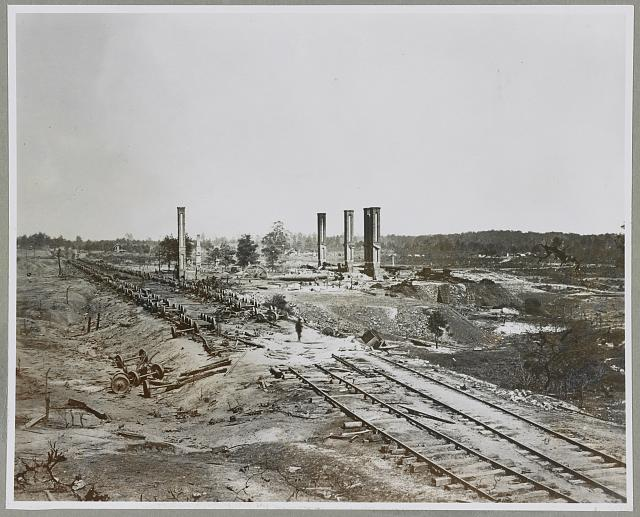
Ruins of Rolling Mill and railroad cars destroyed by rebels on evacuation of Atlanta, Ga.

In late August, Sherman determined that if he could cut Hood's railroad supply lines, the Confederates would have to evacuate Atlanta. Sherman had successfully cut Hood's supply lines in the past by sending out detachments of cavalry, but the Confederates quickly repaired the damage. He therefore decided to move six of his seven infantry corps against the supply lines. The army began pulling out of its positions on August 25 to hit the Macon & Western Railroad between Rough and Ready and Jonesborough. To counter the move, Hood sent Hardee with two corps to halt and possibly rout the Union troops, not realizing Sherman's army was there in force. On August 31, Hardee attacked two Union corps west of Jonesborough but was easily repulsed. Fearing an attack on Atlanta, Hood withdrew one corps from Hardee's force that night. The next day, a Union corps broke through Hardee's line, and his troops retreated to Lovejoy's Station. Sherman had cut Hood's supply line but he had failed to destroy Hardee's command.

==== Fall of Atlanta (September 2) ====
On the night of September 1, Hood evacuated Atlanta and ordered that the 81 rail cars filled with ammunition and other military supplies be destroyed. The resulting fire and explosions were heard for miles. (Note: Destruction of the Ordnance train and the Rolling Mill were dramatized in the 1939 film Gone with the Wind. Eyewitness accounts do not indicate that the fire spread beyond the rail yard.) Union troops under the command of Gen. Henry W. Slocum occupied Atlanta on September 2.

On September 4, General Sherman issued Special Field Order #64. General Sherman announced to his troops that "The army having accomplished its undertaking in the complete reduction and occupation of Atlanta will occupy the place and the country near it until a new campaign is planned in concert with the other grand armies of the United States."

== Aftermath ==
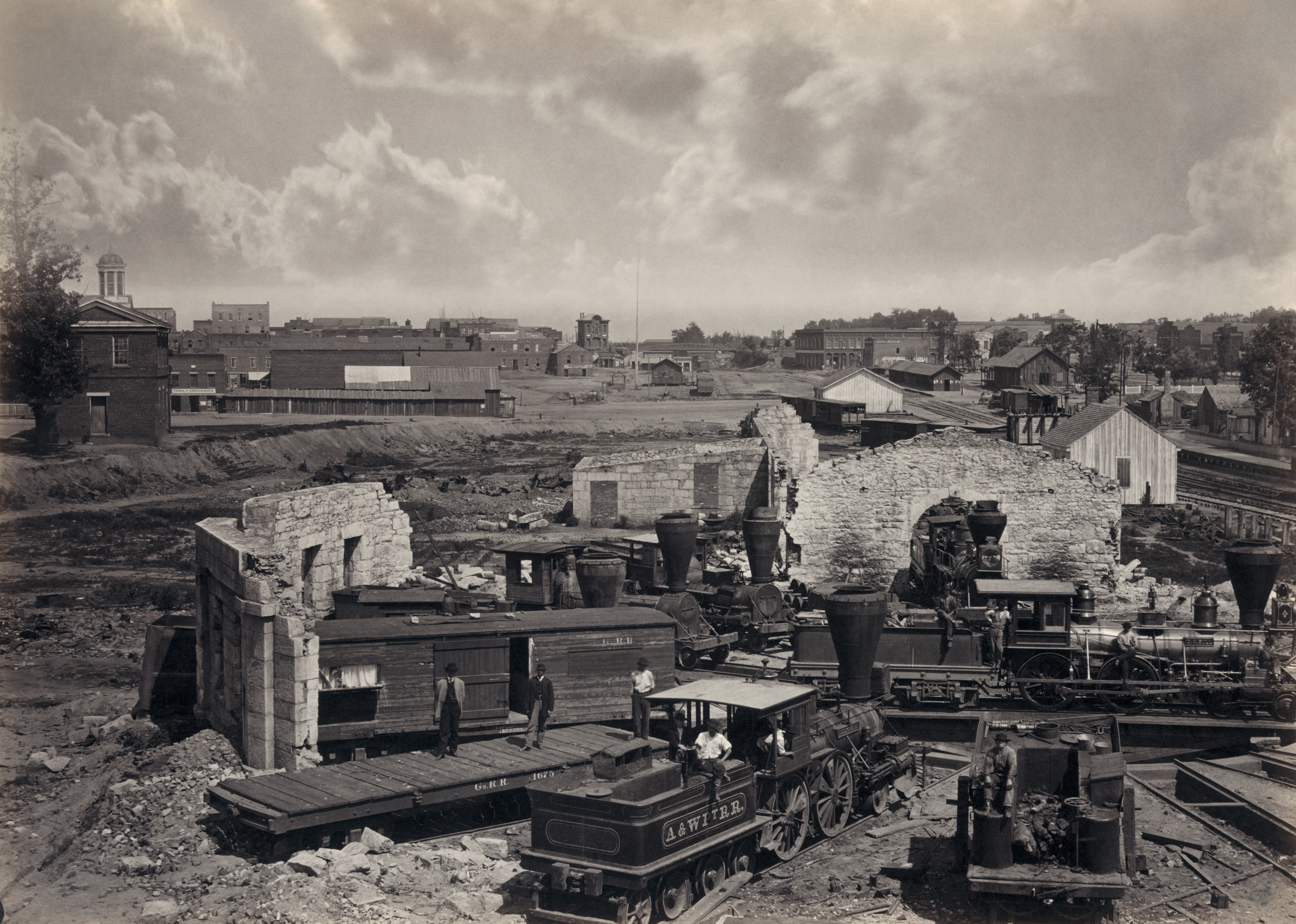
Roundhouse in Atlanta, following extensive damage from the Atlanta Campaign. Digitally restored albumen print, 1866.

Sherman was victorious, and Hood established a reputation as the most recklessly aggressive general in the Confederate Army. Casualties for the campaign were roughly equal in absolute numbers: 31,687 Union (4,423 killed, 22,822 wounded, 4,442 missing/captured) and 34,979 Confederate (3,044 killed, 18,952 wounded, 12,983 missing/captured). But this represented a much higher Confederate proportional loss. Hood's army left the area with approximately 30,000 men, whereas Sherman retained 81,000. Sherman's victory was qualified because it did not fulfill the original mission of the campaign—destroy the Army of Tennessee—and Sherman has been criticized for allowing his opponent to escape. However, the capture of Atlanta made an enormous contribution to Union morale and was an important factor in the re-election of President Abraham Lincoln.

Sherman realized that garrisoning Atlanta long-term would be a waste of troops, and that eventually the city would need to be abandoned. But first the army needed to be replenished, and so Sherman occupied Atlanta for the time being. Though the city was already mostly empty, about 1,600 civilians remained (compared to about 10,000 before the war) and Sherman felt their presence would be an obstacle. So, on September 14 Sherman issued Special Field Orders No. 67, which demanded the evacuation of the civilian population.

Hood, though he had been unable to hold Atlanta, now planned a counter-action. But the details were divulged in a speech given by Confederate President Davis, which provided Sherman a clear view of Hood's strategy. Sherman left Atlanta garrisoned with only a single Corps, and took the rest of the army to chase down Hood in the Franklin–Nashville campaign. Despite the divulging of Hood's plans, Hood was able to seize the initiative, briefly drawing Sherman north from Atlanta. The chase lasted through November, before Sherman returned the army to Atlanta to prepare for the March to the Sea. Despite Hood and Sherman's armies being the main forces in the western theater, they would not meet again, and Hood's army would be effectively destroyed by George Henry Thomas instead. Sherman's Army returned to Atlanta on November 12, spending just a few days to destroy anything of military value, including the railroads. Sherman's move was to be an evolution in warfare: without railroads for supply, the Army would have to live off the land. The Army withdrew from Atlanta on November 15, and so began Sherman's March to the Sea.

== Additional battle maps ==
Gallery: the Atlanta Campaign from the Atlas to Accompany the Official Records of the Union and Confederate Armies.

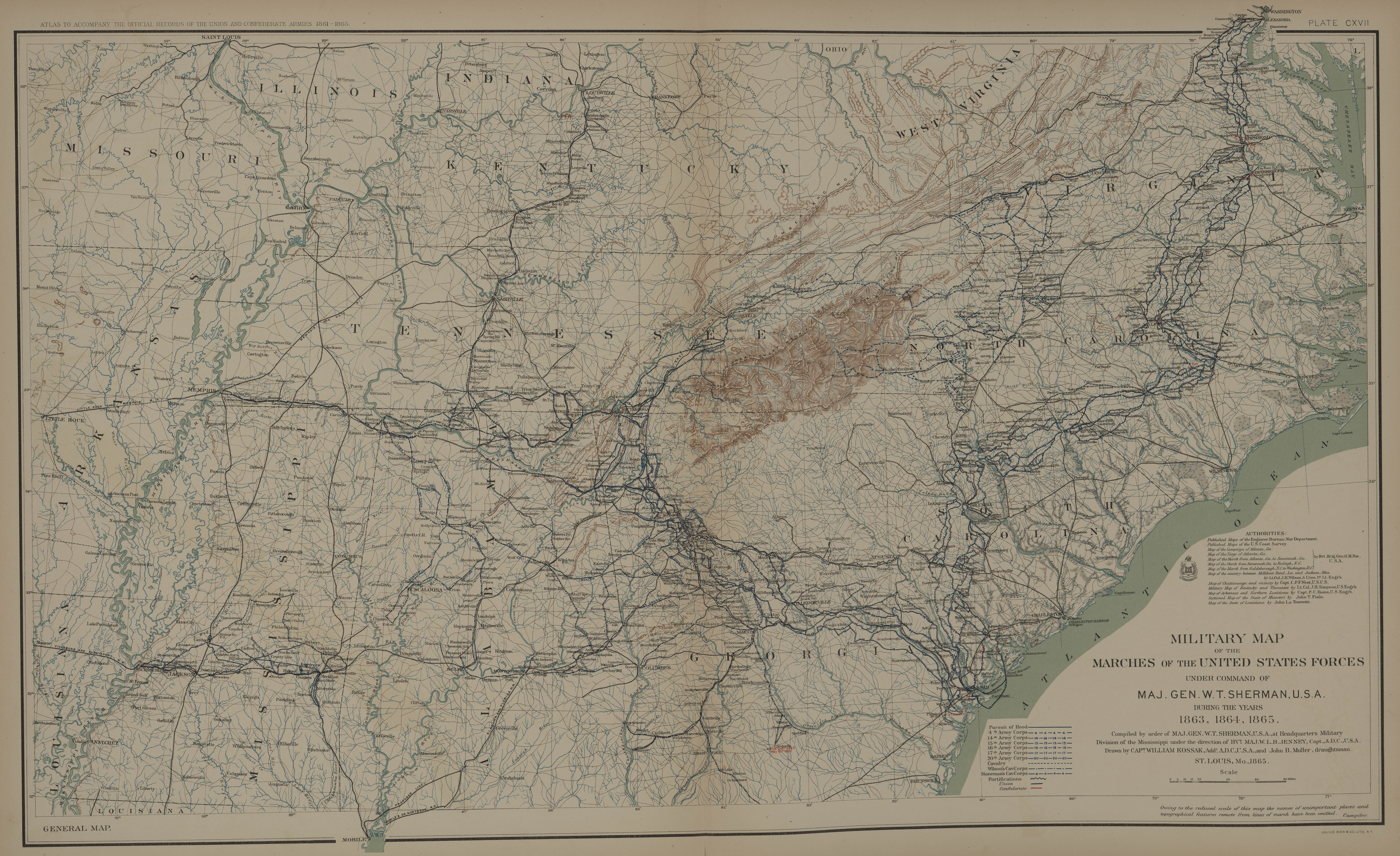
Map 1:
Sherman's advance: Tennessee, Georgia and Carolinas (1863–65).

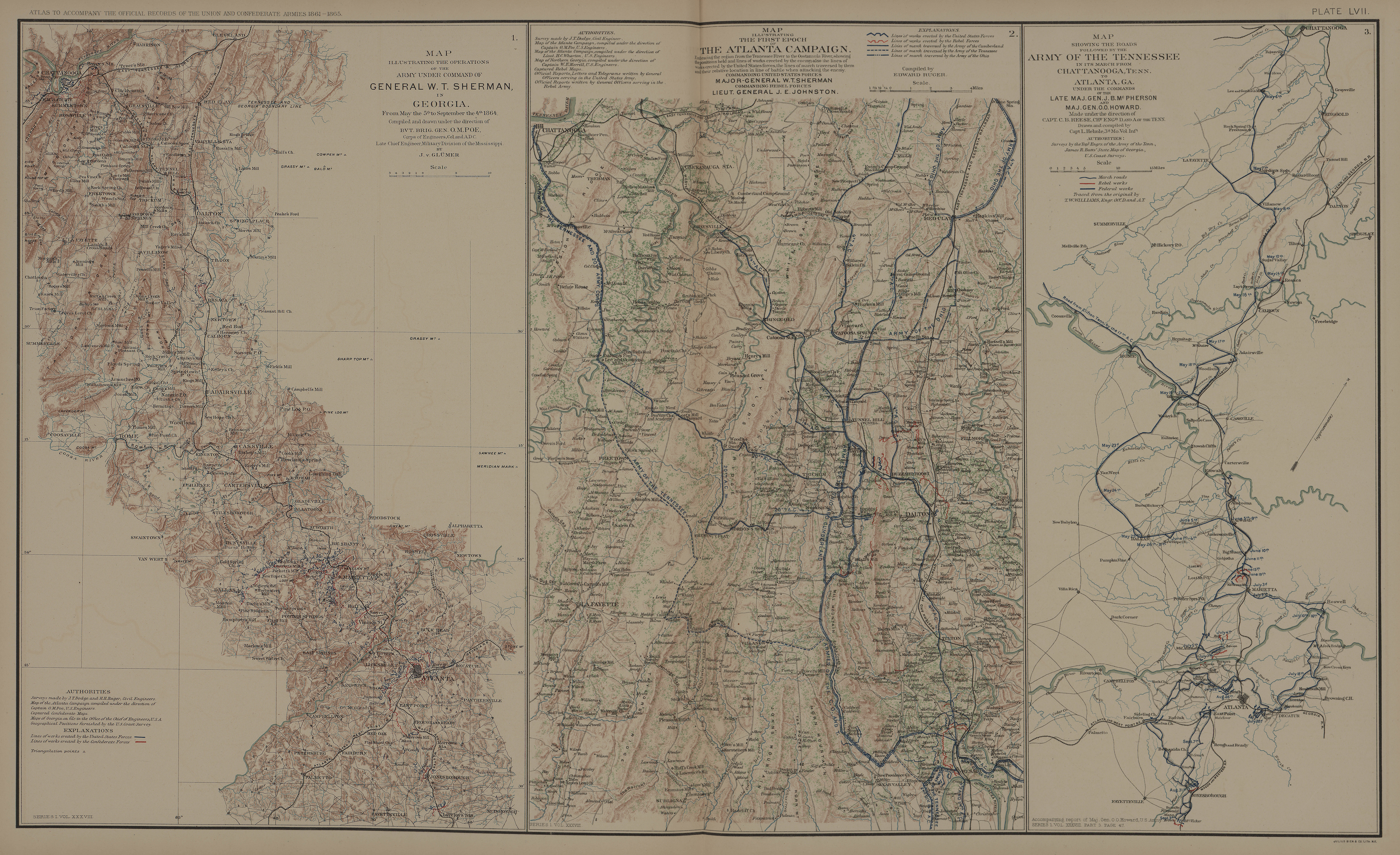
Map 2:
Atlanta Campaign: First epoch.

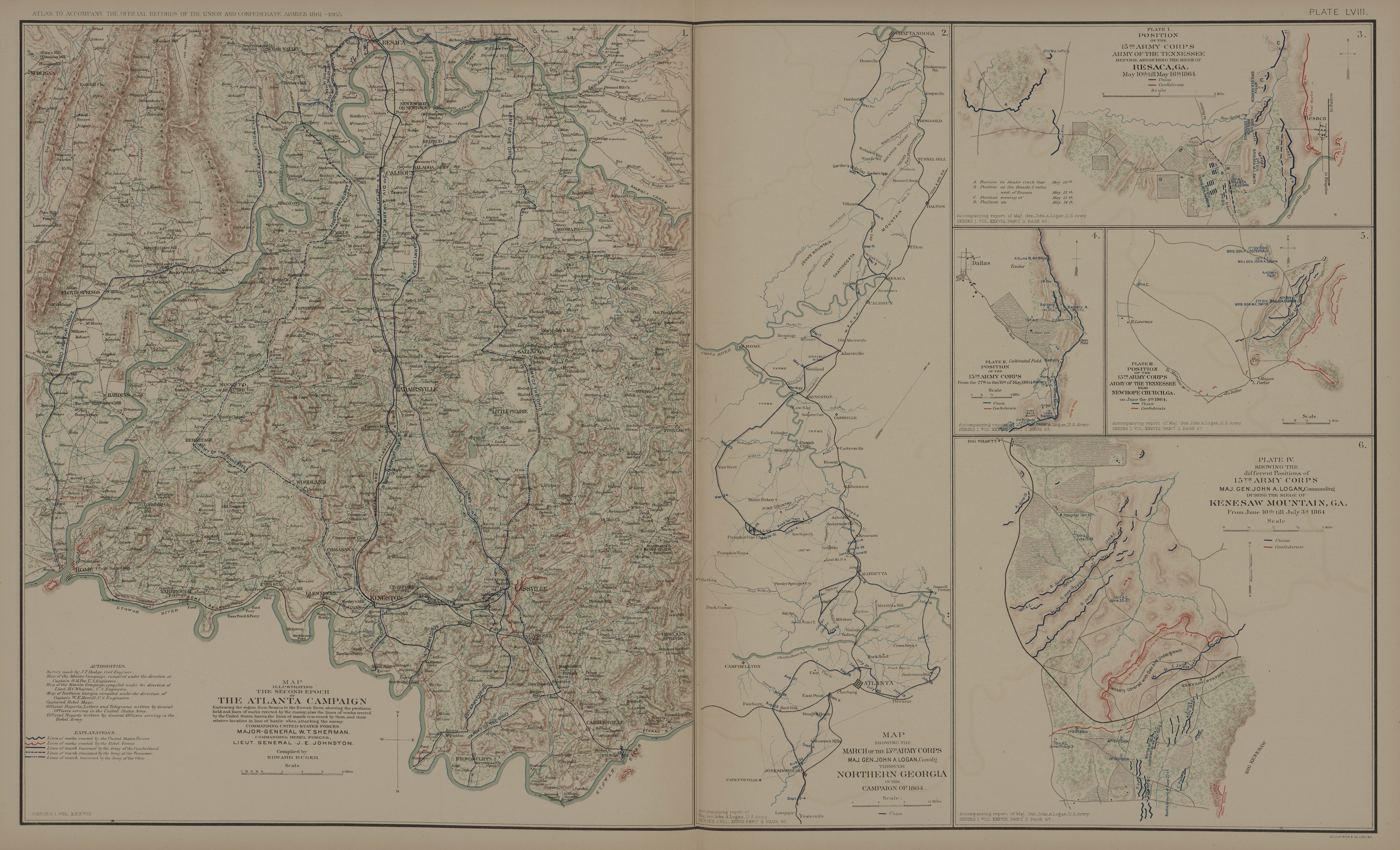
Map 3:
Atlanta Campaign: Second epoch.

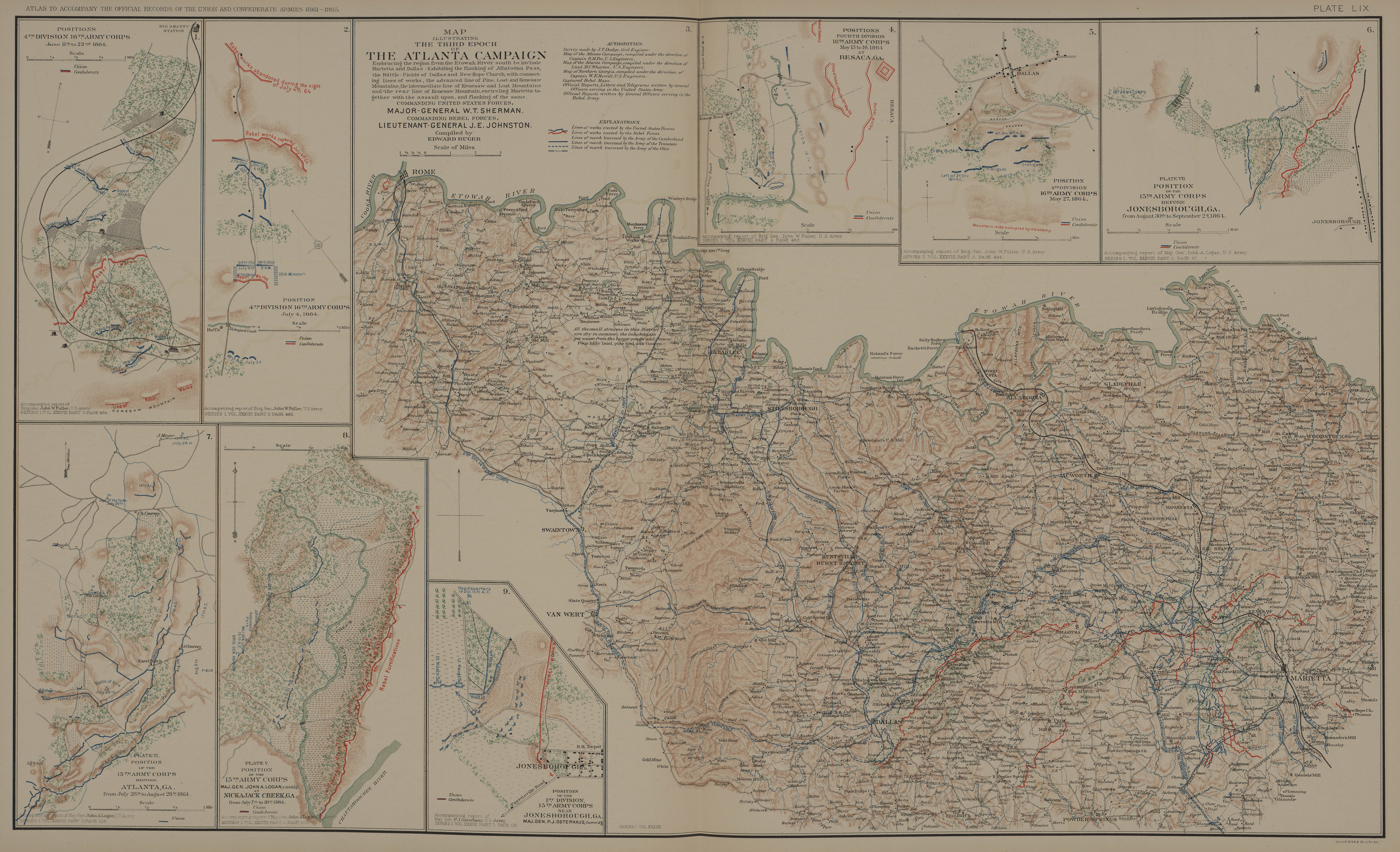
Map 3:
Atlanta Campaign: Third epoch.

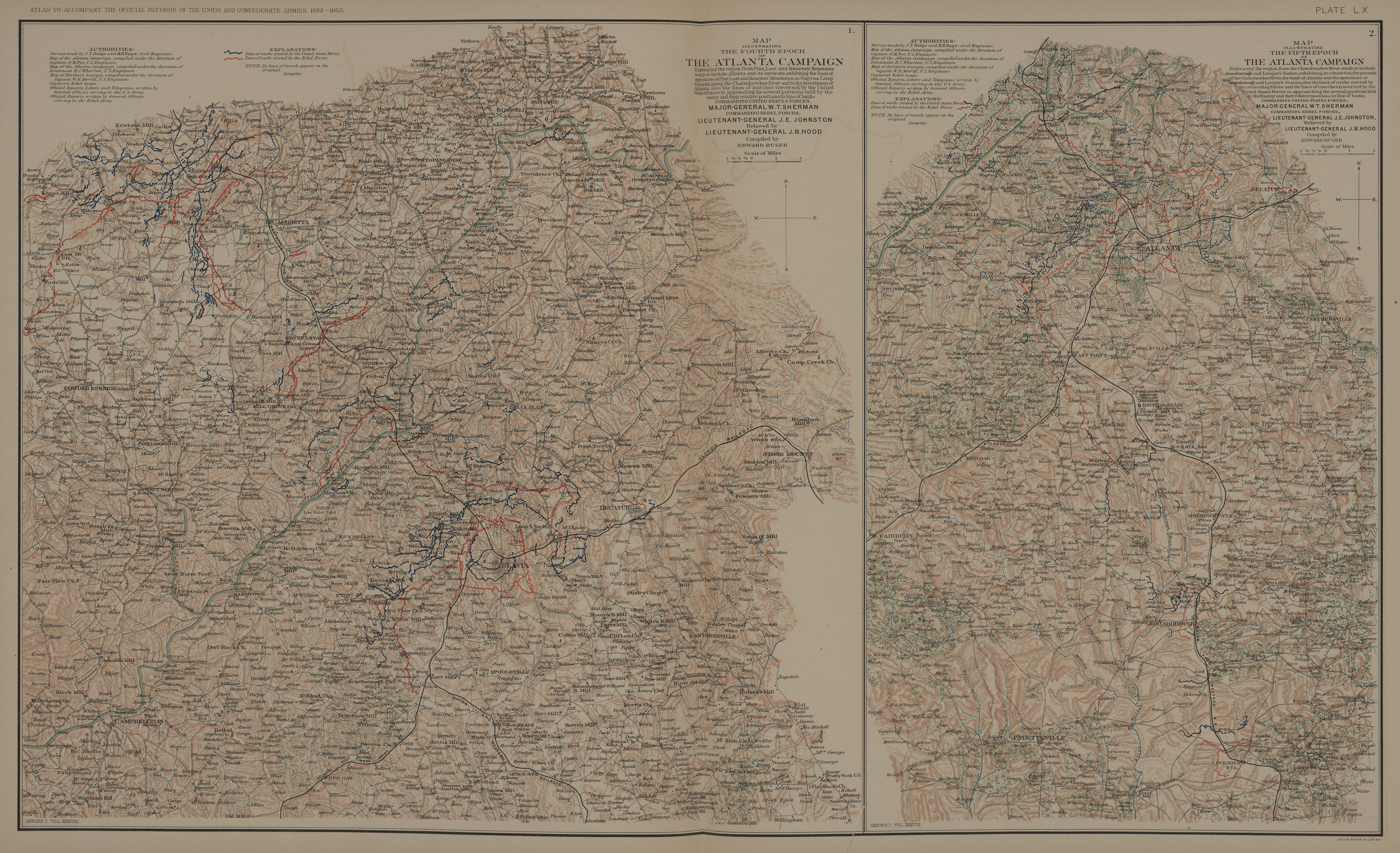
Maps 4-5:
Atlanta Campaign: Fourth and Fifth epoch.

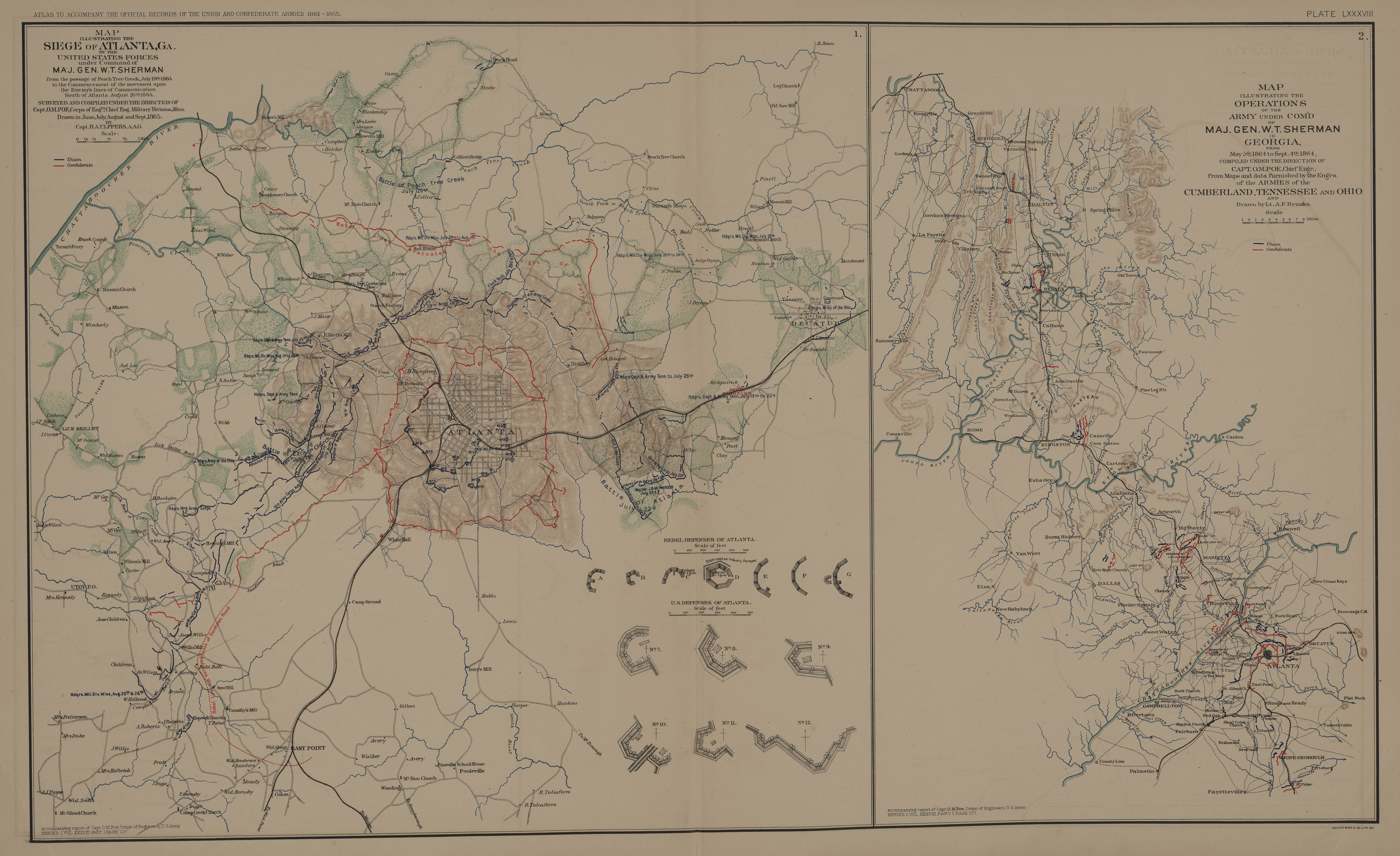
Map 6:
Atlanta Campaign: Siege of Atlanta.

Gallery: Additional maps.

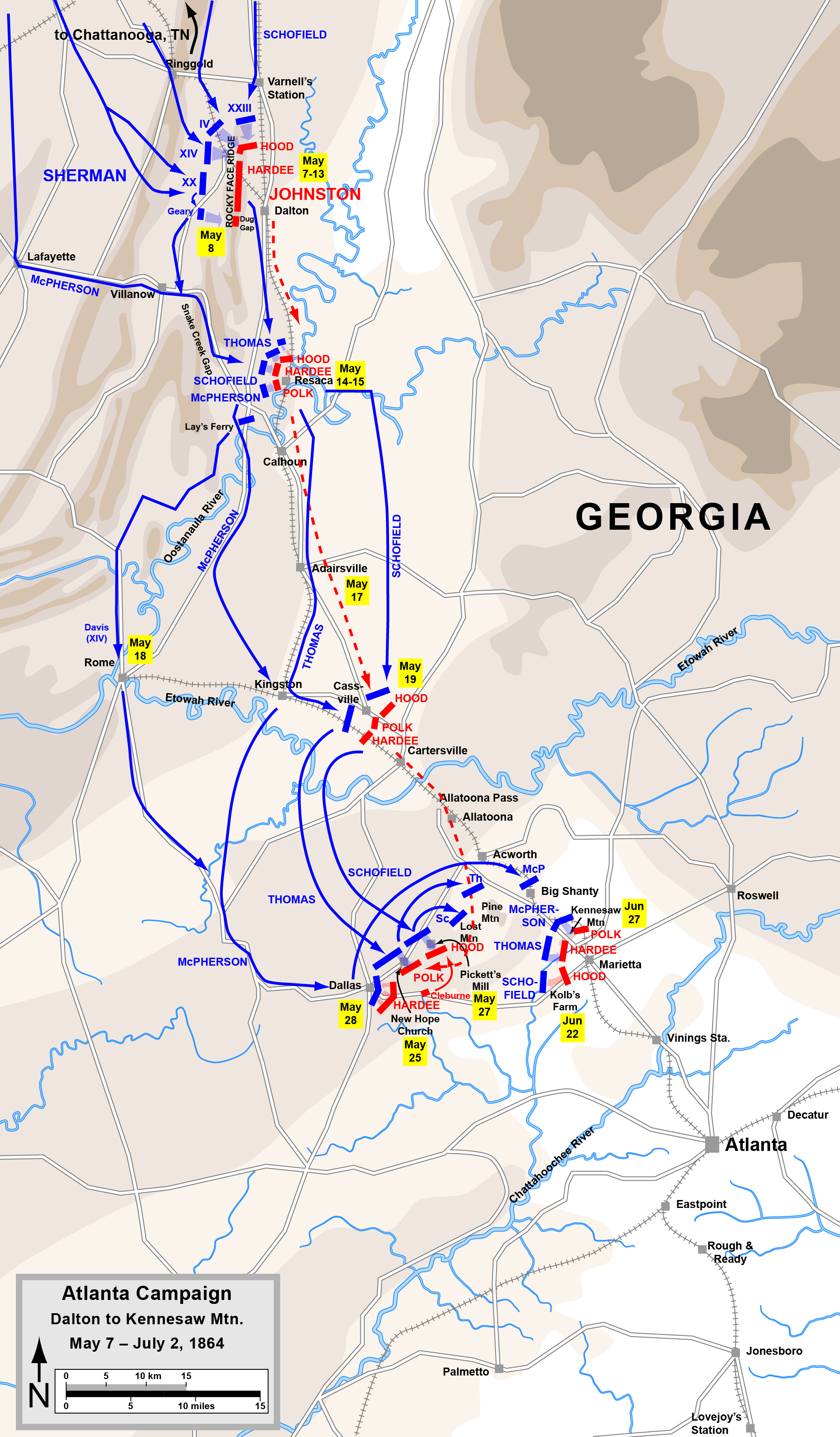
Map 1:
The Atlanta Campaign from Dalton to Kennesaw Mountain (May 7 – July 2, 1864).

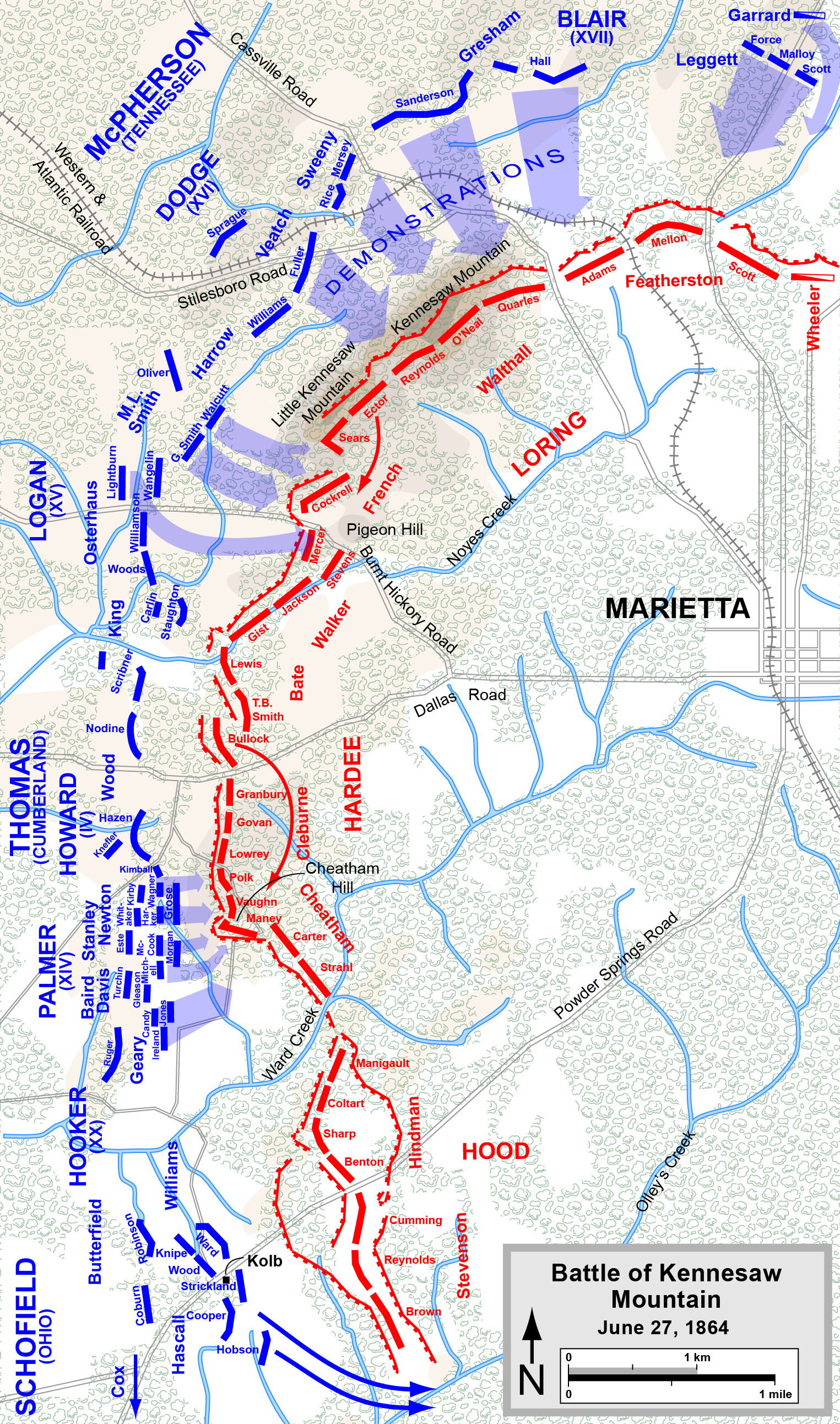
Map 2:
Battle of Kennesaw Mountain, June 27, 1864.

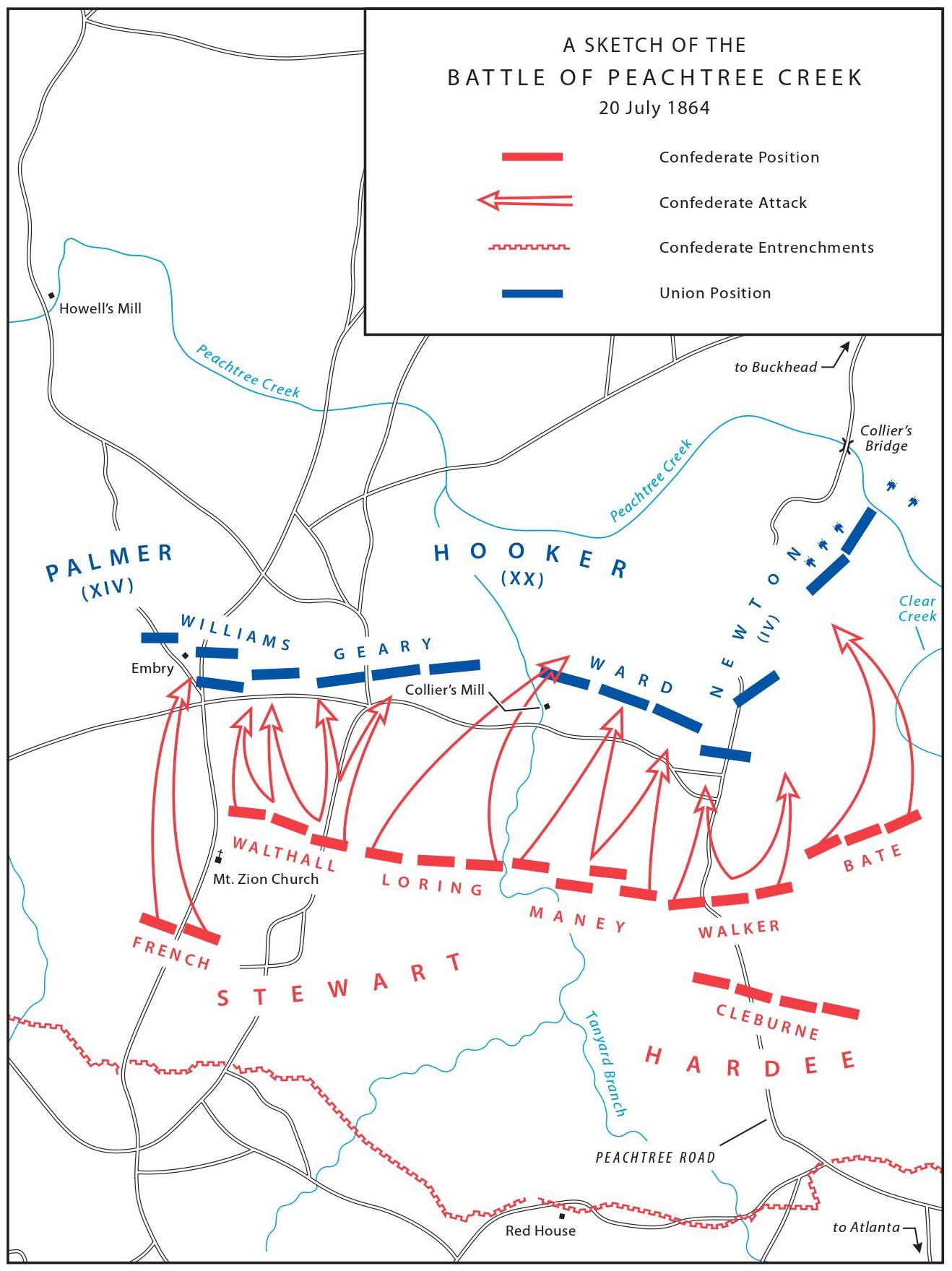
Map 3:
A sketch of the Battle of Peachtree Creek, July 20, 1864.

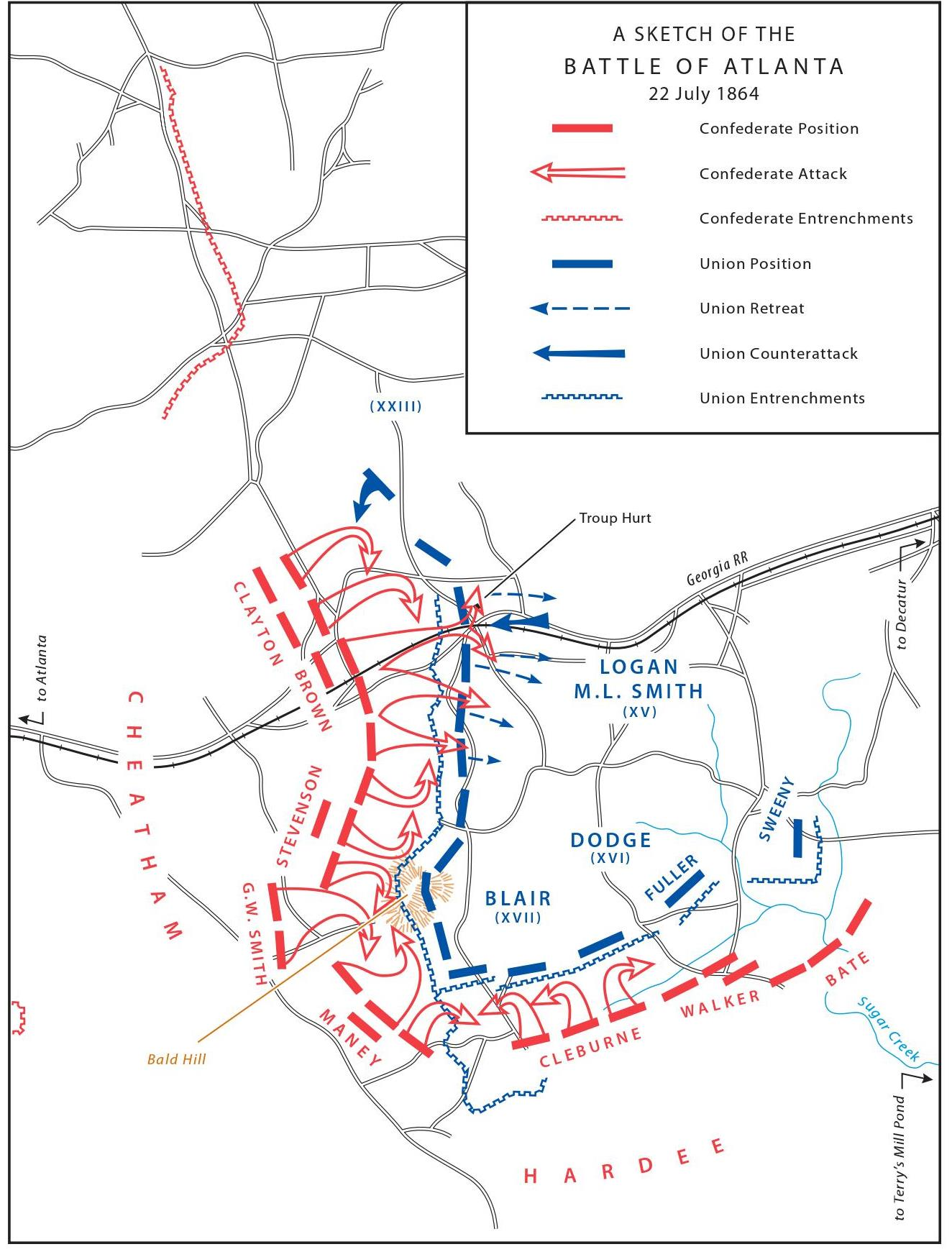
Map 3:
A sketch of the Battle of Atlanta, July 22, 1864.

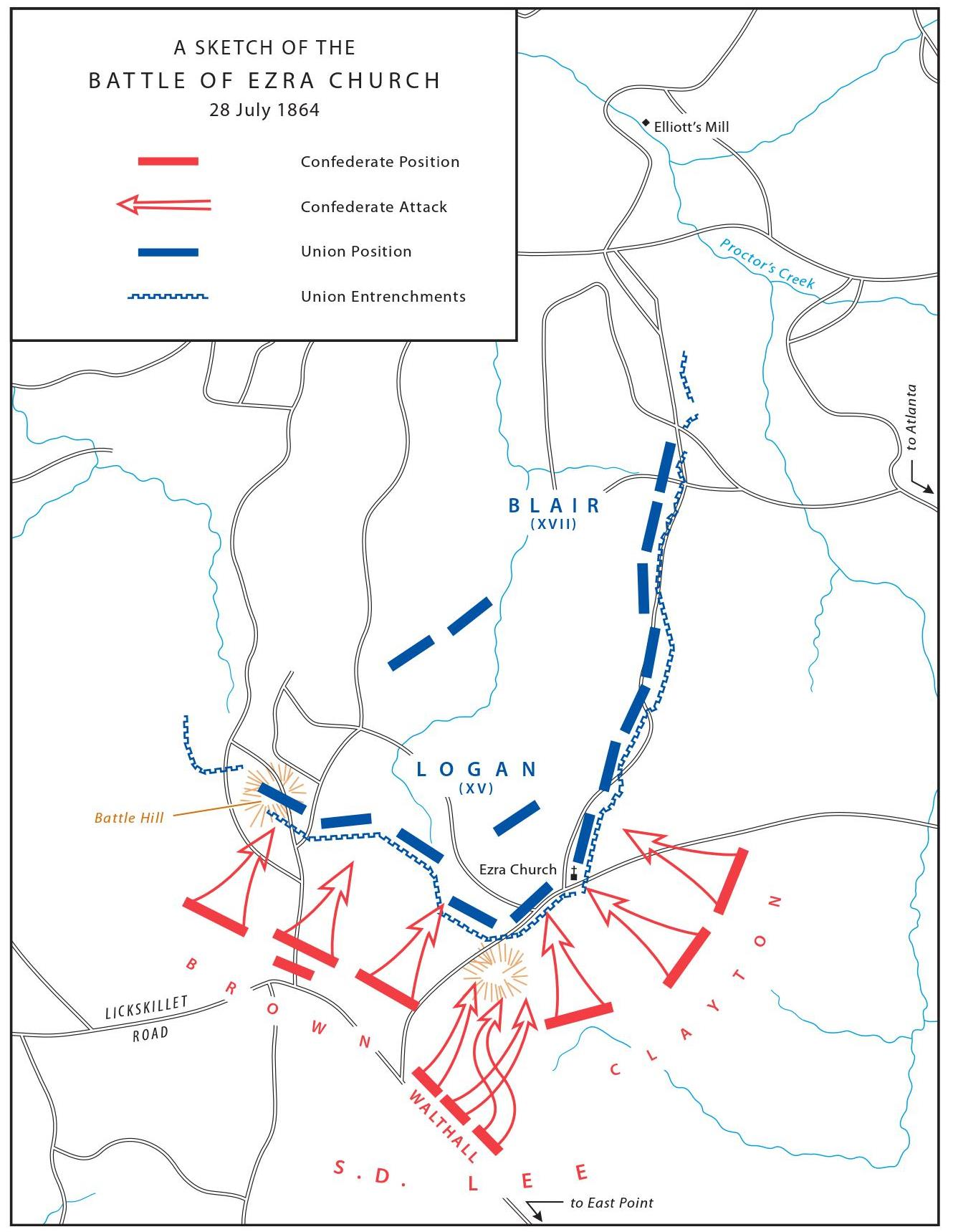
Maps 4-5:
A sketch of the Battle of Ezra Church, July 28, 1864.

== See also ==
- List of costliest American Civil War land battles
- Troop engagements of the American Civil War, 1864
