= James B. Steedman =

American politician

James Blair Steedman
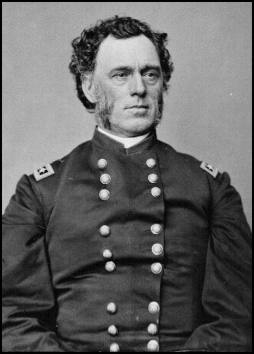
- Born: July 29, 1817; Northumberland County, Pennsylvania
- Died: October 18, 1883 (aged 66); Toledo, Ohio
- Burial place: Woodlawn Cemetery, Toledo, Ohio
- Military career
- Allegiance: Republic of Texas; United States of America
- Branch: Texian Army; United States Army
- Service years: 1835 (Texas Army); 1861–1866 (U.S.)
- Rank: Major general (U.S.)
- Nickname: Steady
- Commands: 14th Ohio Infantry
- Conflicts: Texas War of Independence; American Civil War: Battle of Rich Mountain; Battle of Mill Springs; Siege of Corinth; Battle of Perryville; Battle of Chickamauga; Second Battle of Dalton; Battle of Nashville
- Other work: Ohio legislator, printer, Toledo Police Chief

James Blair Steedman (July 29, 1817 – October 18, 1883) was an American printer, contractor and lawyer who rose to the rank of general in the Union Army during the Civil War. A printer by trade, as well as a soldier during the Texas War of Independence, Steedman returned to Ohio and later became a delegate in the state's General Assembly as well as President of Public Works, although he lost his campaign to become a U.S. Congressman.

Steedman raised a ninety-day regiment that participated in the early fighting at Battle of Philippi in western Virginia in June 1861. Posted to the Western theater and promoted to brigadier general under Major General Don Carlos Buell, Steedman was credited with saving a whole division from being routed at the Battle of Perryville (Kentucky). At the desperate Battle of Chickamauga (Georgia), he lent valuable support to General George Thomas, and won praise for saving the remaining Union forces after their defeat. He reunited with Thomas at Nashville (December 1864), taking heavy losses at first, but played a big part in the dramatic victory that ended the war in the west.

== Early and family life ==
Steedman was born in Northumberland County, Pennsylvania, in the summer of 1817, the second out of five children. He received no formal education while growing up.

== Printer, soldier, contractor and lawyer and Ohio politician ==
When Steedman was fifteen years old, both of his parents died, so to support his siblings he worked as a typesetter for the Lewisburg Democrat newspaper in Lewisburg. Two years later he moved down the Ohio River to Louisville, Kentucky, and found work there again as a typesetter for the Louisville Journal. He worked as a printer until joining the Texas Army of Sam Houston in 1835. After fighting in the Texas War of Independence, Steedman returned home to Pennsylvania, where he worked on a public works project as a supervisor. In 1835 Steedman moved to Ohio, desiring to become a public works contractor in his own right, but securing contracts proved difficult. Steedman decided to return to his newspaper roots and bought a printing press in the city of Napoleon in Henry County, Ohio, where he began publishing the Northwest Democrat newspaper in 1838. Also during this time he married Miranda Slides, and eventually contracts for public works began to come in. Steedman prospered as a contractor, his firm building early sections of both the Wabash and Erie Canal and the Toledo, Wabash and Western Railway.

Steedman began his career in politics in 1847, twice winning election to the Ohio General Assembly. Afterwards he worked as a railroad conductor and then went to make his fortune in the California Gold Rush in 1849. However, prospecting for gold proved difficult so in 1850, Steedman returned to Ohio. He was appointed to the state's board for public works, served from 1852 to 1857 (as the president three out of those four years). Also during that time, he was admitted to the state's bar association and then established a law practice in Toledo. Steedman became an editor of the North-Western Democrat and Toledo Times newspaper and a major general of the 5th Division in the Ohio State Militia in 1857, holding both positions until the beginning of the American Civil War in 1861. From 1856 to 1860, he also worked as a printer for the United States Congress.

In 1860, Steedman was part of Ohio's delegation to the Democratic National Convention when it met in Charleston, South Carolina, and again was an active supporter of Stephen Douglas in Baltimore, Maryland. Also in 1860, Steedman campaigned unsuccessfully for election to the U.S. House of Representatives for the district of Toledo.

== Civil War service ==
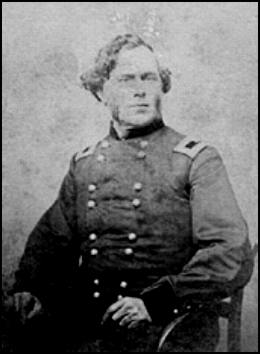
Steedman as a brigadier general

At the start of the American Civil War in 1861, Steedman chose to follow the Union cause and volunteered in the United States Army. He raised and was elected colonel of the 14th Ohio Infantry Regiment on April 27. The 14th Ohio was initially a ninety-day unit, but was re-organized that fall by Steedman when their enlistments were up. Steedman was mustered out of the volunteer service on August 13, and was appointed a regular army colonel of the 14th Ohio on September 1, shortly after the regiment re-enlisted for three years. Steedman and the 14th first saw action in June during the Union victory at the Battle of Philippi in Barbour County, Virginia (now part of West Virginia.)

Steedman and his regiment were then sent to serve in the Western Theater. They took part in Union victory during the Battle of Mill Springs near modern-day Nancy, Kentucky, in January 1862. The 14th Ohio also participated in the Siege of Corinth at Corinth, Mississippi, in late April and early June. Steedman was promoted to the rank of brigadier general on July 17, 1862, and given brigade command in the Army of the Ohio.

Following the Union victory at the Battle of Shiloh in April 1862, Steedman and his brigade were sent to join Maj. Gen. Don Carlos Buell's army in Kentucky that fall. During the Battle of Perryville on October 8, his brigade reinforced Brig. Gen. Rousseau's division, timely filling a gap in the Union line and saving the division from being pushed from the field. Steedman would receive a high commendation from Buell in his official report of the battle.

Steedman and his brigade fought during the Battle of Stones River in December 1862 and into January 1863, with his command a part of Brig. Gen. Speed S. Fry's division of the renamed Army of the Cumberland, now under the command of Maj. Gen. William S. Rosecrans

=== Chickamauga ===
Attacks at Chickamauga on September 20, 1863

During the Battle of Chickamauga in Georgia in the fall of 1863, Steedman led the vanguard of Union Maj. Gen. Gordon Granger's Reserve Corps to Maj. Gen. George Henry Thomas' aid on September 20. From his position north of the battlefield at MacAfee's Church, Granger heard the sounds of the fight to the south. Without orders from Rosecrans, Granger sent Steedman's division to support Thomas' last-ditch defensive effort as the rest of Rosecrans' defeated army raced for Chattanooga, Tennessee.

Steedman moved quickly and arrived about 2:30 p.m., just in time to stop Confederate Lt. Gen. James Longstreet's attempt to turn Thomas's right. Steedman is credited with "performing the most conspicuous act of personal courage recorded by any army officer during the Battle of Chickamauga" and preventing Rosecrans' defeat turning into a Union "disaster." Military historian Ezra J. Warner stated that "His heroism was virtually the salvation of the Union forces left on the field" at Chickamauga. During the fight, Steedman was wounded when his horse was shot and killed under him.

In late 1863, Steedman participated in the Siege of Chattanooga, as well as the Third Battle of Chattanooga from November 23–25. He remained in Chattanooga, commanding all forces there until May 1864, during which he was promoted to the rank of major general on April 20. Steedman also participated in much of the Atlanta campaign, and then commanded the District of Etowah in the Department of the Cumberland from June 15 to November 29, and again from January 5, 1865.

=== Nashville ===
Attacks at Nashville on December 16, 1864

In between his stints of district command, Steedman fought with Thomas' army during the Battle of Nashville on December 15–16, 1864. At Nashville Steedman led a "provisional" division consisting of 11 regiments on the Union left. He had arrived over two days from Chattanooga by rail with about 6,000 men, a collection of his own brigade plus men returning from furlough but belonging to other units. Steedman would be the only non-West Point graduate of Thomas' six chief commanders at Nashville.

A few days before the battle, Thomas found a telegram addressed to Ulysses S. Grant, now commander of all U.S. Army forces, written by Maj. Gen. John Schofield, one of his subordinates. In it Schofield complained of Thomas' slowness at attacking the Army of Tennessee, something Grant had prodded Thomas about repeatedly. Thomas turned to Steedman, who was with him at the time, and asked "Steedman, can it be possible that Schofield would send such a telegram?" to which he replied the commanding general must be able to recognize Schofield's handwriting. Thomas admitted he could and asked "Why does he send such telegrams?" Steedman smiled at his commander's innocence and replied "General Thomas, who is next in command to you in case of removal?" referring to Schofield. After a brief pause Thomas let out a quiet "Oh, I see."

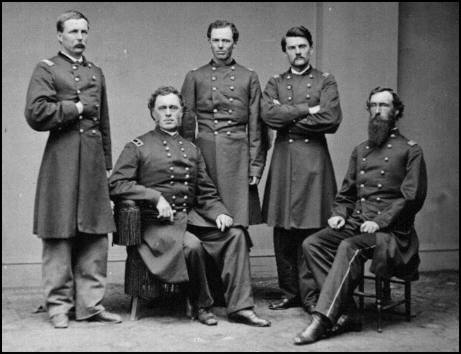
Steedman (seated, left) and his staff

Thomas ordered Steedman and his three-brigade division to make a diversionary attack at 6 a.m. on December 15, thereby keeping the Confederate Army of Tennessee's right (the corps of Maj. Gen. Benjamin F. Cheatham) occupied all day and preventing them from aiding against the main assault elsewhere. The orders were later modified to say if his diversion could be made into a successful attack, then Steedman should do so. On December 16, Thomas ordered an attack by the corps of Maj. Gen. Thomas J. Wood (along with Steedman's men) against the right of the Army of Tennessee, now held by Maj. Gen. Stephen D. Lee's corps. At noon the attack was begun, but initially was without success. Steedman's men took heavy losses in the first assaults this day, including one of his regiments, the 13th USCT Infantry, losing 221 men, the most of any regiment that day, Union or Confederate. When the rest of Thomas' force finally broke through Cheatham's men on the left as well as the Confederate center at 4 p.m., Wood and Steedman renewed their attack and helped the rest of Thomas' army overwhelm Lee's corps, driving it from the field.

After the Battle of Nashville, Steedman returned to Etowah until he was given command of the Department of Georgia, an assignment lasting from June 27 to December 10, 1865. He remained in the Army after the end of the American Civil War until resigning on August 18, 1866.

== Postbellum ==
After resigning his commission from the U.S. Army, Steedman returned home to Ohio in 1866. During the administration of U.S. President Andrew Johnson, he was the collector of internal revenue at New Orleans, Louisiana, until 1869. He again returned to Toledo, became the editor of the town's Northern Ohio Democrat newspaper, and in 1870 he was elected to the Ohio State Senate. He was a member of The Boston Club of New Orleans.

In May 1883 he was appointed the Chief of Police in Toledo, a post he held until his death.

== Death and legacy ==
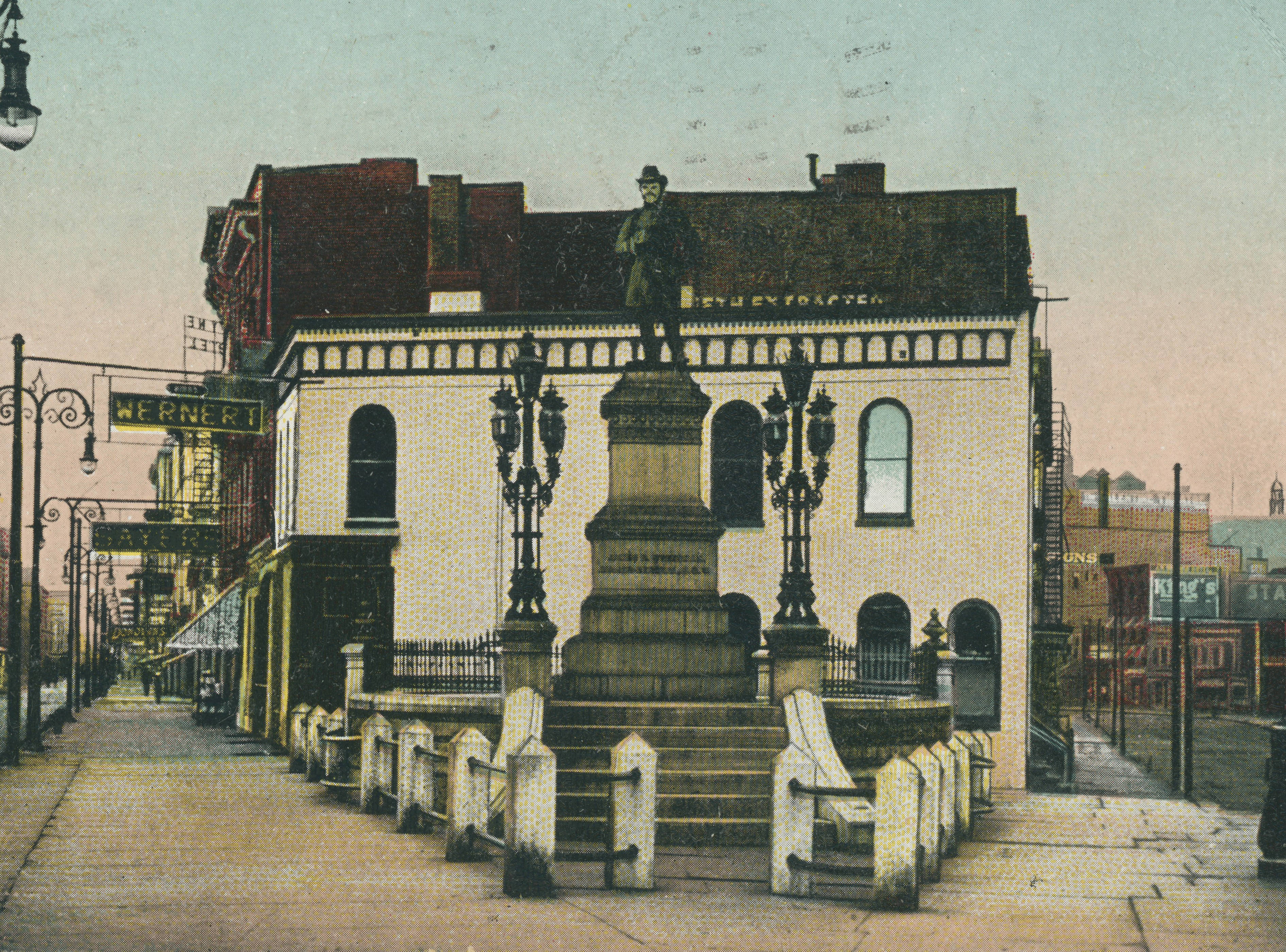
Monument to James B. Steedman in Toledo, Ohio

Steedman died in Toledo in 1883, and is buried there in Woodlawn Cemetery.

The monument now resides at Jamie Farr Park in Toledo on the banks of the Maumee River.

== See also ==
- List of American Civil War generals (Union)
