= Bernard Laiboldt =

American military officer (c.1827–?)

- Born: c. 1827; Grand Duchy of Baden
- Burial place: St. Louis, Missouri
- Military career
- Allegiance: (United States) Union; Missouri
- Branch: Union Army
- Service years: 1861–1864
- Rank: Colonel
- Commands: 2nd Missouri Infantry Regiment; 2nd Bde, 5th Div, Army of the Mississippi; 35th Bde, 11th Div, Army of the Ohio; 2nd Bde, 3rd Div, XX Corps, Army of the Cumberland
- Conflicts: Mexican–American War; American Civil War; Battle of Pea Ridge (1862); Siege of Corinth (1862); Battle of Perryville (1862); Battle of Stones River (1862–63); Tullahoma Campaign (1863); Battle of Chickamauga (1863); Battle of Missionary Ridge (1863); Skirmish at Calhoun, Tenn. (1863); Battle of Rocky Face Ridge (1864); Second Battle of Dalton (1864)
- Other work: St. Louis Police Commissioner, 1865–66

Bernard Laiboldt or Bernard Laibold (b. c. 1827) commanded the 2nd Missouri Infantry Regiment in the Union Army during the American Civil War. Born in Germany, Laiboldt came to the United States with his family as a child. He joined a Missouri infantry unit during the Mexican–American War. At the start of the Civil War, he became lieutenant colonel of the 2nd Missouri and led the regiment at Pea Ridge. He commanded a brigade at the Siege of Corinth and the Battle of Perryville. He assumed command after the brigade commander was killed at Stones River and led the brigade at Chickamauga. He led the 2nd Missouri at Missionary Ridge, Calhoun, Rocky Face Ridge, and Dalton. He was never promoted to brigadier general and he left the army in December 1864. He was St. Louis Police Commissioner in 1865–66 and later County Marshal.

== Early career ==
Laiboldt was born in the Grand Duchy of Baden in 1827. When he was six years old, his family emigrated to St. Louis, Missouri where many other Germans also settled. In 1846, he volunteered to fight in the Mexican-American War, first serving in Company F of the 1st Missouri St. Louis Legion. He then transferred to the 3rd Missouri Santa Fe Infantry. In 1852, he enrolled in the Missouri Riflemen Militia Company at St. Louis and became its captain. The militiamen presented Laiboldt with a custom sword and scabbard, of which the scabbard survives in the Missouri Civil War Museum.

== Civil War ==
=== 1863–1864 ===
At the start of the Atlanta campaign, Laiboldt commanded the 2nd Missouri which was assigned to Francis T. Sherman's 1st Brigade, John Newton's 2nd Division, Oliver Otis Howard's IV Corps. However, the regiment was detached at Dalton, Georgia on May 14, 1864. On August 14, the garrison of Dalton was summoned to surrender by Joseph Wheeler's cavalry. Laiboldt replied, "I have been placed here to defend this post, but not to surrender". After two hours of skirmishing, Wheeler's Confederates drove Laiboldt's skirmishers within the fortifications, which were atop a hill east of the railroad depot. Wheeler's troops attacked and were repulsed. Afterward, the Confederate general sent a flag of truce. This soldier was warned that he would be fired on if he approached again and skirmishing continued. Wheeler deployed two artillery pieces and shelled the Union positions at 8 pm and again between 11 pm and midnight. Wheeler retreated at 5 am the following day. In the Second Battle of Dalton, Laiboldt commanded 288 fit men and 94 convalescents from the 2nd Missouri, 52 troopers from the 7th Regiment Kentucky Volunteer Cavalry, 30 wagon drivers, and 20 scouts. Casualties numbered five killed, 12 wounded, and 23 captured. The 2nd Missouri was mustered out of service on September 27–29, 1864. Laiboldt was relieved of duty on December 8, 1864.
