= Second Battle of Dalton =

Battle of the American Civil War

Coordinates: 34.7889°N 84.9807°W

Battle of Dalton
- Part of the American Civil War
Date	August 14, 1864 – August 15, 1864
Location	Whitfield County, Georgia
Result	Union victory

Belligerents
United States (Union)	(Confederate States of America) CSA (Confederacy)

Commanders and leaders
James B. Steedman; Bernard Laiboldt	Joseph Wheeler

Units involved
District of Etowah	Wheeler's Cavalry Corps

Strength
800	5,000

Casualties and losses
40 killed 55 wounded	150 killed

The Second Battle of Dalton was fought August 14–15, 1864, between Union and Confederate forces in Whitfield County northern Georgia.

== Battle ==
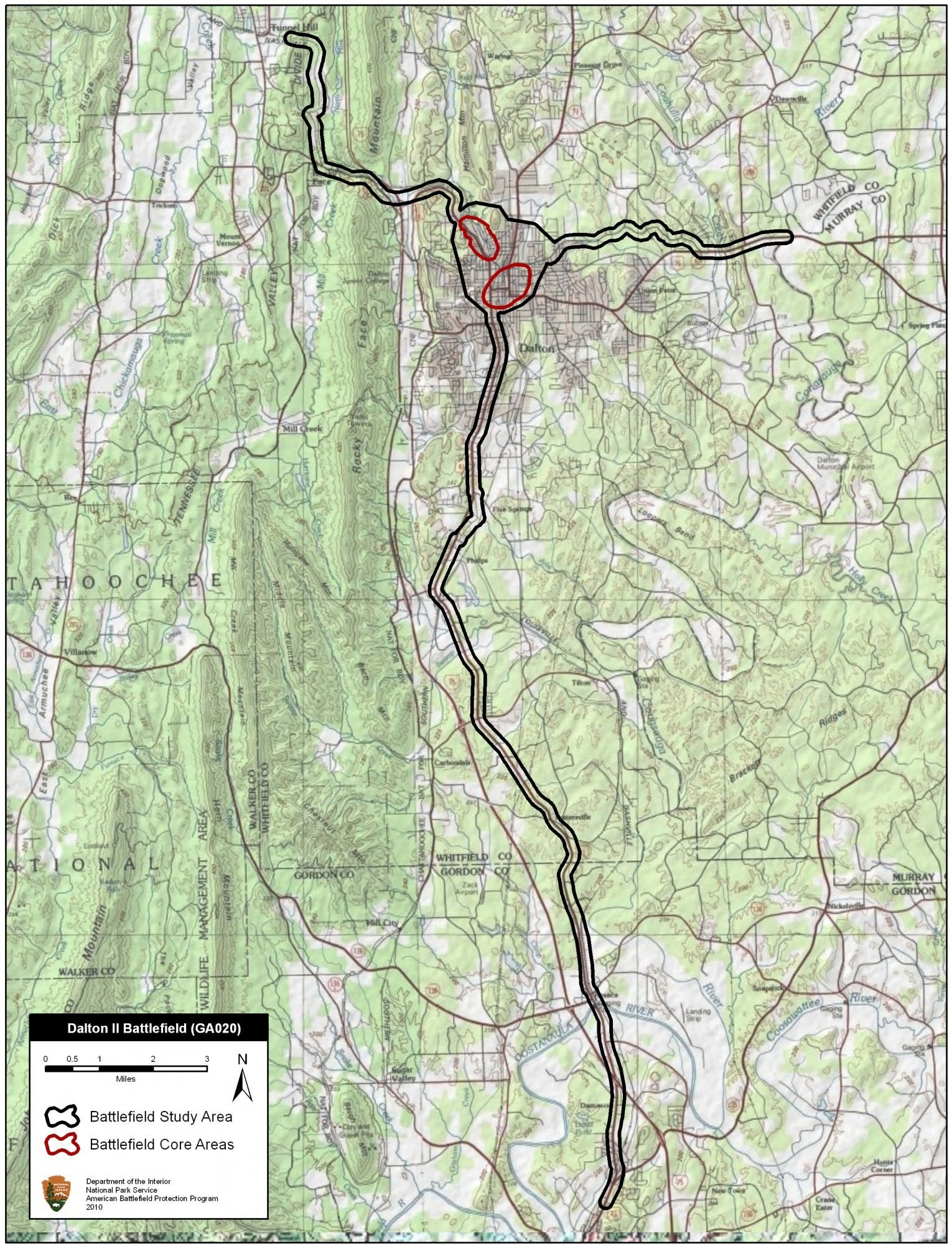
Map of Dalton II Battlefield core and study areas by the American Battlefield Protection Program.

Confederate cavalry, commanded by Maj. Gen. Joseph Wheeler raided northern Georgia to disrupt William T. Sherman's supply lines and destroy the railroad track, hoping to force Sherman to retreat from the state. On August 14, Wheeler demanded the surrender of the Union garrison at Dalton, Georgia, commanded by Colonel Bernard Laiboldt. Laiboldt refused and held out inside his fortifications, though sporadic fighting continued until midnight.

The next morning, Wheeler ended his attack and prepared to retreat. Union reinforcements arrived from Chattanooga, commanded by Maj. Gen. James B. Steedman, and engaged Wheeler's cavalry. Skirmishing continued for four hours, before the Confederates finally left the field.

The amount of damage inflicted by Wheeler on the railroad is debatable. However, Maj. Gen. George H. Thomas in Nashville reported that the track south of Dalton was quickly repaired and trains were running again within two days.

== Battlefield Condition ==
The growth of the City of Dalton has destroyed the battlefield landscape and its historic setting.
