= Edward Jardine =

- Born: November 2, 1828; Brooklyn, New York, U.S.
- Died: July 16, 1893 (aged 64); New York City, New York, U.S.
- Burial place: Green-Wood Cemetery, Brooklyn, New York, U.S.
- Military career
- Allegiance: United States of America; Union
- Branch: (United States) Union Army
- Service years: 1861–1865
- Rank: Colonel; Brevet Brigadier General
- Unit: 9th New York Infantry Regiment
- Commands: (New York (state)) 17th New York Infantry (New York (state)) 89th New York Infantry
- Conflicts: American Civil War; New York Draft Riots
- Other work: Civil servant, newspaper editor and publisher

Edward Jardine (November 2, 1828 – July 16, 1893) was an American U.S. Army officer during the American Civil War serving with the 9th New York Volunteer Infantry Regiment under General Benjamin Butler and later the Army of the Potomac under General Ambrose Burnside in Virginia and North Carolina campaigns. He was one of the senior military officers during the New York Draft Riots and narrowly escaped lynching at the hands of a mob. The injuries he sustained during the riots ended his military career.

== Biography ==
=== Early life and military service ===
Edward Jardine was born in Brooklyn to Charles Jardine, an Englishman of French descent, shortly after his parents arrived in the United States. He came from a poor background and, as a teenager, he worked at a hardware store and attended night school. At age 18, Jardine married Ophelia Kreemer with whom he had two sons, Augustus E. and James R. D. Jardine. Jardine eventually became a successful hardware importer and served in the State National Guard prior to the start of the American Civil War.

Enlisting in the Union Army in May 1861, he received a commission as an officer with the 9th New York Volunteer Infantry Regiment, popularly known as Hawkins' Zouaves, and later the IX Army Corps where he served under General Benjamin Butler at the Battle of Big Bethel and Hatteras Inlet expedition. In 1862, he accompanied the Army of the Potomac in General Ambrose Burnside's Roanoke expedition and took part in the Battles of Hatteras Inlet, Roanoke Island, South Mountain, Antietam and Fredericksburg. Twice wounded during the campaign, Jardine was promoted to the rank of major for "gallant conduct" and briefly commanded the 89th New York Infantry Regiment.

=== New York Draft Riots ===
After his unit had been disbanded in early 1863, the two-year enlistment terms having expired, he and other former Union officers were in New York to recruit new members. At the time the New York Draft Riots broke out, Jardine held no formal command. He did, however, call upon former members of Hawkins' Zouaves as well as other regiments to help local officials to defend against the rioters. Only 200 or so men responded his plea, but Jardine took command of the small force and prepared to face the rioters. A veteran artillery officer, he also gave artillery support to several regiments.

On July 15, Jardine and his men engaged the rioters at First Avenue and Nineteenth Street supporting Major Robinson and the Duryea's Zouaves with artillery fire from two howitzers. While the infantrymen engaged the rioters, Jardine ordered the guns to sweep the avenue but the mob scattered from the street by the time he gave the order to fire. Within a few minutes, they began taking fire from both sides of the street. Both artillery and sharpshooters returned fire, neither being effective. Despite being vastly outnumbered, he and his men attempted to disperse the mob but were instead pushed back leaving many soldiers dead and wounded on the streets before being forced to retreat. It was during this battle that Jardine was struck in the thigh by a piece of lead pipe fired from a cannon, which caused a compound fracture, an injury from which he never fully recovered.

He was rescued by local residents, two young women, who hid him and two others in the basement of their Second Avenue home. By the time the mob began searching homes and buildings for wounded soldiers, the two Duryea officers having escaped hours before, Jardine was able to escape notice by wearing civilian clothes. A second version claims that, upon the mob breaking into the house, the two officers were clubbed to death and that only the intervention of one of the rioters, a veteran of Hawkins' Zouaves, had recognized him that he persuaded the others to spare him. Jardine was taken to the home of a nearby surgeon where he remained for the rest of the riots.

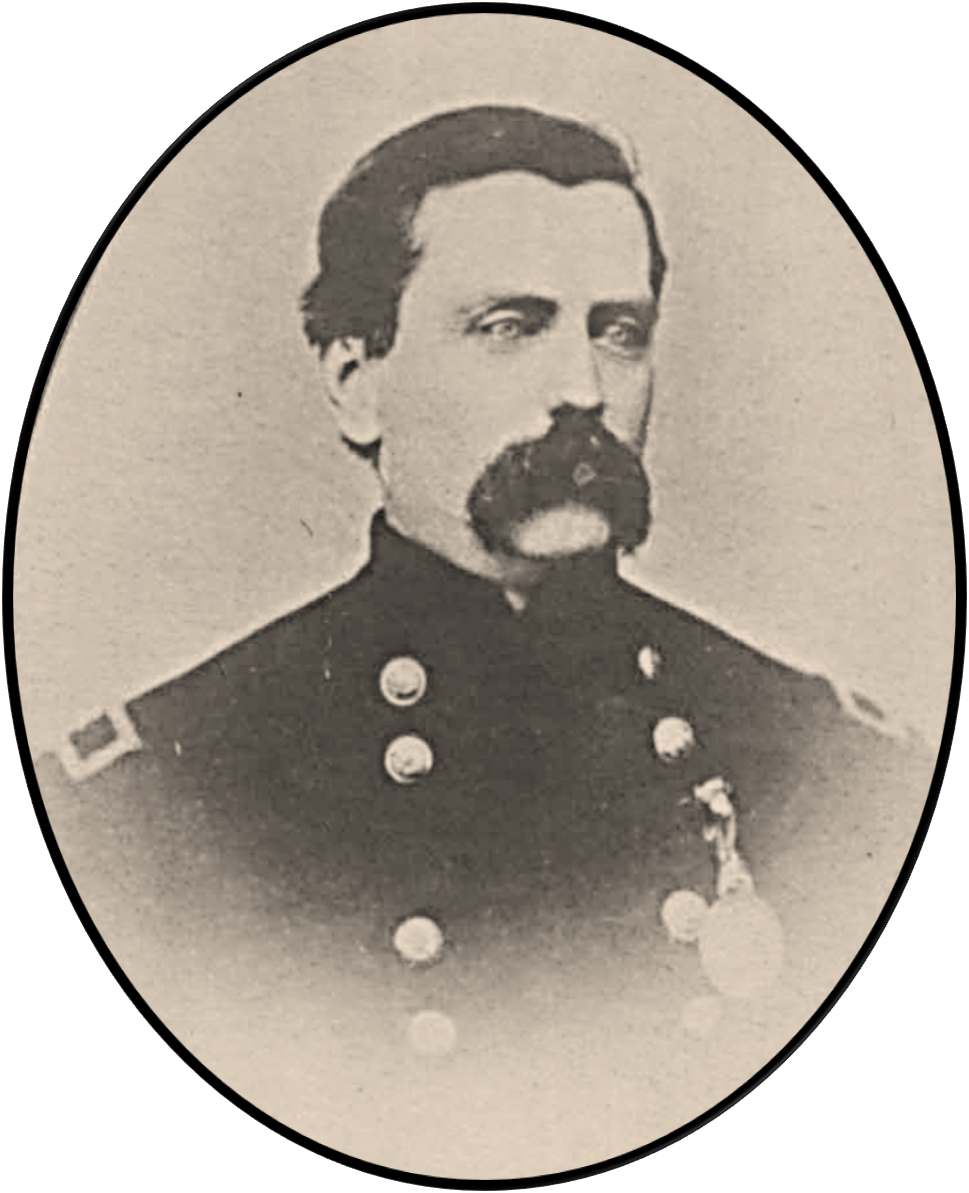
Brevet Brigadier General Edward Jardine, U.S. Volunteers, ca. 1866.

=== Retirement and later years ===
As a result of the draft riots, recruiting for the re-organizing veteran regiments in New York City dwindled rapidly; and in October 1863 the Governor of New York issued an order calling for the consolidation of those regiments then organizing in New York City. On October 14, 1863, the 9th, 11th, 17th & 38th New York Veteran Volunteer Infantry Regiments were consolidated together to create the 17th New York Veteran Volunteer Infantry Regiment. The 17th Veterans had the largest number of recruited members, with the 9th Veterans having the second most, as such William T.C. Grower, of the 17th, was appointed Colonel, and Edward Jardine as Lieutenant Colonel of the new regiment, which was mustered into United States service on October 14, 1863. Still recovering from his injuries sustained in the draft riots he served with the regiment as much as able, however, on May 10, 1864, he resigned his commission with the regiment to accept an appointment in the Veteran Reserve Corps. His appointment as Captain of the 4th Company of the 2nd Battalion, Veteran Reserve Corps, dated from May 3, 1864, and he served with them for the remainder of the war. On November 2, 1865, he was brevetted to the rank of Brigadier General of United States Volunteers for "“gallant and meritorious services during the War of the Rebellion.” His military service came to its end on April 12, 1866, when he resigned his commission and returned home to New Jersey.

He was briefly involved in business interests on Wall Street with W.T. Pelton, nephew of noted political reformer Samuel J. Tilden, but left New York for New Jersey where he settled in Fort Lee along the Hudson River. From 1867 to 1869, he was editor and publisher for the Daily Times in Jersey City. He was also active in local politics and ran for public office several times before becoming a clerk for the New Jersey state legislature in 1869. Involved in the Grand Army of the Republic, Jardine was elected provincial commander of its New Jersey chapter and, years later, became the commander of its New York chapter as well as its senior vice commander in chief.

During the next year, Jardine was personally appointed as a weigher to the New York U.S. Custom House by President Ulysses S. Grant. He remained in this position for almost twenty years until poor health, due to his old injuries, forced him to retire. After several years as a widower, he married Katherine Clark in 1885. His health continued to decline and was bedridden for much of 1887.

== Death ==
In March 1888, Jardine suffered an attack which caused him to be confined in the Hotel Pomeroy until his death in 1893. Funeral services were held at the Scottish Rite Hall at Madison Avenue and Twenty-Ninth Street the following afternoon. Reverend Clark Wright delivered the eulogy and members of the Chancellor Walworth Lodge of Masons, the George Washington Post of the Grand Army and Loyal Legion of Honor were in attendance.
