= 20th United States Colored Infantry Regiment =

American Civil War military unit

20th United States Colored Infantry
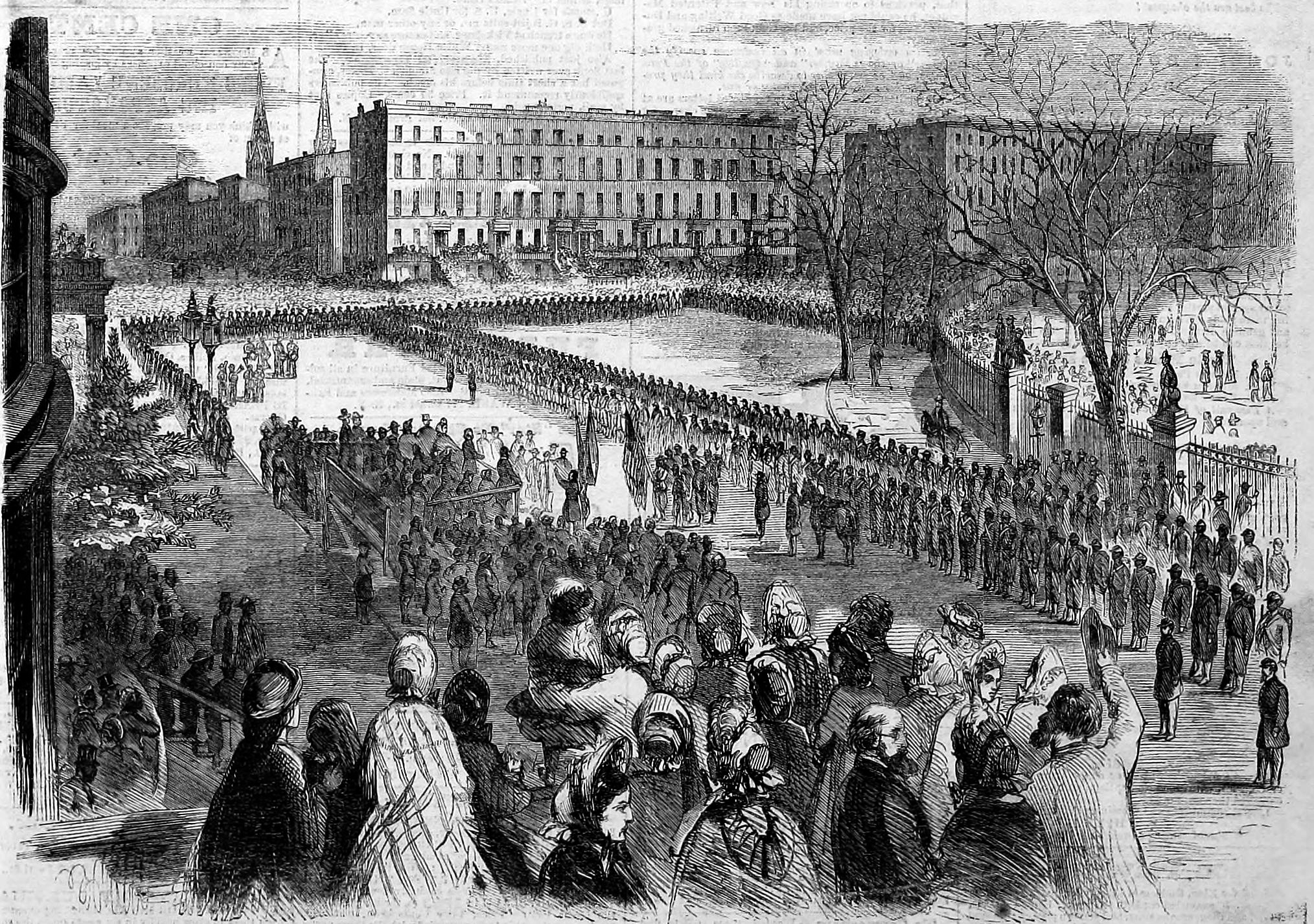
- Etching of the Twentieth United States colored troops receiving their colors on Union Square, March 5, 1864
- Active: February 9, 1864 - October 7, 1865
- Country: United States
- Allegiance: Union
- Branch: Infantry

The 20th United States Colored Infantry was an infantry regiment that served in the Union Army during the American Civil War. The regiment was composed of African American enlisted men from New York commanded by white officers and served in the Department of the Gulf from the spring of 1864 until the end of the war.

== Service ==
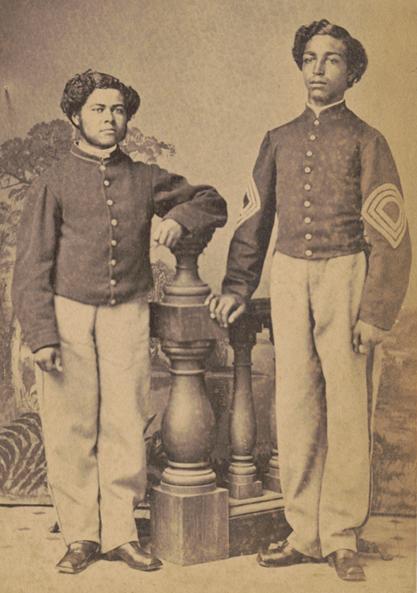
Sergeant Major William L. Henderson and Hospital Steward Thomas H.S. Pennington of the 20th US Colored Infantry, photographed in New Orleans.

The 20th U.S. Colored Infantry was organized at Rikers Island, New York on February 9, 1864 for three-years' service. The creation of the regiment was initiated by the New York City Union League Club, a group of wealthy businessmen who supported the policies of President Abraham Lincoln. The Union League petitioned the War Department for permission to recruit a regiment, and selected Nelson B. Bartram, a veteran officer of the 17th New York Infantry and 8th Colored Infantry as the new regiment's commander.

On March 5, 1864, the regiment paraded across Manhattan to Union Square, where it was presented with a regimental flag by the Union League, then departed by ship to New Orleans.

From New Orleans, the regiment was sent to Port Hudson, Louisiana, which served as an important garrison and operational base for Union troops in the region. Briefly dispatched to Point Cavalho, Texas, the regiment then returned to New Orleans. For the remainder of the war, the 20th Colored Infantry guarded the defenses of New Orleans, with short-term postings at West Pascagoula, Florida and Nashville, Tennessee after the end of the war. The regiment was mustered out of service on October 7, 1865.

== Casualties ==
The regiment lost a total of 285 men during service; 2 officers and 283 enlisted men died of disease.

== Commanders ==
Commanding officers of the 20th US Colored Infantry Regiment:

- Colonel Nelson B. Bartram
- Lieutenant Colonel Andrew E. Mather

== See also ==
- List of United States Colored Troops Civil War Units
- United States Colored Troops
