= William Thomas Campbell Grower =

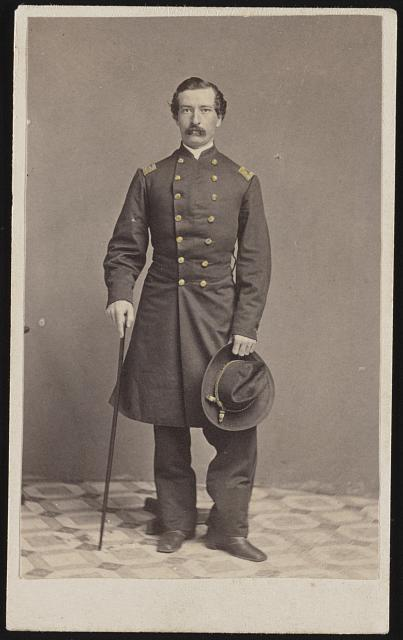
- Born: c. 1840; Leeds, England
- Died: 1864; Jonesboro, Georgia
- Burial place: Greenwood Cemetery, New York City, New York
- Military career
- Allegiance: United States of America; Union
- Branch: United States Army; Union Army
- Service years: 1861–1864
- Rank: Colonel
- Commands: 17th New York Veteran Volunteer Infantry
- Conflicts: American Civil War: Second Battle of Bull Run; Battle of Jonesboro †

William Thomas Campbell Grower was a United States Army Officer in the American Civil War, 1861 to 1865, and serving as the Major of the 17th New York Volunteer Infantry Regiment (1861–1863) and Colonel of the 17th New York Veteran Volunteer Infantry Regiment (1863–1865). He died after being fatally injured in the Battle of Jonesborough.

== Early life ==
William Thomas Campbell Grower was born in Leeds, England, ca. 1840, and at a young age came with his father, James Grower, to the United States, settling in New York City, New York. He received his early education in New York City, and was later employed as a Banker in that city. In 1857 William was married to Miss Sara E. Jones in New York City, and the couple had at least one child, William Frederick who was born on July 23, 1860.

== Military service, 1861 to 1863 ==
With the secession of South Carolina in December 1860, the remainder of the Southern states throughout 1861, and the calling up of Volunteers to serve in suppressing the Rebellion, William, with the help of other, organized Company D of the 17th New York Volunteer Infantry Regiment, "The Westchester Chasseurs," and was mustered into service as the captain of that company on May 20, 1861, at New York City, New York, for two years service. With the regiment he left New York on June 21, 1861, and moved via New Jersey, and Maryland, to Washington, D.C., arriving there on the 23rd. The regiment spent of the Winter of 1861–1862 in quarters at Hall's Hill, Virginia, a short distance from Washington, D.C., as part of the Brigadier General Daniel Butterfield's Brigade of the 3rd Division, 3rd Army Corps.

With the close of the winter, Captain Grower lead his company in a reconnaissance towards Manassas Junction, but stopped short at Fairfax Seminary, and then returned to Alexandria, Virginia, where it boarded transports that were to carry the regiment down to join the remainder of the Army of the Potomac near Hampton Roads, Virginia. From May to July, the regiment was engaged in the marches and movements of the Corps on the Peninsula of Virginia against Richmond, and took part in the Battle of Hanover Courthouse on May 27, 1862. During this campaign Captain Grower was promoted to major of the regiment on June 20, 1862, as a result of the promotion of Major N. B. Bartram to lieutenant colonel, his rank to take effect from May 10, 1862. Following the withdraw of the Army of the Potomac the regiment moved to Newport News in August, and then by steamer to Aquia Creek, an uneasy trip in which the first transport carrying them ran aground in the Potomac River, and the men had to transfer to a second steamer to complete their trip, and arriving at that place on the morning of the 20th. From Aquia Creek they moved up to through Fredericksburg, Rapidan, and Warrenton, to Manassas, arriving there early in the morning of the 30th.

The morning of August 30, 1862, found Major Grower commanding the regiment, as the Confederate forces began an advance the regiment was ordered forward against them, with the rest of the brigade. Major Grower lead the regiment forward through a severe fire, and after standing for a short time and suffering terrible losses the regiment was ordered to fall back when it was unable to be reinforced, they then marched off the field under a severe fire. In the fighting that day the regiment lost 13 officers and 250 enlisted men killed and wounded; among them was Major Grower, who had received four separate wounds and was placed out of action for over four months recovering from them.

After recovering sufficiently to rejoin the regiment, Major Grower returned in December 1862, finding them in Camp near Falmouth, Virginia. The regiment then moved to take part in the Battle of Fredericksburg, Virginia, in which it was only lightly engaged, sustaining 1 killed and 6 wounded, and then returned to camp, until January 1863 when it participated in the Mud March of the Army, and returned to its camp on the 24th, and remained there for the winter of 1862–63. In February 1863 Major Grower apparently submitted his resignation, as a result of the injuries he had sustained at Second Manassas; however, the resignation was revoked and he remained with the regiment throughout the remainder of its service.

In April 1863 the regiment left from its camp and commenced on its final campaign, the Chancellorsville Campaign. Moving along the Kelly's Ford Road it reached Hartwood Church on the 27th, and then from the 28th to 30th advanced and crossed the Rapidan River at Kelly's Ford, arriving in position on 1 May. On the 2nd it was engaged in constructing breastworks, and was only slightly engaged on the 3rd, and held its position on the 4th, and withdrew back across the United States Ford on the 5th. On the 6th the regiment arrived back in its Camp at Falmouth, but only remained there until the 18th when it departed for New York City, New York, preparatory to being mustered out of service. On the 22nd the regiment arrived in New York City, New York, and went into camp for a short time at that place. On June 2, 1863, the regiment was officially mustered out of United States service.

== Military service, 1863 to 1864 ==
On June 3, 1863, following the Mustering out of the regiment, Major Grower was appointed as a colonel and was authorized by the governor of New York to reorganize the regiment as the 17th New York Veteran Volunteer Infantry Regiment, and he set to work with several others of the old regiment on the organization of the Veteran Regiment. At the time of his appointment as colonel he was described as being 5 feet 10 inches tall, of a fair complexion, with dark eyes, and brown hair, and had listed his occupation as soldier. At the same time throughout New York City there were other two years regiments who had been mustered out of service reorganizing, among them were the 9th New York Veteran Volunteers (Hawkins Zouaves), the 11th New York Veteran Volunteers (Ellsworth's Zouaves), and the 38th New York Veteran Volunteers.

In July 1863 as a result of the draft, a riot took place in New York City in which the regiment, although not completed, was called out along with the other Volunteers in the city to help in suppressing. Following the Draft Riots the regiment continued its organization at Camp Sprague on Staten Island. From September to October 1863 the regiment was filled out when the Adjutant General of New York consolidated the men recruited for the 9th New York Veteran Volunteers on October 1 into the regiment as Companies H and I, the men of the 11th New York Veteran Volunteers on the same date as Companies D and E, the men of the 38th New York Veteran Volunteers as Company K on October 14, 1863, and finally several men recruited for a unit known as the Union Sharpshooters were merged into the regiment to complete the various companies. The regiment completed its organization and on October 17, 1863, William Grower was mustered into service as colonel of the regiment for three years service.

Leading the regiment, they moved from Camp Sprague for Washington, D.C., on October 21, arriving later the next day, and only remaining a short time. From October 28 to November 8 though the regiment moved from Louisville, Kentucky, Eastport, Mississippi, and then to Columbus, Kentucky, and finally arrived at Eastport, Tennessee, on November 7, 1863, where it would remain until December. On December 11, 1863, the regiment moved to Union City, Tennessee, and on the 21st left with the other Regiments of the brigade as part of Major General A.J. Smith's Expedition against Confederate forces of Nathan B. Forrest, and marches from the 21st to January 24, 1864, against there those forces, and arrived on the 24th at Vicksburg, Mississippi. The march during this time was an extremely difficult one as a result of the weather and the regiment is estimated to have suffered over 200 injuries as a result of the cold weather from frostbite.

Upon arrival in Vicksburg, the regiment was assigned to duty for five days as guards, and was also assigned to the 2nd Brigade, 4th Division, of the 16th Army Corps, and remained at Vicksburg until February. From February 3 to March 2 the regiment was serving with the 16th Corps in the march of the forces under Major General William T. Sherman to Meridian, Mississippi. At the conclusion of that campaign the regiment returned for a short time to Vicksburg, but in April 1864 was transferred to the 3rd Brigade of the 4th Division and was sent to Decatur, Alabama, where they would remain until August 4. During this time Colonel Grower found himself in command of the 3rd Brigade from May to July 1864, and lead them in the engagement of July 25, 1864, at Courtland, Alabama, as well as leading the regiment in several smaller skirmishes throughout their service at that place.

On August 4, 1864, the brigade, and the regiment, were ordered to join Major General William Sherman's Army near Atlanta, Georgia, and with them they took part in the Siege of Atlanta until August 25. On the 21st of that month Colonel Grower received orders for the regiment to join the 1st Brigade, 2nd Division, of the 14th Army Corps. During the siege of Atlanta in August 1864 Colonel Grower displayed his regular coolness in action and under fire, an example of this is given by First Sergeant William Westervelt of Company K of the regiment who wrote: "We remained until the afternoon of the 20th, and were continually under fire. No part of our position was safe. Our Major had put up a temporary shelter in the safest point he could fin, and one morning invited our Colonel to breakfast, telling him as an inducement that he could offer him some butter, which was almost an unknown article in the army at that time. Just as they seated themselves at the table, a ten pound shot came through the roof of their quarters, and cut off one corner of the table. Major Martin did what any ordinary man would do under the circumstances – he turned a back somersault off his camp stool and hugged the ground close, thinking it was a shell and would likely explode. Not so with Col. Grower. He coolly laid down his knife and fork, folded his hands, and leaning back on his stool, with an air of offended dignity remarked, "Major Martin, that is a great way to treat a man when invited to breakfast."

== Final campaign ==
On August 25 the 14th Corps began its flanking movement against the Confederate positions at Jonesboro, Georgia, which culminated in the Battle of Jonesborough, Georgia, on September 1, 1864. Around 3:00 a.m. on the 1st the regiment formed in line to the rear of the 10th Michigan, one mile north of the railroad at Jonesboro, and began its advance. The other regiments of the brigade moved forward and then toward the right, while the 17th Veteran's continued their advance straight ahead towards the Confederate positions, they came upon a ravine that was heavily strewn with brush and they quickly reformed on the opposite side of it. It was during this time that two other recruits that had been driven back were coming through their lines, and only through the efforts of Colonel Grower were the men steadied and kept moving forward. With the line reformed the regiment was formed on the left of the 60th Illinois Volunteer Infantry, and then continued its advance.

=== Wounding ===
It was at this point that Colonel Este's commanding the 3rd Brigade, 3rd Division came upon Colonel Grower and called upon him to advance to his support as his brigade was caught in a rather murderous fire and he feared that the line might break. Colonel Grower promptly moved the regiment forward to their support and put them in line. The regiment quickly gained its position and commenced returning the fire it had been receiving. It was during this time that Colonel Grower was severely wounded, and Major Joel O. Martin assumed command of the regiment. Colonel Grower instructed Major Martin to find out if the regiment was supported on the right or left, and that if not to, that he was to fall the regiment back and reform the lines. Major Martin soon found that there was no support to the regiment right or left, and as such fell the regiment back a short distance to a line of woods and reformed the line. The regiment then moved forward and formed on the left of the 10th Michigan, Lieutenant McAllister, an aide-de-camp, then found the regiment and ordered Major Martin to form them on the left of the 60th Illinois, which was located in a set of woods to the Regiments front, Major Martin moved the men forward but did not find the 60th Illinois, instead finding again Colonel Este's and the men of the 3rd Brigade, 3rd Division. The Major inquired as to the location of the brigade but the colonel was not certain and called upon Major Martin to come to his assistance as his own brigade was in somewhat of an exposed position. Colonel Este's directed the regiment to the left of his brigade, and they occupied the position for a short time, when an officer commanding one of the Brigades of the 1st Division came upon the regiment and asked for their assistance as he stated that his brigade was having its left flank turned and that if the regiment did not advance to relieve the pressure against them that they would be forced to fall back. Major Martin stated the "Advancing my right considerably, so as to have an enfilading fire upon the enemy in hi front, I moved forward as he directed, fired a volley, which was not replied to, and finding that there was no enemy in my front I moved back to the position which I had left." As they resumed their position Lieutenant McAllister found the regiment again and ordered them to rejoin the 60th Illinois, with this done the regiment entrenched for the night, and thus ended its part in the Battle of Jonesboro, after sustaining a loss of 24 Killed, 9 died of wounds, and 80 Wounded.

=== Death ===
Following his wounding Colonel Grower was removed from the field to a nearby hospital, where he remained until 11:00 a.m. on September 3, at which time he died of his wounds. The story of the Colonel's death was recorded in 1872 by John McElroy of the 16th Illinois Volunteer Cavalry Regiment in his book, Andersonville: A Story of Rebel Military Prisons. The account given by McElroy is as follows:

"Do you know," said another of the Fourteenth, "I heard our Surgeon telling about how that Colonel Grower, of the Seventeenth New York, who came in so splendidly on our left died! They say he was a Wall Street broker, before the war. He was hit shortly after he led his regiment in, and after the fight, was carried back to the Hospital. While our Surgeon was going the rounds Colonel Grower called him, and said quietly, 'When you get through with the men, come and see me, please.'

"The Doctor would have attended to him then, but Grower wouldn't let him. After he got through he went back to Grower, examined his wound, and told him that he could only live a few hours. Grower received the news tranquilly, had the Doctor write a letter to his wife, and gave him his things to send her, and then grasping the Doctor's hand, he said:

"Doctor, I've just one more favor to ask; will you grant it?"

"The Doctor said, 'Certainly; what is it?'

"You say I can't live but a few hours?"

"Yes, that is true."

"And that I will likely be in great pain?"

"I am sorry to say so."

"Well, then, do give me morphine enough to put me to sleep, so that I will wake up only in another world."

"The Doctor did so; Colonel Grower thanked him; wrung his hand, bade him good-by, and went to sleep to wake no more."

=== Burial ===
On September 19, 1864, Colonel Grower's remains arrived in New York City, New York, and were escorted by the 7th Regiment, New York National Guard, to New York City Hall, where they were laid in state for a short time, and then removed to Brooklyn City Hall. The Colonel's remains were escorted to their final resting place in Green-Wood Cemetery on September 21, 1864, by the 13th Brooklyn Regiment, New York National Guard, and it is there that the remains of the Gallant Colonel Grower of the 17th New York Veteran Volunteers are to be found.
