= 106th United States Colored Infantry Regiment =

Union Army infantry regiment

106th United States Colored Infantry Regiment 4th Alabama Volunteer Infantry Regiment (African Descent)
- Active: March 31, 1864 – November 7, 1865
- Country: United States
- Allegiance: Union
- Branch: Infantry
- Size: Regiment
- Garrison/HQ: Pulaski, Tennessee
- Engagements: American Civil War

The 106th United States Colored Infantry Regiment was an infantry regiment of the United States Colored Troops, formed during the American Civil War. It was organized as the 4th Alabama Volunteer Infantry Regiment (African Descent) in late March 1864, and redesignated as the 106th United States Colored Infantry in May. The regiment spent its service on garrison duty at Pulaski, Tennessee, guarding railroads. It was consolidated into the 40th United States Colored Infantry Regiment in November 1865.

== Service ==
Organized at Decatur, Alabama, and mustered in on March 31, 1864. The regiment was placed on garrison duty at Pulaski, Tennessee, to May, 1864. It was redesignated as the 106th United States Colored Infantry Regiment on May 16, 1864 when USCT units received federal designations.

The 106th continued serving with the District of North Alabama, part of the Department of the Cumberland, until February 1865, when it was transferred to the Defenses of Nashville and the Northwestern Railroad in the same department. For this period the regiment continued garrisoning Pulaski and guarding railroads. Between September 23 and 24, 1864, it fought against Nathan Bedford Forrest's attack on Athens, Alabama, which became known as the Battle of Sulphur Creek Trestle. After the end of the war, the regiment was consolidated into the 40th United States Colored Infantry Regiment on November 7, 1865.

== See also ==
- List of Alabama Union Civil War regiments
- List of United States Colored Troops Civil War units

== Bibliography ==
- Dyer, Frederick H. (1908). A Compendium of the War of the Rebellion. Des Moines, IA: Dyer Publishing Company.
- Dyer, Frederick H. (1959). A Compendium of the War of the Rebellion. Sagamore Press Inc. Thomas Yoseloff, Publisher, New York, New York. LCCN 59-12963.
