= Burning of Winton =

1862 battle of the American Civil War in North Carolina

- Part of the American Civil War
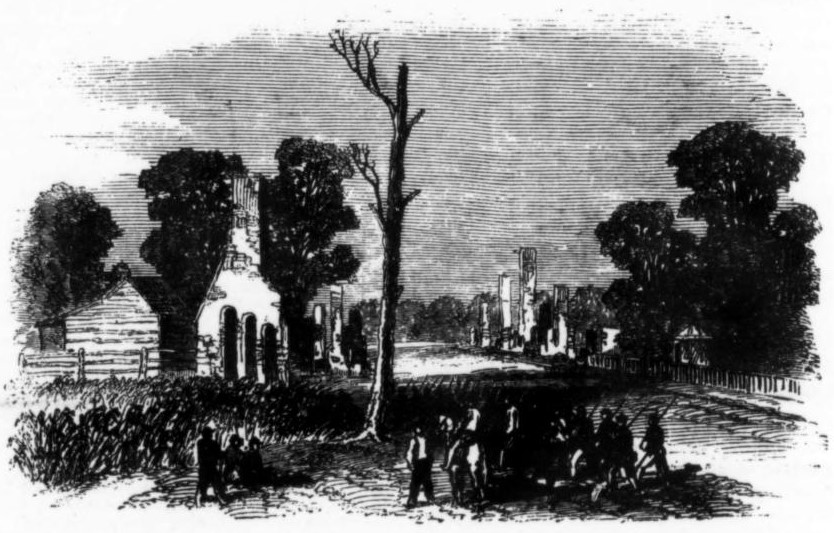
- Ruins of Winton in 1863
Date	February 19–20, 1862
Location	Winton, North Carolina, U.S.

Belligerents
United States	Confederate States

Commanders and leaders
(United States Navy) Stephen C. Rowan (United States) Rush Hawkins	(Confederate States of America) William T. Williams (Confederate States of America) J. N. Nichols

Strength
~1,000 soldiers 8 gunboats	700+ soldiers 4 artillery pieces

Casualties and losses
1 gunboat damaged	1 killed 2 wounded

During the American Civil War, a combined force of Union Army soldiers and U.S. Navy gunboats advanced into the town of Winton, North Carolina in February 1862 as a thrust of Burnside's North Carolina Expedition. After being initially repulsed due to an ambush by the Confederate States Army, the federal contingent returned and burned most of the buildings in the town.

== Background ==
In early February 1862, Union forces captured Roanoke Island. Within a few days, federal forces defeated a Confederate flotilla at Elizabeth City and captured the town of Edenton, thus opening up the region along the Chowan River to further penetration. Determining that the federal government did not intend for eastern North Carolina to become a major new front in the war, Confederate authorities offered only small contingents to reinforce the region. The First Battalion of North Carolina Volunteers under Lieutenant Colonel William T. Williams and Company A of the Virginia Mounted Artillery—equipped with four light guns—under Captain J. N. Nichols were dispatched from Virginia to the Chowan port of Winton to guard against any potential federal advance up the river towards Weldon or Norfolk.

Winton, the seat of government for Hertford County, was a small town comprising approximately 20 homes and fewer than 300 inhabitants. The Confederate forces occupied nearly every building in the town, including several stores, the county courthouse, and the county jail. Captain J. L. Frinsley, the First Battalion's quartermaster, hired local horses, mules, and wagons for the Confederates' use. Local militia units brought the total strength of Confederate forces in the town to over 700 soldiers. Colonel William J. Clarke, the area commandant headquartered in Murfreesboro, felt that the reinforcements were inadequate and requested that Confederate Secretary of War Judah P. Benjamin send more troops to no avail.

For the federals' part, General Burnside and Admiral Louis M. Goldsborough resolved to "sweep Albemarle Sound clean of defenses" before contemplating more serious action on the mainland. Pursuant to this plan, expeditions of gunboats laden with infantry were planned to attack Confederate strongholds in the region. On February 17, they proclaimed that, "the Northern people were Christians and would inflict no injury unless forced to do so."

== Action at Winton ==
=== February 19 ===
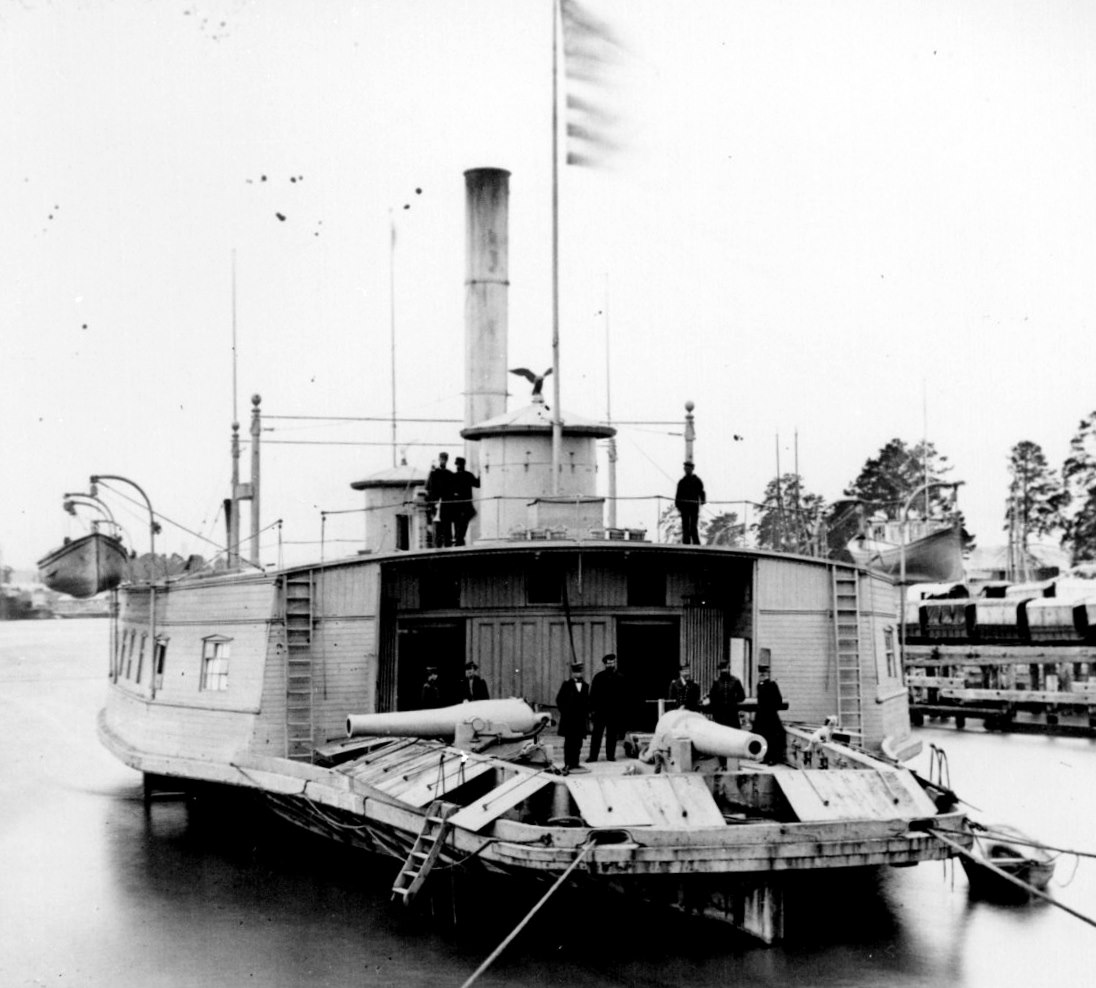
The USS Commodore Perry (pictured in 1864) was one of the Union gunboats in the flotilla which steamed to Winton.

A Union flotilla left anchor at Plymouth headed up the Chowan River for Winton on the morning of February 19. It comprised eight gunboats: the USS Deleware—which was in the lead, the Commodore Perry, the Louisiana, the Morse, the Hunchback, the Whitehead, the Commodore Barney, and the John L. Lockwood. The boats were armed with various artillery pieces, including howitzers, 32-pounder guns, and nine inch guns. Commodore Stephen Clegg Rowan commanded the vessels. Accompanying the convoy were the 9th New York Infantry Regiment—led by Colonel Rush Hawkins and popularly known as "Hawkins Zouaves"—and several companies of the 4th Rhode Island Infantry Regiment, totaling about 1,000 men. Hawkins had orders from General Burnside to investigate reports of Unionist activity in Winton and to proceed north to the Nottoway and Blackwater rivers and destroy bridges of the Seaboard and Roanoke Railroad.

Meanwhile, reports reached Winton that federal gunboats were steaming up the Chowan River towards the town. Williams and Nichols stationed their forces atop a 40-foot tall bluff in front of the town, concealed behind trees and brush. There, they hoped to lure Union vessels close to shore to make them vulnerable to attack. According to tradition, Williams supposedly hired a local mulatto woman, Martha Keen, to signal to the federals that it was safe to land as a ruse.

The federal flotilla passed the town of Colerain at about 14:00, finding its docks had been set ablaze by retreating Confederates. At about 16:00, the Delaware encroached upon Winton, and its crew went to the mess for supper. Several minutes later, the town's wharf was in view, and the Delaware's commanding officer, Lieutenant Quackenbush, ordered his boat to slow its speed and prepare to dock. Hawkins—having climbed atop the Delaware's crosstrees to serve as the expedition's lookout—and Rowan observed a colored woman waving them into the land with a piece of cloth. When the vessel was less than 50 yards from the shore, Hawkins noticed the Confederate forces massed atop the bluff and ordered the pilot to abort the landing and began to descend from the crosstrees as the Williams ordered the Confederates to open fire. The ratlines were severed by rifle fire as Hawkins climbed down, causing him to plummet onto the deck, though he escaped injury. The rest of the crew ran from the mess and took cover across the deck. Delaware sustained 185 musket shots but was not struck by any Confederate artillery.

Once clear from the Confederates' musket range, the Delaware opened fire upon the bluff, shortly followed by the trailing Commodore Perry. Nichols' horse was shot out under him by shrapnel. The Union bombardment wounded an additional horse and two men before the Confederates scattered for cover. The Delaware and Commodore Perry were able to withdraw with the only casualty being damage to the Delaware. Rowan signaled the rest of the flotilla to turn back. While steaming away from the town, the crew of the Perry spotted a Confederate scout with his horse on the banks of the river and fired upon him with artillery, obliterating both the man and his mount. The ships anchored several miles south of Winton. The federal officers conferenced aboard the Delaware and decided to return to Winton the following day prepared to fight. Meanwhile, the Confederates in Winton celebrated their victory.

=== February 20 ===
On the morning of February 20, the Union sailors prepared for their attack by bulletproofing their vessels, tying hammocks to the pilot houses and fortifying the bulwarks with mattresses and bags. Cutlasses and revolvers were stockpiled on the decks and packs of oakum and kindling were issued to the troops for burning buildings. The flotilla went underway at 8:00. Word quickly reached Winton of the impending assault and, Colonel Williams, doubtful that the Confederates could withstand a full-scale attack, withdrew his forces to breastworks at Mount Tabor Church four miles west of the town, near the intersection of the Murfreesboro road and Potecasi Creek. Most of the civilian populace fled in panic, carrying away what valuables they could.

At about 10:20, the Union flotilla began bombarding the woods outside of Winton. Realizing he was facing no resistance after a handful of shots, Rowan ceased fire and had the vessels anchor close to the town. Small boats led by Hawkins and the commanding officer of the Perry, Lieutenant Charles W. Flusser, were used to bring contingents of the 9th New York Infantry to shore. Six companies subsequently occupied Winton, finding the streets strewn with stray arms, sacks, and blankets. Only a handful of residents remained, including an elderly white woman and several blacks. Hawkins found and interviewed Keen on her role in the previous day's ambush. She insisted that she was a slave of a Confederate officer and did as she was instructed under threat of death. To guard against Confederate attack, Flusser stationed three howitzers to cover approaches to the town and several scouting parties were dispatched.

The Union troops evacuated the straggling civilians while Hawkins toured the main portion of Winton to determine what buildings had been put to use by the Confederate forces. According to his report, he determined most structures had been used to quarter soldiers or store military supplies. He had guards posted at the buildings not thusly implicated and ordered the rest to be burned. Barrels of tar were rolled into the Hertford County Courthouse, smashed, and set on fire. Two men were found in the county jail after the burning had begun and were freed by a sailor from the Barney. Hawkins reported that at least $10,000 in military goods was found and burned. Despite Hawkins' apparent instructions, several buildings not slated for destruction were also set ablaze. Union troops then took to looting the town, stealing household wares, books, clothing, and livestock. Mattresses were torn open in the street and searched for valuables, pieces of furniture were smashed, and the post office was plundered.

Once the conflagration was well underway, Hawkins withdrew his troops to the wharf where they boarded their boats to return to the flotilla. While they did this, one civilian returned to Winton and, finding his clothes missing, went aboard one of the gunboats and fruitlessly demanded their return. Having by then learned that the waterway approaches to the railway bridges north of Winton had been fortified with chains, felled trees, and sunken blockships, the federals departed down the Chowan River and steamed back to Roanoke Island.

== Aftermath ==
=== Military implications ===
After failing to be attacked by Union forces, Colonel Williams withdrew his Confederates through Murfreesboro to Newsoms, Virginia, whereupon he received orders from General Albert G. Blanchard to return to Winton. Nichols withdrew his artillery to Suffolk, Virginia, arriving on February 21. (Note: The reasons for Williams' complete retreat from the area are unknown. General Blanchard found "no reason or excuse" for the withdrawal. Lieutenant Colonel Henry K. Burgwyn wrote a letter to North Carolina Governor Henry Toole Clark in which he criticized Nichols for not keeping his artillery in place to fire upon the Union forces and quoted a lieutenant who was critical of Williams' lack of formal military education. Historian Thomas C. Parramore alluded to "courage [not being] Williams' strongest virtue".) Williams' troops returned to Winton several days later as the 24th North Carolina Infantry Regiment moved to Murfreesboro, doing much to calm the local populace. Regardless, throughout the remainder of the war federal gunboats were active on the Chowan River and Unionist raiders moved through the countryside, disrupting Hertford County's economic and social life. Following its return to Roanoke, the 9th New York Infantry was combined with two other regiments to form a brigade under Hawkins and garrison the island. The federals thereafter focused their attention on New Bern, culminating in an attack upon the city in March.

=== Media response ===
The destruction of Winton was excoriated in Southern newspapers and provoked mixed reactions in the Northern press. The Day Book of Norfolk complained of a "vile incendiary". The March 12 edition of the North Carolina Standard printed a letter from a Winton resident describing the sacking of the town and followed it with editorial commentary, asking, "[W]hat confidence can anyone have in the pretenses of Burnside and Goldsborough, as to their designs not to disturb private property?" A campaign by New York journalist George Wilkes to raise funds for medallions to honor the Zouaves' service at Roanoke Island was sharply curtailed as rumors spread of the burning and pillaging at Winton. The money collected was eventually used to gift a sword to Hawkins. Burnside defended Hawkins in his report of the incident, erroneously blaming the scale of the conflagration to shifting winds, and after several days of review the U.S. War Department concluded there had been no wrongdoing.

=== Impact on Winton and legacy ===
The burning in Winton resulted in the destruction of all buildings in the town save for the Methodist church and one or two other structures. Almost all Hertford County records collected from 1830 to 1862 were destroyed in the burning of the courthouse. The county court subsequently convened in a private home and then in a proximate church and organized a committee to investigate the activities of local free persons of color with regards to the attack on the town. Hawkins described the burning as apparently "the first instance during the war [...] where fire has accompanied the sword." After the war, the town slowly rebuilt, with a new courthouse erected in 1870. In 1940, a North Carolina Highway Historical Marker was erected in Winton to commemorate the event.

== Works cited ==
- Allen, George H. (1887). Forty-six Months with the Fourth R. I. Volunteers in the War of 1861 to 1865. Providence.
- Barrett, John G. (2017). The Civil War in North Carolina (reprint ed.). Chapel Hill: The University of North Carolina Press. ISBN 9781469639666.
- Hawkins, Rush C. (1887). "Early Coast Operations in North Carolina". Battles and Leaders of the Civil War. Vol. 1. New York: Century Company. pp. 632–659.
- Parramore, Thomas C. (1962). "The Burning of Winton In 1862". The North Carolina Historical Review. 39 (1): 18–31. JSTOR 23517317.
- Trotter, William R. (1989). Ironclads and Columbiads: the Civil War in North Carolina: The Coast. Winston-Salem: John F. Blair. ISBN 0-89587-088-6.
