= Henry S. Lansing =

American army officer

Henry Seymour Lansing
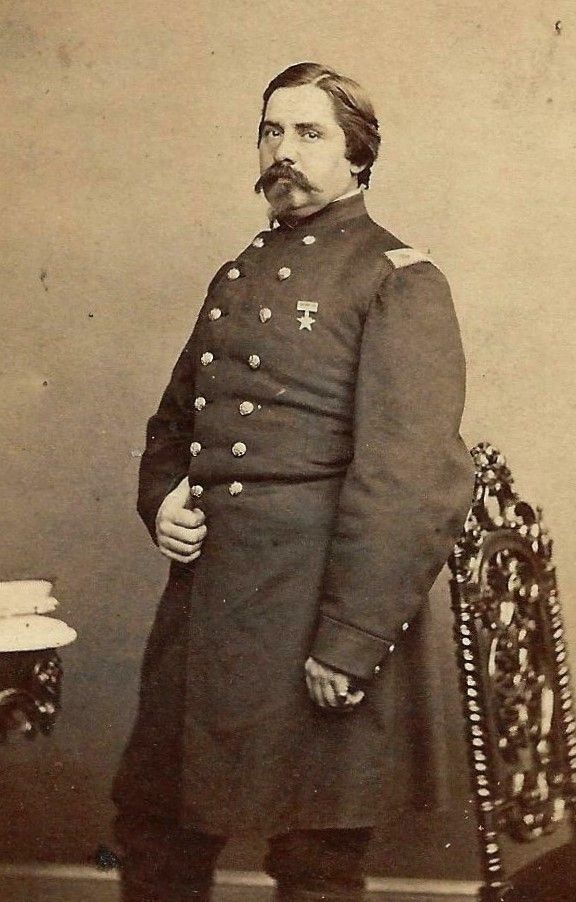
- Born: February 17, 1824; Utica, New York, US
- Died: April 13, 1882 (aged 58); Burlington, New Jersey, US
- Burial place: St. Mary's Episcopal Church, Burlington, New Jersey, US
- Military career
- Allegiance: United States (Union)
- Branch: United States Army (Union Army)
- Service years: 1861–1863
- Rank: Colonel; Brevet Brigadier General
- Unit: 12th New York Infantry Regiment
- Commands: 17th New York Infantry Regiment
- Conflicts: American Civil War: Peninsula campaign; Siege of Yorktown; Seven Days Battles; Northern Virginia Campaign; Second Battle of Bull Run

Henry Seymour Lansing (1824–1882) was an American Brevet Brigadier General who commanded the 17th New York Infantry Regiment during some of the deadliest battles of the American Civil War as well as commanding the 3rd Brigade of the 1st Division of the V Corps.

== Biography ==
=== Early years ===
Henry was born at Utica, New York, as the son of Barent Bleecker Lansing and Sarah Breese Lansing Platt as well as the brother of Henry Livingston Lansing. Prior to the war, Lansing was a key participant of the establishment of the Military Association of New York.

=== American Civil War ===
Lansing initially was assigned to the 12th New York Infantry Regiment as a captain. He was then assigned to organize the 17th New York Infantry Regiment on May 29, 1861, for a two-year term of service. Lansing would fight at the Siege of Yorktown as well as the Seven Days Battles but was wounded during the latter and had to be taken to a hospital. On October 17, the 17th New York became part of the Army of the Potomac and Lansing was the commander of the 3rd Brigade of the 1st Division of the V Corps Briefly during 2nd Bull run. Lansing would then participate at the battles of 2nd Bull Run, Lansing was honorably discharged when his regiment was mustered out on June 2, 1863.

=== Post-War years ===
After the war, he was brevetted to Brigadier General on March 13, 1865, for "faithful and meritorious services during the war". Lansing then worked for the American European Express and spent several years in Paris as their representative and on 1876, was an auditor of the Philadelphia Centennial. He also was active in veterans affairs, being in the George G. Meade Post No. 1 of the Grand Army of the Republic since January 29, 1879. Lansing died on April 13, 1882, and was buried at St. Mary's Episcopal Church, Burlington, New Jersey.

== See also ==
- List of American Civil War brevet generals (Union)
