= 55th United States Colored Infantry Regiment =

Union Army infantry regiment

55th United States Colored Infantry Regiment 1st Alabama Volunteer Infantry Regiment (African Descent)
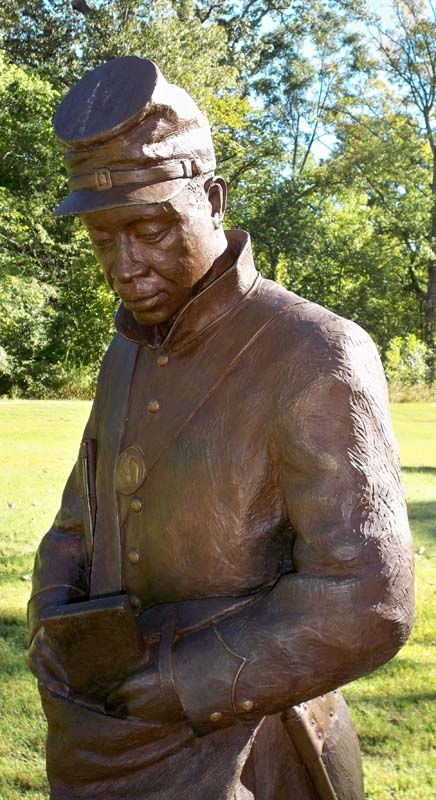
- Bronze statue representing the 55th US Colored Infantry is at Shiloh National Military Park.
- Active: 21 May 1863 – 31 December 1865
- Country: United States
- Allegiance: (United States) Union
- Branch: Union Army
- Type: Infantry
- Size: Regiment
- Equipment: Rifled musket
- Engagements: American Civil War; Battle of Brices Cross Roads (1864); Action at Waterford (1864)

Commanders
- Notable commanders: Nelson B. Bartram

The 55th United States Colored Infantry Regiment was a United States Colored Troops infantry regiment in the Union Army during the American Civil War. It was first organized as the 1st Alabama Volunteer Infantry Regiment (African Descent) in May 1863, serving on garrison duty at Corinth, Mississippi and Memphis, Tennessee. It was redesignated as the 55th United States Colored Infantry in March 1864, continuing its garrison service in Tennessee and fighting at the Battle of Brices Cross Roads. After the end of the war, the regiment was mustered out in late 1865 after garrison duty in Louisiana.

== History ==
=== Corinth ===
After the Emancipation Proclamation, runaway slaves began pouring into Corinth and the Union forces occupying the town were compelled to feed and shelter them. In November 1862, the Federal commander, Brigadier General Grenville M. Dodge decided that the former slaves, called contrabands, needed a protected campsite. At first the former slaves were housed in old tents or sheds. Dodge appropriated an abandoned plantation and asked the African Americans to grow their own food. Dodge also used some former slaves as scouts in a large military intelligence network that he set up in the western Confederacy. He made the contraband camp official in December 1862, giving James M. Alexander, the chaplain of the 66th Illinois Infantry Regiment authority over it. During its existence, the camp housed between 2,500 and 6,000 people, and boasted a church, a commissary, and other structures. Since his white soldiers disliked having to guard the contraband camp, Dodge uniformed, armed, and trained two companies of Black soldiers with white officers to take over guard duties. Confederates threatened to hang Dodge if they ever caught him, but he was more afraid of getting into trouble with the United States government for exceeding his authority. Dodge was summoned to Washington, D.C. to speak with the president, and was greatly relieved when Abraham Lincoln wanted to talk about the transcontinental railroad.

Finally, in the spring of 1863, Dodge, commander of the District of Corinth, received permission to raise one or two regiments of African Americans, and by 19 May a total of 600 men had been recruited. The 1st Alabama Volunteer Infantry Regiment (African Descent) was organized at the Corinth contraband camp on 21 May 1863, an unattached unit of the District of Corinth, part of the 2nd Division, XVI Corps, Department of the Tennessee. The regiment received its designation due to a large number of its men being freed slaves who had escaped from western Alabama. Alexander was appointed colonel, and supervised several days of drill in late May before the regiment was put on guard, picket, and fatigue duty. Picket posts manned by the 1st Alabama were located at the Hamburg, Glendale, Clear Creek and Danville Roads on the eastern approaches to Corinth. The regiment received the national colors in a 21 June ceremony.

In October 1863, Company A transferred to Pocahontas, Tennessee to guard a bridge along the Memphis-Corinth military railroad, returning to Corinth during the month. Companies B, C, E, G, H, and K were sent to Big Hill, Tennessee in the same month to guard another bridge on the Memphis and Charleston Railroad, returning to Corinth by November. The regiment continued to serve on garrison duty at Corinth, and was assigned to the Post of Corinth under the 2nd Division in November.

=== Memphis, Sturgis' expedition, and Smith's expedition ===
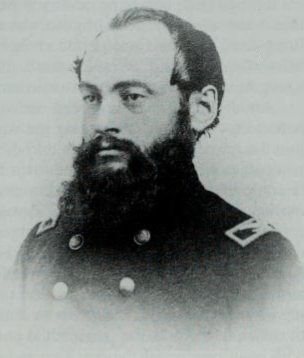
Edward Bouton

The regiment transferred in January 1864 to the 1st Colored Brigade of the District of Memphis, part of the 5th Division, XVI Corps, serving on garrison duty at Memphis. Relations between civilians and the colored troops at Memphis became strained due to civilian complaints of nighttime pillaging by colored troops. The regiment was redesignated as the 55th United States Colored Infantry Regiment (USCI) on 11 March 1864, when most colored units with state designations switched to Federal designations. It was transferred to Fort Pickering in the Post and Defenses of Memphis, part of the District of West Tennessee, in April. On 27 April 1864, Alexander was dismissed and James M. Irvin assumed command as colonel until he resigned on 16 March 1865. Edgar M. Lowe was lieutenant colonel until he resigned on 28 February 1865.

Between 1 and 13 June 1864 the 55th USCI participated in Brigadier General Samuel D. Sturgis' expedition into Mississippi as part of the 3rd Brigade of its Infantry Division. The regiment assembled with the expedition at Lafayette in the first days of June, having moved there by rail alongside the 59th United States Colored Infantry, the other regiment of the brigade. The colonel of the 59th USCI, Edward Bouton, was placed in command of the brigade. The expedition set out before dawn on 3 June through heavy rain, with the 55th and 59th USCI guarding the wagon train. The train caught up with the main body of the expedition on 4 June, and remained in camp on 5 June. It reached Ripley two days later and advanced towards Tupelo on the morning of 10 June. At this point the regiment was split up along the wagon train with four men walking beside each wagon.

The regiment fought in the Union defeat at the Battle of Brices Cross Roads on 10 June 1864, the retreat through Ripley on 11 June, and the engagement at Davis' Mills on 12 June. The regiment returned to Memphis, rejoining the 1st Colored Brigade, now part of the District of West Tennessee. Losses in the battle were 1 officer and 6 enlisted men killed, 2 officers and 45 men wounded, and 4 officers and 137 men missing. At Moscow, Tennessee, 1 enlisted man was killed. From 1 to 30 August the regiment participated in Major General Andrew Jackson Smith's expedition to Oxford, Mississippi, fighting in the action at Waterford between 16 and 17 August. The 55th USCI returned to Memphis, where it briefly transferred to the 2nd Brigade of the Post and Defenses of Memphis in January 1865. At Waterford, 1 enlisted man was killed and 5 were missing.

=== Louisiana ===
The regiment was ordered to New Orleans on 23 February 1865 and then to Morganza, becoming part of the 2nd Brigade, United States Colored Troops, of the District of Morganza in the Department of the Gulf. From April the 55th USCI served in the District of Port Hudson on garrison duty at Baton Rouge and other locations in Louisiana until it mustered out on December 31. At the time of its mustering out, the field officers were Colonel Nelson B. Bartram, Lieutenant Colonel William B. McCord, and Major Frank M. Ewing.

== See also ==
- List of Alabama Union Civil War regiments
- List of United States Colored Troops Civil War units

== Bibliography ==
- Brent, Joseph E. (1995). Occupied Corinth: The Contraband Camp and The First Alabama Regiment of African Descent 1862–1864. Corinth, Mississippi: City of Corinth, Mississippi, and the Siege and Battle of Corinth Commission.
- Dobak, William A. (2011). Freedom by the Sword: The U.S. Colored Troops, 1862-1867 (PDF). Washington D.C.: U.S. Army Center of Military History. ISBN 978-1-7803-9234-9. Archived from the original (PDF) on September 21, 2012.
- Dyer, Frederick H. (1908). A Compendium of the War of the Rebellion: 55th U.S. Colored Infantry Regiment. Des Moines, Iowa: Dyer Publishing Co. pp. 113, 1732.
- Dyer, Frederick H. (1959). A Compendium of the War of the Rebellion. Vol. 3. New York: Sagamore Press Inc., Thomas Yoseloff. LCCN 59012963.
- Lovett, Bobby L. (1980). "The West Tennessee Colored Troops in Civil War Combat". West Tennessee Historical Society Papers. 34: 53–70.
- Official Army Register of the Volunteer Force of the United States Army for the Years 1861, '62, '63, '64, '65. Part VIII: Territories of Washington, New Mexico, Nebraska, Colorado, Dakota, Veteran Reserve Corps, U.S. Veteran Volunteers (First Army Corps) U.S Volunteers, U.S. Colored Troops. Washington, D.C.: Adjutant General's Office. 1867. OCLC 686779.
- Smith, Timothy B. (2012). Corinth 1862: Siege, Battle, Occupation. Lawrence, Kan.: University Press of Kansas. ISBN 978-0-7006-2345-7.
