= 17th New York Veteran Infantry Regiment =

- Active: October 18, 1863, to June 13, 1865
- Country: United States
- Allegiance: Union
- Branch: Infantry
- Engagements: Engagements around Decatur; Battle of Jonesborough; Battle of Lovejoy's Station; Engagement at Louisville; Siege of Savannah; Battle of Averasborough; Battle of Bentonville

The 17th New York Veteran Infantry Regiment was an infantry regiment that served in the United States Army during the American Civil War. It was often referred to as the 17th New York Veteran Zouaves and has been erroneously reported as using mules as mounts during Sherman's March to the Sea up until the Grand Review of the Armies. The regiment wore the Hawkins Zouave pattern uniform, which was first used by the 9th New York Volunteer Infantry, Hawkins Zouaves, and later was adopted by several other regiments including the 164th New York, 35th New Jersey and others.

== Military service, October 1863 to April 1865 ==
The regiment was organized in New York City, New York, from June to October 1863, with elements of the 9th (Hawkins' Zouaves), 11th (First Fire Zouaves), 17th, & 38th New York Volunteer Infantry Regiment's. The Regiment was mustered into United States service on October 18, 1863, in New York City for three years service with 900 officers and men under the command of Colonel William Thomas Campbell Grower, formerly the major of the 17th New York Volunteer Infantry Regiment.

When they left the State, they were composed almost wholly of veteran volunteers. Ordered to the Department of the Southwest under Major General Andrew Jackson Smith, they would later join the army of Major General William T. Sherman, and serve under him throughout the remainder of the war.

In December 1863, under General Andrew J. Smith, the regiment took part in the Tennessee Campaign chasing Confederate Major General Nathan B. Forrest's Cavalry command. Joining Major General William T. Sherman's forces at Vicksburg, Mississippi, in January 1864, the regiment took part in the Meridian Campaign from Vicksburg to Meridian, Mississippi, marching over 460 miles. In April they moved to Decatur, Alabama, where they were engaged in skirmishing with the Confederate forces under Brigadier General Philip D. Roddy, attacking them at Pond Spring, Courtland, etc., and routing them and capturing the whole of their camp. Joining the Army in the operations against Atlanta, Georgia, they took part in the fighting and siege against Atlanta with the 14th Army Corps. On September 1, 1864, at the Battle of Jonesboro they charged and fought against Confederate Major General Patrick R. Cleburne's Division, who boasted to never have been defeated, but who were then broken, routed, and had their works taken from them. It was there that Colonel William T.C. Grower was mortally wounded (dying several days later) and over 150 men left on the field as casualties. From Atlanta they pursued the Confederate Army of Tennessee, under General John Bell Hood, westward, marching over 600 miles back into Tennessee and Alabama. Returning to Atlanta they started the next morning on the March to the Sea from Atlanta to Savannah. Following the fall of Savannah, the regiment rested around Savannah before crossing into South Carolina with the Army. In the Carolina's Campaign they marched through South Carolina into North Carolina, being engaged at Averasboro, North Carolina, where Lieutenant Colonel James Lake was severely wounded. A few days later they took part in their last major engagement at Bentonville, North Carolina, where, despite being completely surrounded, it held off several attacks.

Following the surrender of the Confederate Forces under General Joseph E. Johnston on April 26, 1865, at Durham Station, North Carolina, the regiment took part in the rapid march through Richmond, Virginia, and onto Washington, D.C. Camping at Alexandria, Virginia, they took part in the Grand Review of the Army later that month, and were soon thereafter mustered out of service. General William Vandever said of the regiment, "...In all the essential qualities which distinguish the heroic citizen soldier, the Seventeenth New York has been excelled by none." While General Jefferson C. Davis wrote, "...its soldierly conduct, attention to duty, and invariably gallant conduct in action, has reflected credit upon itself and the corps."

== Military service, 1865 ==
The regiment was mustered out of service on June 13, 1865, at Alexandria, Virginia, under the command of Lieutenant Colonel James Lake, with less than 200 officers and men.

This Regiment was composed of Wilson’s old Zouaves and roughs from New York City and they were a rough set . . . but yet there was not a better fighting regiment in the whole division than the 17th New York.

— Lucius Barber, member of the 15th Illinois Volunteer Infantry Regiment

In all the essential qualities which distinguish the heroic citizen soldier, the Seventeenth New York has been excelled by none. Representatives as you are of the great city of New York, your association with the men of the northwest, composing the balance of the brigade, has been of the most pleasing and genial kind.

— The New York Times

== Casualties ==
The regiment suffered the following casualties during its service.

- Killed in action: 1 officer, 38 enlisted
- Died of wounds: 1 officer, 16 enlisted
- Died of disease and other causes: 65 enlisted (2 died as POW's)
- Wounded but recovered: 6 officers, 111 enlisted
- Captured or missing: 1 officer, 39 enlisted
- Total: 213 casualties

== Commanding officers ==
- Colonel William Thomas Campbell Grower
- Lieutenant Colonel Edward Jardine
- Lieutenant Colonel James Lake
- Lieutenant Colonel Joel O. Martin
- Major Charles Hilbert
- Major James B. Horner
- Major Alexander S. Marshall

== See also ==
- List of New York Civil War regiments
- New York State Military Museum and Veterans Research Center – Civil War – 17th Veteran Infantry Regiment History, photographs, historical sketch, table of battles and casualties, and Civil War newspaper clippings, for the 17th New York Veteran Volunteer Infantry Regiment.
- Palmetto Riflemen & New York Zouaves American Civil War Living History / Reenactor Group that portrays Company H of the 17th New York Veteran Volunteer Infantry Regiment.
