= Rush Hawkins =

Union Army general

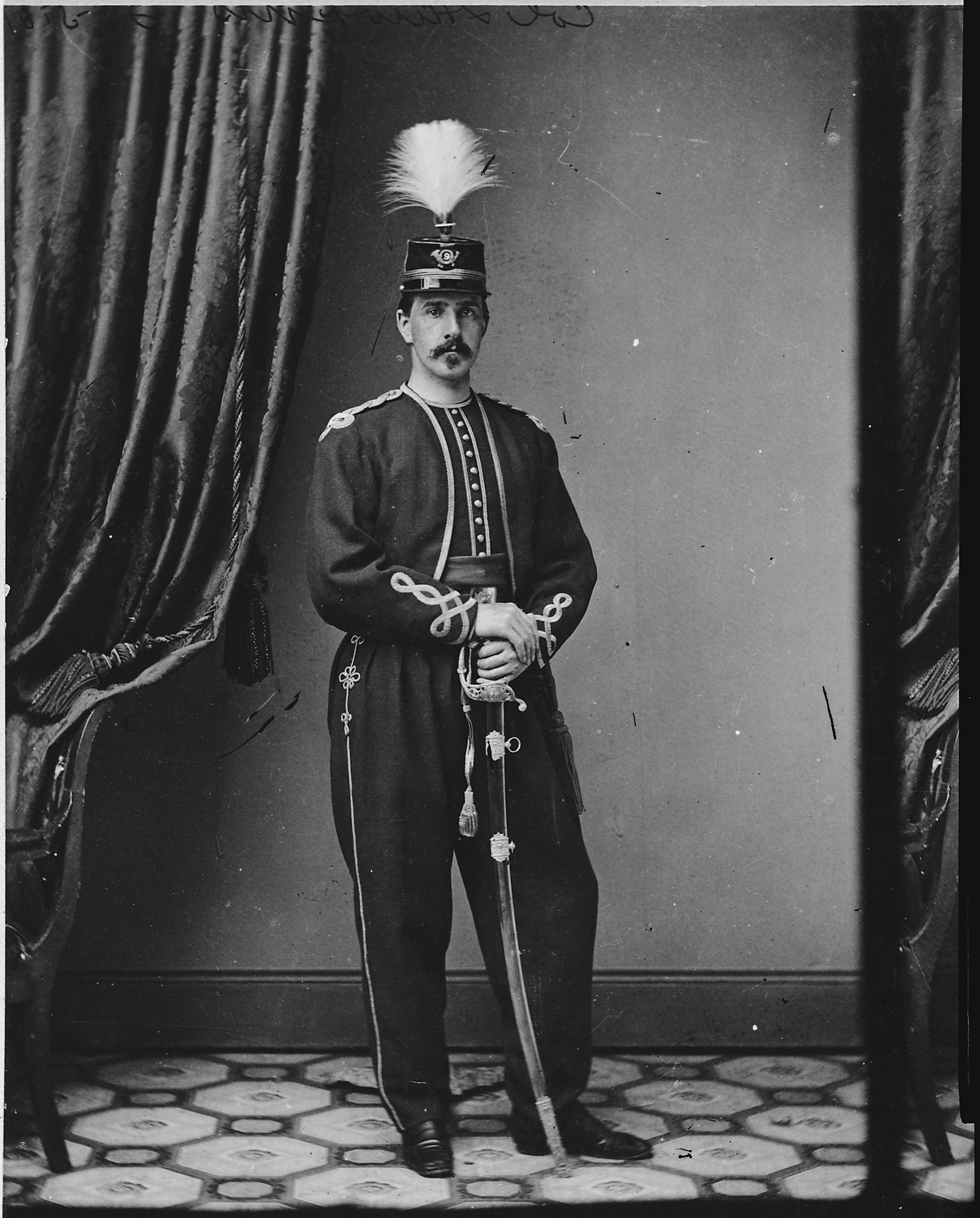
- Born: September 14, 1831; Pomfret, Vermont
- Died: October 25, 1920 (aged 89); New York City, New York
- Burial place: Brown University Providence, Rhode Island
- Military career
- Allegiance: United States of America; Union
- Branch: United States Army; Union Army
- Service years: 1846–1847; 1861–1863
- Rank: Colonel; Brevet Brigadier General
- Commands: 9th New York Infantry
- Conflicts: American Civil War; Battle of Hatteras Inlet Batteries; Chicamacomico Races; Burnside's North Carolina Expedition; Battle of Roanoke Island; Burning of Winton; Battle of New Bern; Battle of South Mills; Battle of Fredericksburg; Siege of Suffolk
- Other work: Politics

Rush Christopher Hawkins (September 14, 1831 – October 25, 1920) was a lawyer, Union colonel in the American Civil War, politician, book collector, and art patron. He was mustered out of the Union Army in 1863 but served in the New York Militia in 1865. In 1866, in consideration of his prior service, he was nominated and confirmed for appointment to the grade of brevet brigadier general of volunteers to rank from March 13, 1865.

== Early life ==
Hawkins was born in Pomfret, Vermont to Lorenzo Dow Hawkins and Maria Louisa (Hutchinson) Hawkins. At age 15, Hawkins enlisted in the 2nd United States Dragoons for service in the Mexican–American War. After the war, he settled in New York City where he studied law.

Hawkins married Annmary Brown in 1860; she died in January 1903 of pneumonia.

== Civil War ==
In 1861, Hawkins helped raise the 9th New York Infantry, a Zouave-styled regiment, popularly known as "Hawkins Zouaves" for service in the Civil War. Hawkins was appointed colonel of the regiment on May 4, 1861, and served with distinction in North Carolina early in the war. He was part of Benjamin F. Butler's expedition to capture Fort Hatteras in 1861. Expecting to win a promotion to brigadier general for his service at Fort Hatteras he was instead relieved of command for insubordination. On October 8, 1861, a disgruntled Hawkins wrote "brigadier generals are made of such queer stuff nowadays, that I should not esteem it any great honor to be made one." Hawkins would in fact receive a brevet promotion to brigadier general in 1866 to rank from March 13, 1865. Despite his belligerence an early dispatch of Hawkins' caught the attention of President Abraham Lincoln. Hawkins was invited to the White House to confer with the President and General-in-Chief George B. McClellan. There he was instrumental in convincing the Union high command of the possibility of a combined operation against Pamlico Sound in North Carolina.

The idea became the objective of Ambrose Burnside's North Carolina Expedition. Hawkins was again conspicuous at the battles of Roanoke Island and New Bern in 1862.

On February 19, Hawkins accompanied his Zouaves on board the USS Deleware at the head of a convoy of federal gunboats steaming towards the town of Winton along the Chowan River. Hawkins was ordered by Burnside to investigate reports of Unionist sympathies in Winton and to destroy rail bridges north of the town. He climbed atop the Deleware's crosstrees to serve as the expedition's lookout. Reaching the town in the late afternoon, the Delaware moved to dock at the wharf before Hawkins noticed Confederate troops massing in the brush atop a bluff to ambush the convoy. Hawkins ordered the pilot to reverse course and began to descend from the crosstrees as the Confederates opened fire. The ratlines were severed by rifle fire as Hawkins climbed down, causing him to plummet onto the deck, though he escaped injury. Once it was out of musket range, the Delaware, then joined by the USS Commodore Perry, opened fire with their artillery upon the bluff, causing the Confederates to disperse. The Union ships withdrew down the river to link up with the rest of the convoy. The federal commanders resolved to return the following morning and directly attack the town. Faced with a full assault, Confederate forces withdrew to prepared positions several miles outside of Winton.

Hawkins led his Zouaves in landing at Winton on February 20, which they found largely deserted. While the lingering inhabitants were evacuated, he inspected the town's buildings to determine which had been used by the Confederate forces. Finding that most structures had been utilized to quarter soldiers or house their stores, Hawkins ordered guards posted at the few buildings deemed of no military interest and for his men to burn the rest of the village. The Hertford County Courthouse, a local hotel, and numerous homes, including ones apparently meant to be preserved, were subsequently razed; by the end of the conflagration, only the Methodist church and one or two homes remained standing. The federal forces also took to plundering the town of food and valuables. Hearing reports that the rail bridges north of the town were unassailable due to blockages in the waterways laid by Confederates, Hawkins withdrew his forces to the boats as the town burned and steamed away downriver.

The destruction of Winton was excoriated in Southern newspapers and provoked mixed reactions in the Northern press. A campaign by New York journalist George Wilkes to raise funds for medallions to honor the Zouaves' service at Roanoke Island was sharply curtailed as rumors spread of the burning and pillaging at Winton. The money collected was eventually used to gift a sword to Hawkins. Burnside defended Hawkins in his report of the incident, erroneously blaming the scale of the conflagration to shifting winds, and after several days of review the U.S. War Department concluded there had been no wrongdoing.

Upon the arrival of significant reinforcements to North Carolina in April 1862, Hawkins assumed command of a brigade. Hawkins' brigade was attached to Jesse L. Reno's division and fought at the Battle of South Mills on April 19, 1862, where he was wounded in the left arm.

After recovering Hawkins returned to Virginia with his regiment and briefly commanded the 1st Brigade, 3rd Division in the newly formed IX Corps. He was not present with the brigade during the Maryland Campaign but resumed command during the battle of Fredericksburg. After Fredericksburg, the 3rd Division, commanded by George W. Getty, was transferred to the VII Corps in southeast Virginia. Hawkins led his brigade (now the 1st Brigade, 2nd Division, VII Corps) during the siege of Suffolk. Just two days before the siege was lifted, Hawkins turned over command of his brigade and on May 20, 1863, was mustered out of the volunteer service with his old regiment. He did not return to active duty. On July 9, 1866, President Andrew Johnson nominated Hawkins for appointment to the grade of brevet brigadier general of volunteers, to rank from March 13, 1865, and the United States Senate confirmed the appointment on July 23, 1866. He remained active in the New York Militia receiving a brevet promotion to brigadier general of New York Militia in 1865.

== Later life ==
Hawkins was a Republican member of the New York State Assembly (New York Co., 11th D.) in 1872. He became a noted—and certainly obsessive—rare book collector, having started shortly before the Civil War. He amassed a collection of 225 incunabula; his goal was to have the first and second books from every European printer before 1501. He was able to acquire 130 of the 238 known fifteenth century European printers. In 1990, the book collection was moved from the Annmary Brown Memorial at Brown University and transferred to the John Hay Library.

Hawkins recruited Margaret Bingham Stillwell as curator at the Annmary Brown Memorial where she worked from 1917-1953.

Hawkins and his wife were also avid art collectors and created an excellent collection of 19th century American art. Hawkins was appointed Assistant to the Commissioner General for the United States Commission to the 1889 Universal Exposition in Paris, France. Hawkins was "Commissaire Expert des Beaux Arts" and was responsible for selecting and organizing American art works for the exhibition. Hawkins feuded with James McNeill Whistler, who removed all of his work in protest and later wrote The Gentle Art of Making Enemies (1890), which in-part details his experiences with Hawkins.

While attempting to cross the street in front of his home at 42 5th Avenue in New York City, Hawkins was struck by a motorist and died from his injuries on October 25, 1920. He is buried with his wife in a crypt at the Annmary Brown Memorial on the Brown University campus in Providence, Rhode Island. In his will he left most of his estate to the Society for the Prevention of Cruelty to Animals.

== See also ==
- List of American Civil War brevet generals (Union)
- Annmary Brown Memorial

== Works cited ==
- Parramore, Thomas C. (1962). "The Burning of Winton In 1862". The North Carolina Historical Review. 39 (1): 18–31. JSTOR 23517317.

New York State Assembly
Preceded by Lawrence O'Brien	New York State Assembly; New York County, 11th District; 1872	Succeeded by Alonzo B. Cornell
