= Nelson B. Bartram =

Teacher, official, and colonel in the U.S. Army

- Born: January 7, 1832; Westport, New York, US
- Died: December 25, 1886 (aged 54); White Plains, New York, US
- Burial place: White Plains Rural Cemetery
- Military career
- Allegiance: United States of America: Union
- Branch: Union Army
- Service years: 1861–1865
- Rank: Colonel
- Unit: 17th New York Infantry Regiment
- Commands: 20th U.S. Colored Infantry Regiment
- Conflicts: American Civil War

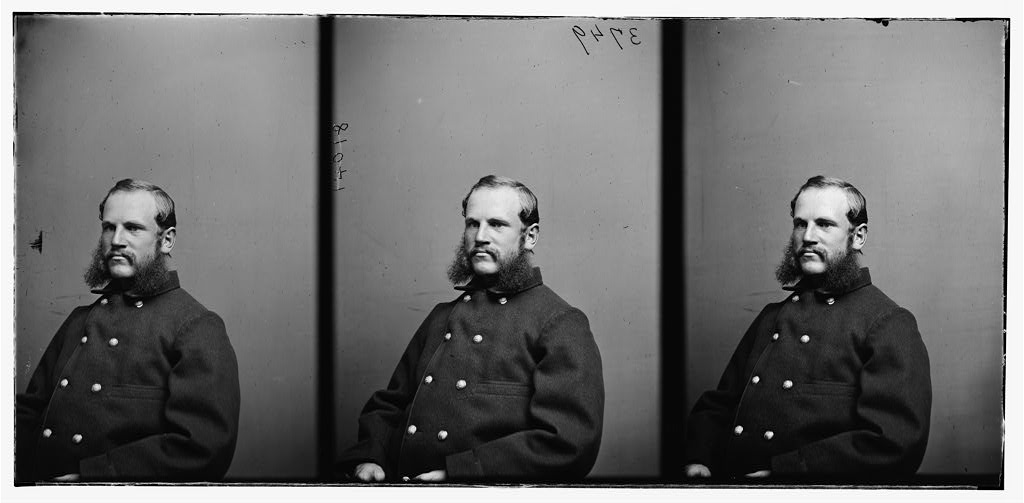

Nelson B. Bartram (January 7, 1832 - December 25, 1886) was a teacher, official, and colonel in the U.S. Army who commanded United States Colored Troops during the American Civil War. The Library of Congress has a glass negative photograph of him.

== Biography ==
Bartram was born in Westport, New York. He married Annie Van Dyke in 1857. They had six children. A statue of him by John Massey Rhind stands in Port Chester, New York.

When the American Civil War broke out Bartram joined the Union Army, being commissioned as Captain of Company B of the 17th New York Infantry Regiment on May 22, 1861. Over the next year he was promoted to Major and Lieutenant Colonel in his regiment. He spent much of 1862 on the staff of General Daniel Butterfield and continued to serve with his unit until it was mustered out in June 1863. Then he served as Lieutenant Colonel of the 15th New York Cavalry Regiment and the 8th U.S. Colored Infantry before becoming Colonel of the 20th U.S. Colored Infantry Regiment in January 1864.

His regiment trained on Riker's Island. When it debuted in New York City it was a celebrated event covered by the New York Times. The Times noted the event followed the New York City draft riots when public buildings, leaders, and African Americans in the city were attacked. He served with his unit until being mustered out in late 1865, briefly leading the 55th U.S. Colored Infantry Regiment before leaving the army on December 31.

After the war he served as a clerk and then deputy collector at a Customs House in New York. Bartram resided in Port Chester and White Plains. He died on December 25, 1886, and was buried in the latter on Rural Cemetery.

He was a superior officer for chaplain George LeVere, who he dined with after LeVere was excluded from an officer's mess for being African American.
