= Annmary Brown Memorial =

Art museum, library and mausoleum at Brown University

Coordinates: 41°49′27.5″N 71°24′8″W

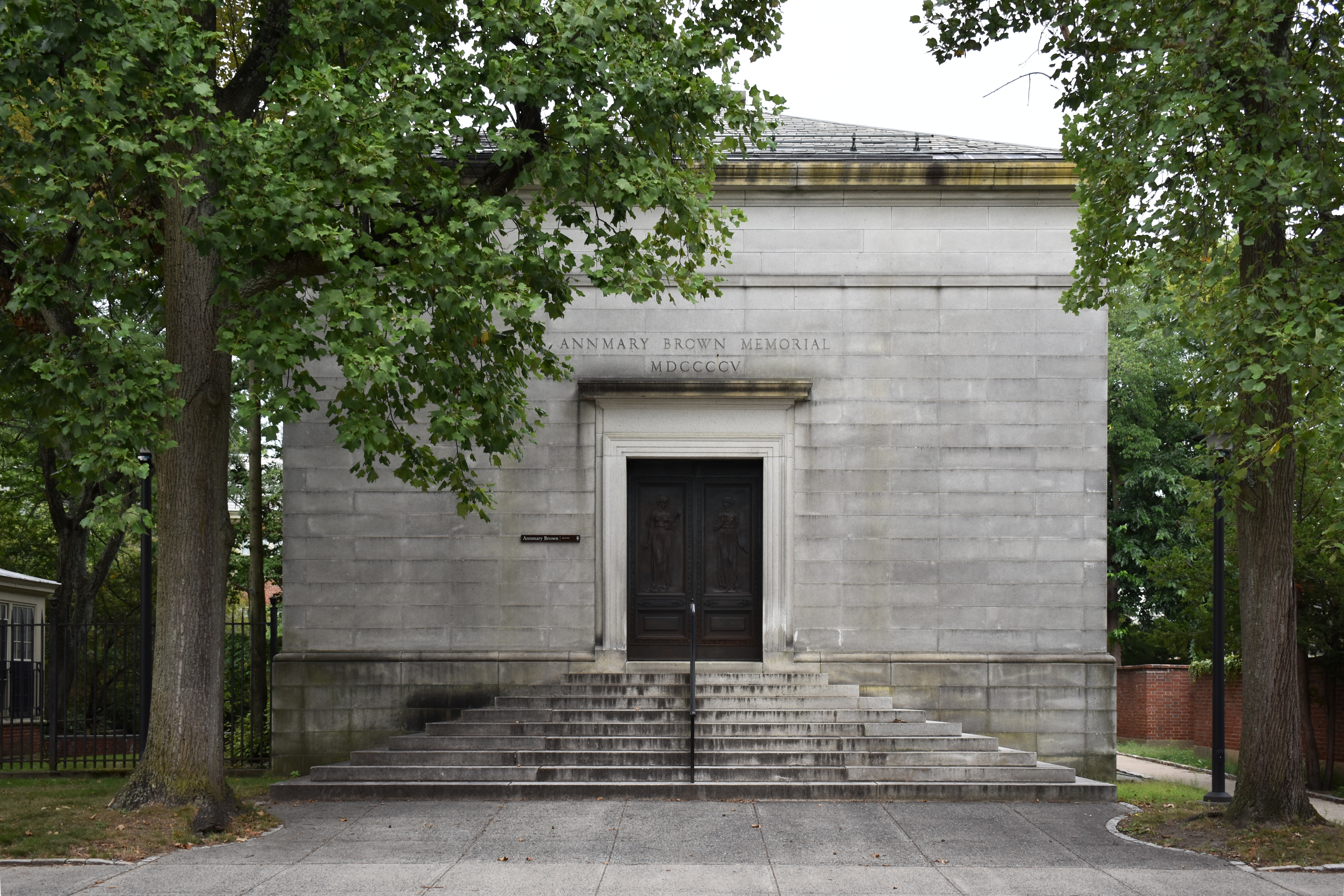
The Annmary Brown Memorial at 21 Brown Street.

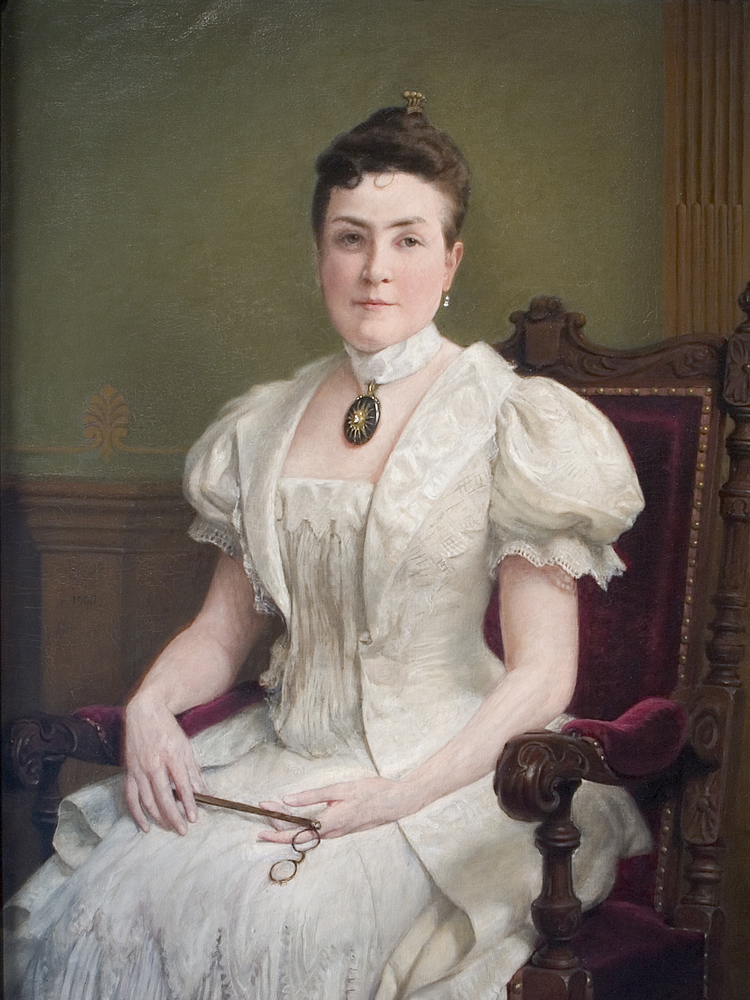
Annmary Brown Hawkins, painted by Seymour Guy

Annmary Brown Memorial is an art museum, library and mausoleum at Brown University. It is located at 21 Brown Street in Providence, Rhode Island. It is one of six libraries comprising the University Library system.

== History ==
The building, designed by architect Norman Isham, was completed in 1907 in the shape of a granite temple with bronze doors at the request of General Rush Hawkins. Hawkins intended it to house his collection, including incunabula, and to serve as a memorial to his wife, Annmary Brown (1837–1903). The Hawkinses are interred in a crypt at the building.

Margaret Bingham Stillwell, curator of the collection from 1917 to 1953, was a renowned bibliographer who also wrote histories of the library.

== Modern history ==
The museum merged with Brown University in 1948. In 1990, the collection was moved to the John Hay Library of Brown University.

Today, the museum features a wide array of art from around the world. The museum is normally open on Monday through Friday from 1:00 to 5:00 p.m. during the academic year, from Labor Day through Memorial Day.

== See also ==
- List of museums in Rhode Island
- List of libraries in Rhode Island
