= 110th United States Colored Infantry Regiment =

2nd Alabama Volunteer Infantry Regiment (African Descent)
- Active: November 20, 1863–June 25, 1864
- Disbanded: June 25, 1864
- Country: United States
- Allegiance: Union
- Branch: Infantry
- Size: Regiment
- Garrison/HQ: Pulaski, Tennessee; Athens, Tennessee
- Engagements: American Civil War

The 2nd Alabama Volunteer Infantry Regiment (African Descent) was an infantry regiment that served in the Union Army between November 20, 1863, and June 25, 1864, during the American Civil War.

== Service ==
The infantry regiment was organized at Pulaski, Tennessee, on November 20, 1863. From there it was attached to the 2nd Division, 16th Army Corps, Department of Tennessee. In the meantime, it was on garrison duty at Pulaski and Athens, Alabama, which included acting as guard for railroads into Northern Alabama until June 25, 1864. On June 25, 1864, the regiment was designated the 110th U.S. Regiment Colored Troops.

== See also ==
- List of Alabama Union Civil War regiments
- List of United States Colored Troops Civil War units

== Bibliography ==
- Dyer, Frederick H. (1959). A Compendium of the War of the Rebellion. Sagamore Press Inc. Thomas Yoseloff, Publisher, New York, New York. LCCN 59-12963.
