= Harrison Stiles Fairchild =

- Born: August 4, 1820; Cazenovia, New York, US
- Died: January 25, 1901 (aged 80); Rochester, New York, US
- Burial place: Mount Hope Cemetery; Rochester, New York
- Military career
- Allegiance: United States of America; Union
- Branch: United States Army; Union Army
- Service years: 1861–1865
- Rank: Colonel; Bvt. brigadier general
- Commands: 89th New York Infantry
- Conflicts: American Civil War: Peninsula Campaign; Battle of South Mountain; Battle of Antietam; Battle of Fredericksburg; Battle of Cold Harbor; Siege of Petersburg; Battle of Seven Pines; Battle of Appomattox Court House

Harrison Stiles Fairchild (August 4, 1820 – January 25, 1901), was a colonel and brevet brigadier general in the Union Army during the American Civil War. He commanded a brigade in Charles A. Heckman's Second Division of the XVIII Corps at the Battle of Chaffin's Farm.

== Early life ==
Harrison S. Fairchild was born in August 4, 1820, at Cazenovia, New York.

Harrison died on January 25, 1901, at the age of 80, and is buried at the Mount Hope Cemetery Rochester, New York.

== Sources ==
- Eicher, John; Eicher, David (2002). Civil War High Commands. Stanford University Press. p. 1040. ISBN 978-0804736411.
