= 1st Alabama Cavalry Regiment (Union) =

Union Army cavalry regiment

- Active: 1862–1865
- Disbanded: October 20, 1865
- Country: United States
- Allegiance: Union
- Branch: United States Army; Union Army
- Type: Cavalry
- Size: Regiment
- Engagements: American Civil War: Battle of Stones River; Streight's Raid; Atlanta Campaign; Sherman's March to the Sea; Carolinas Campaign

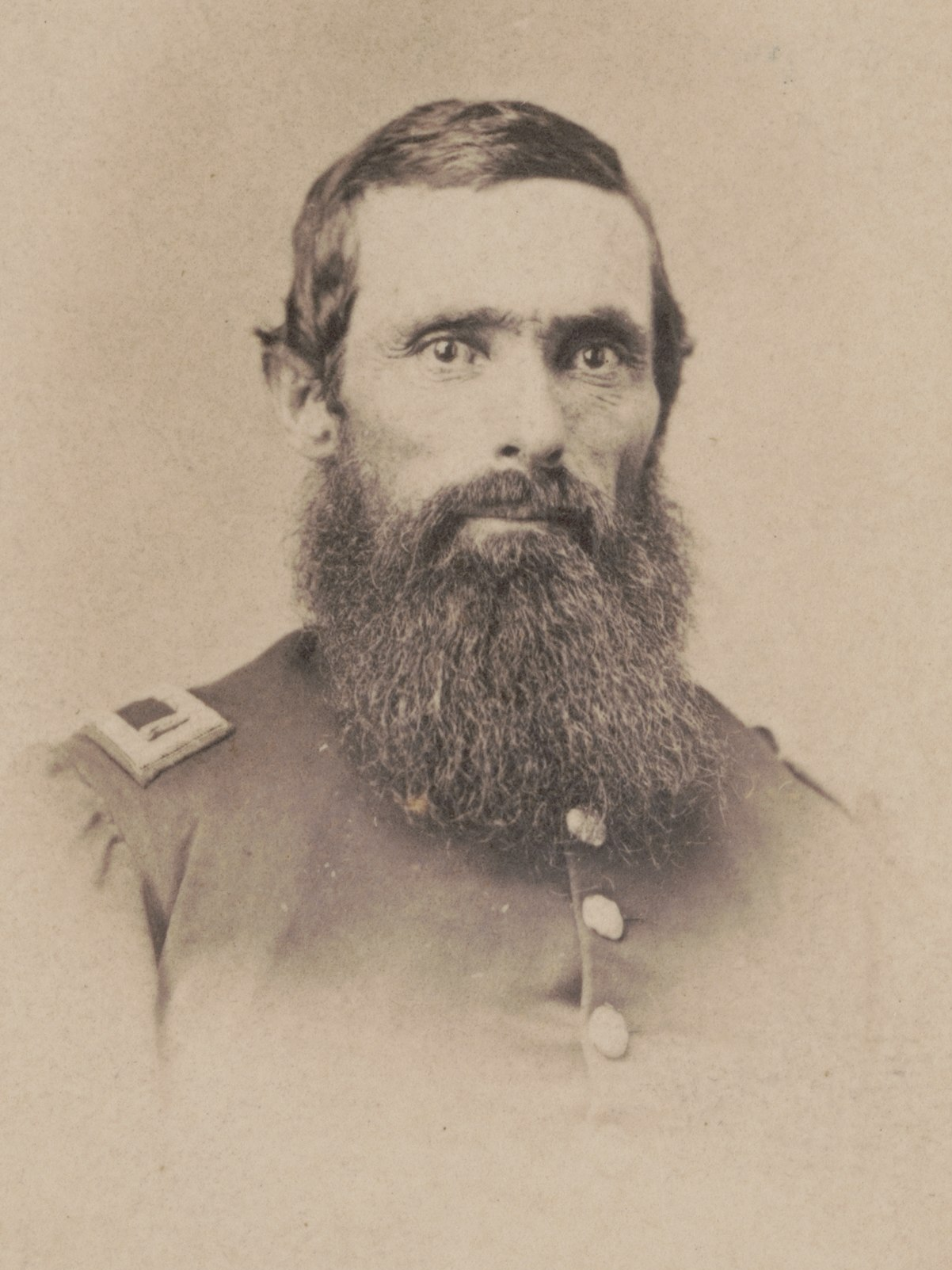
First Lieutenant Phillip A. Sternberg of Company B, 1st Alabama Cavalry

The 1st Alabama Cavalry Regiment was a cavalry regiment recruited from Alabama that served in the Union Army during the American Civil War. It was the only white Union regiment from Alabama, and it took part in several campaigns in the western theater before being mustered out of service in 1865.

== Unionism in North Alabama ==
North Alabama was the region of the state most opposed to leaving the Union, and when Alabama held a convention in January 1861 to consider secession from the United States, all of North Alabama's counties sent anti-secession delegates. North Alabama contained hill regions such as Winston County where only 3% of the population were enslaved, as well as the fertile Tennessee River valley counties such as Madison where slaves made up a majority of the population. Despite having an economic stake in the system of slavery, many whites in North Alabama were Southern Unionists who considered secession to be foolhardy and treasonous. North Alabama and neighboring regions of North Mississippi were occupied by Union forces in the summer of 1862, and at this point many Alabama Unionists volunteered to join the Federal army. Most of the approximately 2,000 soldiers who volunteered for the 1st Alabama Cavalry were local Alabama Unionists, with some enlistees other southern states, particularly Georgia, where the regiment recruited in 1864. 279 of the 1st Alabama's soldiers were deserters from Alabama Confederate units. Of the 2,678 white Alabamians who enlisted in the Union Army, 2,066 served in the 1st Alabama Cavalry.

== Service ==
The first companies of what would become the 1st Alabama Cavalry were recruited at Corinth, a northeast Mississippi railroad junction that had been occupied by Union forces since the spring of 1862, which subsequently became a haven for Unionists and escaped slaves. These two companies were designated as Companies D & E of the 1st Middle Tennessee Cavalry, and they joined Union forces at the Battle of Stones River in late 1862 and during Streight's Raid in the spring of 1863. Later these companies became Companies I & K of the 1st Alabama.

The regiment officially entered service in late 1862 after recruiting in Corinth, Mississippi and Huntsville, Alabama. The 1st Alabama's initial duties consisted of scouting missions and raids against Confederate-held railroads in Mississippi and Alabama, led by General Grenville M. Dodge.

During General William T. Sherman's Atlanta Campaign in 1864, the 1st Alabama acted as General Dodge's escort, guarding the wagon trains and railroads during the Union advance. The Regiment was based at Rome, Georgia for much of the Atlanta campaign and subsequent Franklin-Nashville Campaign, and recruited some new men from Georgia to fill their ranks. During Sherman's March to the Sea, Company I of the 1st Alabama served as General Sherman's personal escort company. The regiment then stayed with Sherman's forces through the Carolinas Campaign in the spring of 1865, fighting at the Battle of Monroe's Crossroads on March 10, until Confederate forces in North Carolina surrendered in late April. On May 4, General Sherman ordered the 1st Alabama to return to Knoxville, Tennessee to serve on occupation duty. The 1st Alabama Cavalry was mustered out of service on October 25, 1865.

== Commanders ==
Commanding officers of the 1st Alabama Cavalry:

- Col. George E. Spencer, promoted to brevet brigadier general, March 13, 1865.
- Lt. Col. George L. Godfrey
- Lt. Col. Orzo J. Dodds

== See also ==
- List of Alabama Union Civil War regiments
