= 9th New York Infantry Regiment =

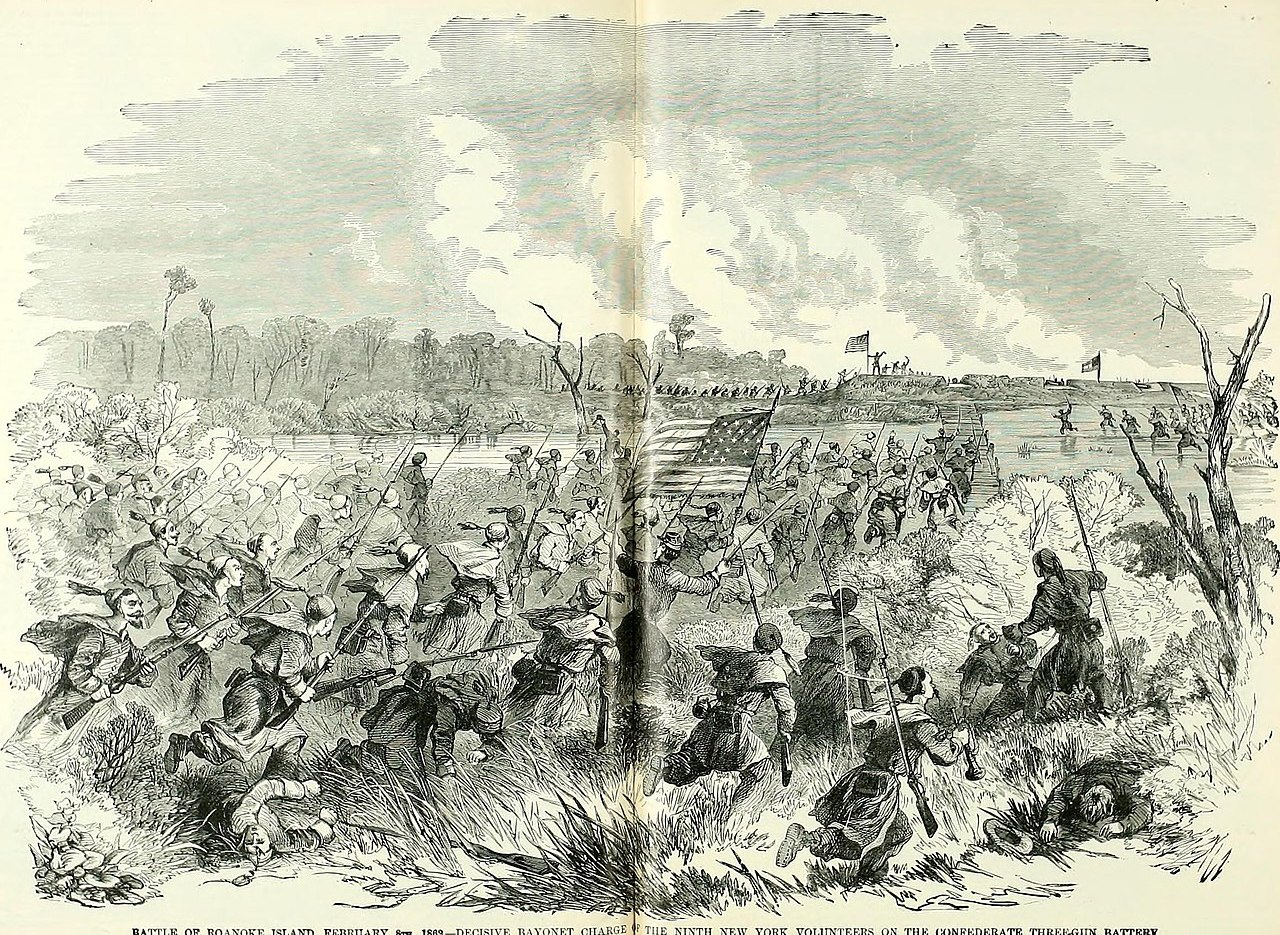
- Charge of the 9th at the Battle of Roanoke Island
- Active: May 4, 1861–May 20, 1863
- Country: United States
- Branch: Infantry, zouave
- Engagements: Skirmish at Smith's Farm; Battle of Forts Clark and Hatteras; Battle of Roanoke Island; Burning of Winton; Battle of Elizabeth City; Battle of South Mills; Battle of Antietam; Battle of Fredericksburg; Siege of Suffolk; New York Draft Riots

Commanders
- Notable commanders: Colonel Rush Christopher Hawkins

Insignia
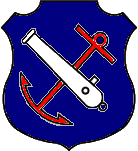
- 3rd Division, IX Corps

The 9th New York Infantry Regiment was an infantry regiment that served in the Union Army during the American Civil War. It was also known as the "Hawkins' Zouaves" or the "New York Zouaves."

== Military service, 1861 ==
In April 1861 with the secession of the Southern slave states and the calling up of volunteers by President Abraham Lincoln, Rush C. Hawkins went to Albany, New York, and volunteered the services of a company of New York Zouaves to the state. The governor of New York accepted the offer of the company, and also granted the authorization to Hawkins to raise a regiment of Zouaves. With this authorization in hand he returned to New York City and opened a recruiting office which soon had drawn over 2,000 volunteers, this large number of recruits quickly outgrew the size of the recruiting office.

In early April the regiment moved to its new quarters at Castle Garden in New York City, where on April 23 and 27 the ten companies of the regiment were mustered into state service. After finishing their organization, the regiment was mustered into United States service on May 4, 1861, at Castle Garden by Captain S.B. Hayman of the 7th United States Infantry Regiment. On May 13 the regiment was officially numbered as the Ninth Infantry Regiment of New York Volunteers, by the War Department and New York Adjutant General's office.

On May 15 the regiment boarded a barge that was towed by the steamer Young America and moved from Castle Garden to its new camp on Riker's Island. This camp was designated as Camp Hawkins and the men arrived at the camp around 10 o'clock. It was here that they completed their training and were outfitted with their uniforms, arms, and equipment.

On June 5 the regiment moved from Camp Hawkins and boarded two steamships which took them to the foot of Thirtieth Street along the East River, where they disembarked and marched up 34th Street to Fifth Avenue, proceeding to the home of Mrs. A.W. Griswold where they were presented the national colors. They then moved to the home of Mrs. W.D. Moffatt where they were presented their regimental colors. After these presentations the regiment marched down the Avenue onto Broadway and down to Pier Four on the North River. Here the regiment began boarding the steamer Marion, however it was found that the vessel would not be large enough to hold the entire regiment properly for the trip. With the men and equipment loaded onto the Marion she steamed out to a point between Bedloe's Island and Castle Williams where she dropped anchor for the night. It was during this brief trip that the regiment suffered its first casualty when Albert "Tobe" Warren died after he fell overboard during that afternoon.

The following morning (June 6) the Marion steamed down the river and dropped anchor off of Staten Island to await the arrival of the additional transport required for the regiment. Shortly thereafter the steamer George Peabody arrived and 400 men of the regiment were transferred from the Marion to her. Once this was completed the two vessels set sail for Newport News, Virginia. The regiment served at Newport News from June 8, 1861; Companies C, G and H at Hatteras, North Carolina, from August 27, 1861; and the regiment at Hatteras from September 10, 1861.

A detachment from Company F fought the Skirmish at Smith's Farm on July 5.

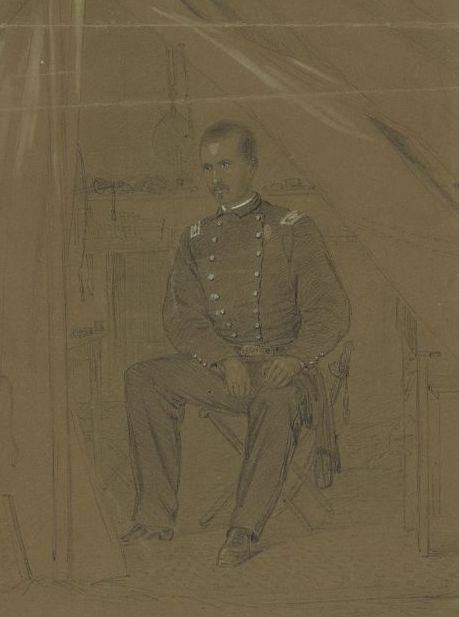
Colonel Rush Hawkins

== Military service, 1862 ==
The regiment served in the 3d Brigade, Burnside's North Carolina Expedition, from January, 1862; at Roanoke Island, from February 3, 1862; in 4th Brigade, Hawkins' Coast Division (3d), 9th Corps, from March, 1862; in the 1st Brigade, 3d Division, 9th Corps, from July, 1862. With Gen. Burnside's force, the regiment arrived at Roanoke Island, early in February and was actively engaged in the battle there, losing 17 members. It participated in an expedition up the Chowan River to Winton; returned to camp on Roanoke Island; was brigaded with the 89th N. Y. and 6th N. H. under Col. Hawkins; was in expeditions to Elizabeth City, and lost 75 men at South Mills. On July 10, the regiment was ordered to Norfolk, Virginia, camped at Newport News, until September 4, when it moved to Washington, D.C., and to Frederick, Maryland, on the 12th. Here it became a part of the Army of the Potomac; was active at South Mountain and Antietam, with a loss in the latter battle of 233 killed, wounded and missing. After camping in detachments at various points, the regiment was concentrated at Fredericksburg, Virginia, participated in the battle there in December.

== Military service, 1863 ==
The regiment camped at Falmouth, Virginia, until Feb. 1, 1863, except Co. F, which had remained as garrison at Plymouth, North Carolina, rejoining the regiment on Jan. 26. In February the 9th was ordered back to Suffolk, where it remained until May, the expiration of its term of service. May 6, 1863, the three years' men of the regiment, which latter had left for New York city, May 3, 1863, were assigned to the 3d Infantry. In April or May, 1863, the War Department authorized Capt. R. H. Morris of this regiment to organize a battery of members of his regiment, whose term of service had not expired. It was to consist of 110 men, but failed to complete its existence; 44 of the men assigned to the proposed battery deserted, the remainder were assigned to the 3d Infantry.

The regiment was mustered out of United States service on May 20, 1863, at New York City, New York, following the expiration of its term of service.

== 9th New York Veteran Volunteers ==
With the mustering out of the 9th Regiment in May 1863, the governor of New York authorized Major Edward Jardine to re-organize them as the 9th New York Veteran Volunteer Infantry Regiment, and appointed Major Jardine as colonel of the newly organizing regiment. After several weeks of recruiting the command was organized into two companies under ex-Hawkins Zouaves officers William Barnett and James B. Horner. The two companies went into camp as a battalion at Fort Hamilton, New York, where training and recruiting was continued.

From July 13 to 16, 1863, the City of New York exploded in several violent riots in reaction to the draft. The two companies were called out to help protect the city. In the ensuing fighting between soldiers and rioters, Colonel Jardine was severely wounded when he was shot in the hip. As a result of this wound, he was taken out of service for several months, and even after returning to the field was only able to perform light duties. The companies of the 9th Veterans acquitted themselves well in the action, and received notice in the reports of Colonel Winslow of the 5th New York Veteran Volunteers.

On October 14, 1863, with the failure of the regiment to fully organize, the companies (under the command of Captain James B. Horner) were ordered to be consolidated into the 17th New York Veteran Volunteer Infantry Regiment, along with the men of the reorganizing 11th Veterans, 38th Veterans, and the "Union Sharpshooters." As such they were mustered into United States service as Company H (Captain James B. Horner) and Company I (Captain William Barnett) of the 17th Veterans. As for Colonel Jardine, he was mustered into service as Lieutenant Colonel of the 17th Veterans.

== Casualties ==
During the regiment's term of service it suffered the following casualties.

- Killed In Action: 2 Officers, 53 Enlisted
- Died of Wounds: 0 Officers, 16 Enlisted
- Died of Disease and other causes: 2 Officers, 27 Enlisted
- Total: 4 Officers and 100 Enlisted

== Commanders ==
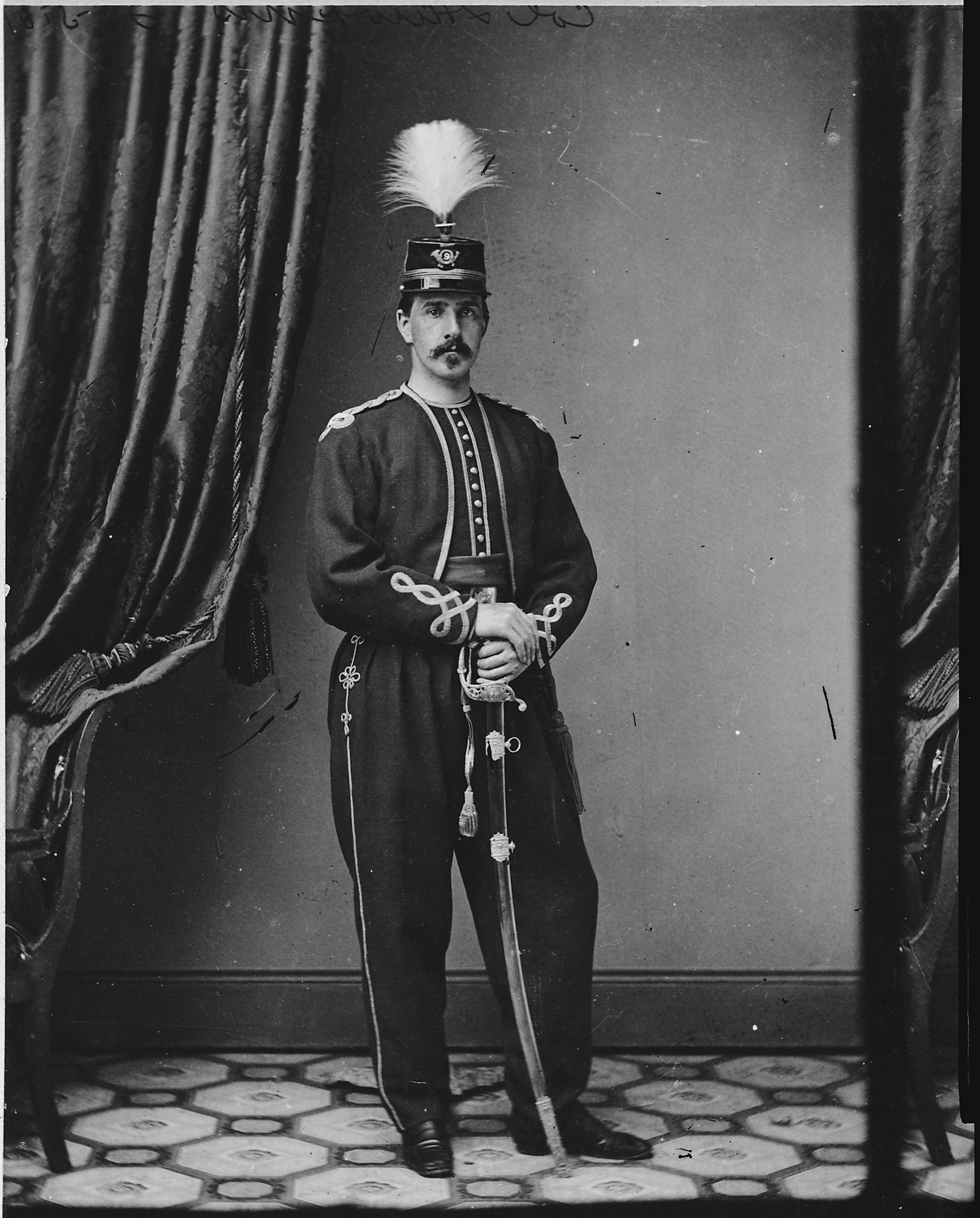
Col. Rush Hawkins in the 9th Hawkins Zouaves uniform

- Colonel Rush Christopher Hawkins (1831–1920)

29 years old. Enrolled on April 23, 1861, at New York City, New York, for two years' service; mustered into service as colonel of the regiment on May 4, 1861, at New York City, New York; on detached service from August 26, 1861; absent, in arrest, from October 22, 1861; absent, in arrest, from November 5, 1861; wounded in action on April 19, 1862, at South Mills near Camden, North Carolina; commanding the 1st Brigade, 3rd Division, 9th Army Corps, in 1862; mustered out of service with the regiment on May 20, 1863, at New York City, New York; brevetted to the rank of brigadier general of United States Volunteers on March 13, 1865, for "gallant and meritorious conduct during the war of the Rebellion." (Commissioned as colonel on June 20, 1861, with rank from May 13th, 1861, original)

- Lieutenant Colonel George Frederick Betts (1827–1898)

34 years old. Enrolled on April 23, 1861, at New York City, New York, for two years' service, at the age of 34; mustered into service as Lieutenant Colonel of the Regiment on May 4, 1861, at New York City, New York; detailed to the regimental recruiting service from July 20, 1861; commanding the regiment from October 22, 1861; resigned his commission and was honorably discharged on February 14, 1862. (Commissioned as lieutenant colonel on June 20, 1861, with rank from May 13, 1861, original.)

- Lieutenant Colonel Edgar Allison Kimball (1822–1863)

38 years old. Appointed as captain of Infantry in the United States Army on March 8, 1847; assigned to the 9th United States Infantry Regiment on April 9, 1847; brevetted to major on August 20, 1847, for his conduct in the Battles of Contreras and Churubusco, Mexico; honorably discharged from service on August 26, 1848, at Fort Adams, Rhode Island. Enrolled on April 23, 1861, at New York City, New York, for two years' service; mustered into service as major of the 9th New York Volunteer Infantry Regiment on May 4, 1861, at New York City, New York; promoted to lieutenant colonel on February 14, 1862; killed by Brigadier General Michael Corcoran, U.S. Volunteers, on April 12, 1863, at Suffolk, Virginia. (Commissioned as a major on June 30, 1861, with rank from May 13th, 1861, original; as lieutenant colonel on February 24, 1862, with rank from February 14th, 1862, vice Lieutenant Colonel Betts had resigned)

- Major Edward Jardine (1828–1893)

31 years old. Enrolled on May 3, 1861, at New York City, New York, for two years' service; mustered into service as captain of Company G of the 9th New York Volunteer Infantry Regiment on May 4, 1861; absent, sick, from December 18, 1861, to January 14, 1862; promoted to major on February 14, 1862; wounded in action on April 19, 1862, at Camden, North Carolina; on a leave of absence in June 1862; commanding the regiment from June 26, 1862; temporarily assigned to command of the 89th New York Volunteer Infantry Regiment in September 1862; detailed as the post provost marshal of Suffolk, Virginia, from February 10, 1863; mustered out of service with the regiment on May 20, 1863, at New York City, New York. (Commissioned as a captain on July 4, 1861, with rank from May 13th, 1861, original; as major on February 24, 1862, with rank from February 14, 1862, vice Major E.A. Kimball was promoted) Appointed as colonel of the 9th New York Veteran Volunteer Infantry Regiment on May 29, 1863, for three years' service; seriously wounded in the thigh by a piece of lead pipe on July 17 (15th), 1863, at First Avenue and Nineteenth Streets in New York City, New York, during the Draft Riots, he was rescued by two young ladies who took him and two others to their home, he later escaped with their help to the home of a nearby surgeon by wearing civilian clothes; mustered out of service on October 14, 1863, at New York City, New York. Enrolled and was mustered into service as lieutenant colonel of the 17th New York Veteran Volunteer Infantry Regiment on October 17, 1863, at Albany, New York, for three years' service; granted a ten-day leave of absence on account of physical disability on May 9, 1864; honorably discharged on May 10, 1864, to accept an appointment. (Commissioned as lieutenant colonel on December 29, 1863, with rank from October 14th, 1863, original) Appointed as captain of the 4th Company of the 2nd Battalion, Veteran Reserve Corps, to date from May 3, 1864; brevetted to the rank of brigadier general of United States Volunteers on November 2, 1865, for "gallant and meritorious services during the War of the Rebellion;" resigned his commission on April 12, 1866.

== Flags ==
In May of 1860 an order by former Colonel Van Buren to produce a set of colors for the regiment, costing around $500. These flags were finished by August of 1861 and were given to them by the members of the city's Council. The regiment carried 3 flags, One was the Stars and Stripes the other was a state flag. It had a blue field with the coat of arms the state in the middle and a scroll above it with the name of the regiment. The third flag had a red field with the National and state coat of arms in the middle with other emblems encircled by a wreath.

== See also ==
- List of New York Civil War regiments
- New York State Military Museum and Veterans Research Center - Civil War - 9th Infantry Regiment History, photographs, historical sketch, table of battles and casualties, Civil War newspaper clippings, and battle flag for the 9th New York Infantry Regiment.
- The Ninth (9th) New York Volunteer Infantry Regiment - Hawkins Zouaves.
- Palmetto Riflemen & New York Zouaves American Civil War Living History / Reenactor Group that portrays the "New York Zouaves".
