= List of Union units from Alabama in the American Civil War =

United States with 35 stars.

This is a list of units from the State of Alabama that fought in the U.S. Army during the American Civil War (1861–1865):

List of Alabama Union Civil War units
Name	Formation Date	Disbandment Date	Location of Formation	Later names/ titles
Cavalry
1st Alabama Cavalry Regiment	October 1862	20 October 1865	Huntsville, Alabama and Memphis, Tennessee	
Infantry
1st Alabama Infantry Regiment (African Descent)	21 May 1863	31 December 1865	Corinth, Mississippi	55th United States Colored Infantry Regiment (from 11 March 1864)
2nd Alabama Infantry Regiment (African Descent)	20 November 1863	25 June 1864	Pulaski, Tennessee	110th United States Colored Infantry Regiment (from 25 June 1864)
3rd Alabama Infantry Regiment (African Descent)	3 January 1864	25 June 1864	Pulaski, Tennessee	111th United States Colored Infantry Regiment (from 25 June 1864)
4th Alabama Infantry Regiment (African Descent)	31 March 1864	7 November 1865	Decatur, Alabama	57th United States Colored Infantry Regiment (from May 16, 1864)
Support
1st Alabama Siege Artillery Regiment (African Descent)	20 June 1863	12 January 1866	La Grange, Tennessee, Lafayette, Tennessee, Memphis, Tennessee, and Corinth, Mississippi	6th United States Colored Heavy Artillery Regiment (from 11 March 1864) Redesignated as 7th on 26th April 1864 Redesignated as 11th United States Coloured Infantry Regiment on 23rd January 1865

== See also ==
- List of American Civil War units by state
- List of Confederate units from Alabama
- Alabama in the American Civil War
- Southern Unionists
- United States Colored Troops
