= Margaret Bingham Stillwell =

American librarian and bibliographer

- Born: January 26, 1887; Providence, Rhode Island, United States
- Died: April 22, 1984 (aged 97); East Greenwich, Rhode Island, United States
- Occupation: bibliographer
- Notable work: Incunabula in American Libraries

Margaret Bingham Stillwell (1887 – 1984) was an American librarian and bibliographer who spent most of her professional career as curator of the Annmary Brown Memorial.

== Education and career ==
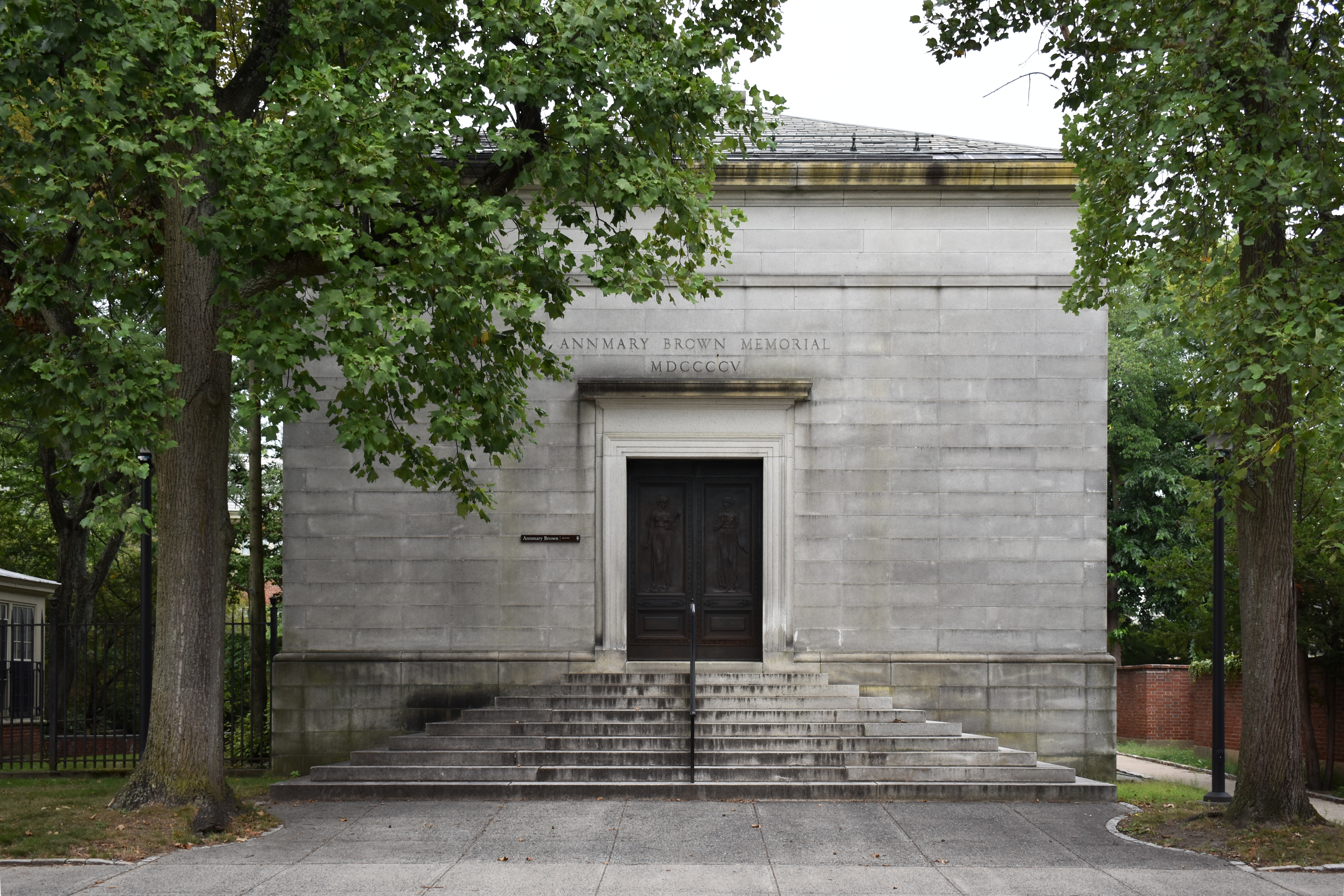
Annmary Brown Memorial Library (Brown University)

Stillwell entered Pembroke College in Brown University in 1905, beginning work at the John Carter Brown Library as a student, and graduated in 1909.

In 1914 she moved to the New York Public Library as a cataloguer of early Americana. There she met Rush Hawkins who had been a Union officer in the American Civil War. Hawkins was an avid collector of incunabula. His wife, Annmary Brown, had died and he established a memorial museum and library to her memory in Providence, Rhode Island. Hawkins recruited Stillwell as curator of the Annmary Brown Memorial Library.

In 1917 Stillwell returned to Providence as curator of the Annmary Brown Memorial Library, where she worked until her retirement in 1953. The library, initially a private collection, was transferred to Brown University in 1948, at which time Stillwell became professor of bibliography. Although she was the first woman appointed to a full professorship at Brown, she never received a full professor's salary.

The John Russell Bartlett Society of Rhode Island's prize for undergraduate book collecting is named after her.

She moved to Greenville, Rhode Island in 1954. She died April 22, 1984.

== Publications ==
Stillwell specialized in the bibliography of incunabula (books printed in the fifteenth century) and her survey Incunabula in American Libraries: A Second Census of Fifteenth-Century Books Owned in the United States, Mexico, and Canada (New York: Bibliographical Society of America, 1940) became known eponymously as Stillwell.

She collaborated with Frederick R. Goff on Hebraica: Incunabula in Hebrew Type Only.

She also wrote The Heritage of the Modern Printer and The Beginning of the World of Books, 1450 to 1470

== Professional activities ==
Stillwell was a member of the Hroswitha Club of American women book collectors, and in 1977 she became the first female honorary member of the Grolier Club.

She was instrumental in establishing a new public library building in Greenville, Rhode Island in 1955.

== Margaret B. Stillwell Legacy Society ==
The Margaret B. Stillwell Legacy Society was established within the Bibliographical Society of America. The Legacy Society ensures the future of bibliographical scholars.

Margaret B. Stillwell's papers are held at Brown University Library.
