= 89th New York Infantry Regiment =

- Active: August 29, 1861 to August 3, 1865
- Country: United States
- Allegiance: Union
- Branch: Infantry
- Nickname(s): Dickinson Guard
- Engagements: Battle of South Mills; Battle of South Mountain; Battle of Antietam; Battle of Fredericksburg; Siege of Suffolk; Battle of Cold Harbor; Siege of Petersburg; Battle of Chaffin's Farm; Battle of Fair Oaks & Darbytown Road; Appomattox Campaign; Third Battle of Petersburg; Battle of Appomattox Court House

The 86th New York Infantry Regiment ("Dickinson Guard") was an infantry regiment in the Union Army during the American Civil War.

== Service ==
The 89th New York Infantry was organized at Elmira, New York beginning August 29, 1861 and mustered in for a three-year enlistment on December 4, 1861 under the command of Colonel Harrison S. Fairchild.

The regiment was attached to Provisional Brigade, Casey's Division, Army of the Potomac, to December 1861. Williams' Brigade, Burnside's North Carolina Expeditionary Corps, to April 1862. 4th Brigade, Department of North Carolina, to July 1862. 1st Brigade, 3rd Division, IX Corps, Army of the Potomac, to April 1863. 1st Brigade, 2nd Division, VII Corps, Department of Virginia, to July 1863. Alvord's Brigade, Vodges' Division, Folly Island, South Carolina, X Corps, Department of the South, to January 1864. 2nd Brigade, Folly Island, South Carolina, Northern District, Department of the South, to February 1864. 2nd Brigade, Gordon's Division, Northern District, Department of the South, to April 1864. 1st Brigade, 2nd Division, X Corps, Army of the James, Department of Virginia and North Carolina, to May 1864. 1st Brigade, 2nd Division, XVIII Corps, to June 1864. 3rd Brigade, 2nd Division, XVIII Corps, to December 1864. 4th Brigade, 1st Division, XXIV Corps, to May 1865. 3rd Brigade, 1st Division, XXIV Corps, to June 1865. 2nd Brigade, 1st Division, XXIV Corps, to August 1865.

The 89th New York Infantry mustered out of service on August 3, 1865.

== Detailed service ==
Left New York for Washington, D.C., December 6, 1861. Duty in the defenses of Washington, D.C., until January 1862. Expedition to Hatteras Inlet, N.C., January 6–13, and duty there until March 2. Moved to Roanoke Island, N.C., March 2, and duty there until June 18. Battle of South Mills April 19. Expedition to New Bern June 18-July 2. Moved to Newport News, Va., July 4–6, then to Aquia Creek and Fredericksburg, Va., August 2–7, and duty there until August 30. Moved to Brooks' Station, then to Washington, D.C., August 31-September 5. Maryland Campaign September 6–22. Battle of South Mountain September 14. Battle of Antietam September 16–17. Duty in Pleasant Valley until October 27. Movement to Falmouth, Va., October 27-November 19. Battle of Fredericksburg, Va., December 12–15. "Mud March" January 20–24, 1863. Moved to Newport News, Va., February 9, then to Norfolk and Suffolk March 14. Siege of Suffolk April 12-May 4. Battery Huger, Hill's Point, April 18–19. Near Suffolk April 19. Providence Church Road May 3. Reconnaissance across the Nansemond May 4. Dix's Peninsula Campaign June 24-July 7. Expedition from White House to South Anna River July 1–7. Ordered to Folly Island, S.C., July. Siege operations against Forts Wagner and Gregg, Morris Island, S.C., and against Fort Sumter and Charleston August 14-September 7. Bombardment of Fort Sumter August 17–23. Capture of Forts Wagner and Gregg September 7. Operations against Charleston and duty on Morris and Folly Islands, S.C., until April 1864. Moved to Gloucester Point, Va., April 1864. Butler's operations on the south side of the James River and against Petersburg and Richmond May 4–28. Occupation of Bermuda Hundred and City Point May 5. Port Walthall May 7. Swift Creek or Arrowfield Church May 9–10. Operations against Fort Darling May 12–16. Battle of Drury's Bluff May 14–16. Bermuda Hundred May 16–27. Move to White House, then to Cold Harbor May 27–31. Battles about Cold Harbor June 1–12. Before Petersburg June 15–18. Siege operations against Petersburg and Richmond June 16, 1864 to April 2, 1865. Mine Explosion, Petersburg, July 30, 1864 (reserve). Duty in trenches before Petersburg and on the Bermuda front until September 27. Battle of Chaffin's Farm, New Market Heights, September 28–30. Battle of Fair Oaks October 27–28. Duty in trenches before Richmond on north side of the James River until March 1865. Moved to Hatcher's Run March 27–28. Appomattox Campaign March 28-April 9. Assault and capture of Forts Gregg and Baldwin and fall of Petersburg April 2. Rice's Station April 6. Appomattox Court House April 9. Surrender of Lee and his army. Duty in the Department of Virginia until August.

== Casualties ==
The regiment lost a total of 254 men during service; 6 officers and 89 enlisted men killed or mortally wounded, 159 enlisted men died of disease.

== Commanders ==
- Colonel Harrison S. Fairchild
- Lieutenant Colonel Theophilus England - commanded during the Siege of Suffolk
- Major Edward Jardine - commanded at the Battle of Antietam
- Major Frank W. Tremain - commanded during the Appomattox Campaign; killed in action at the Third Battle of Petersburg
- Captain William Dobie - commanded during the Appomattox Campaign after Maj Tremain was killed in action

== Notable members ==
- Sergeant George McKee, Company D - Medal of Honor recipient for action at the Third Battle of Petersburg

== See also ==
- List of New York Civil War regiments
- New York in the Civil War
