= 40th United States Colored Infantry Regiment =

40th United States Colored Infantry
- Active: February 29, 1864 - April 25, 1866
- Country: United States
- Allegiance: Union
- Branch: Infantry

The 40th United States Colored Infantry was an infantry regiment that served in the Union Army during the American Civil War. The regiment was composed of African American enlisted men commanded by white officers and was authorized by the Bureau of Colored Troops which was created by the United States War Department on May 22, 1863.

== Service ==
The 40th U.S. Colored Infantry was organized in Nashville, Tennessee beginning February 29, 1864 for three-year service under the command of Colonel R. K. Crawford.

The regiment was attached to Defenses of Louisville & Nashville Railroad, Department of the Cumberland, to June 1864. Defenses of Nashville & Northwestern Railroad, Department of the Cumberland, to December 1864. Defenses of Louisville & Nashville Railroad, Department of the Cumberland, to April 1865. 2nd Brigade, 4th Division, District of East Tennessee, Department of the Cumberland, to July 1865. 1st Brigade, 4th Division, District of East Tennessee, to August 1865. Department of the Tennessee to April 1866.

The regiment served as railroad guard duty during its entire term of service along the Nashville & Louisville Railroad and Nashville & Northwestern Railroad. It saw action in a skirmish at South Tunnel, Tennessee, on October 10, 1864.

The 40th U.S. Colored Infantry mustered out of service April 25, 1866.

== Commanders ==
- Colonel R. K. Crawford
- Colonel Frederick W. Lister

== See also ==
- List of United States Colored Troops Civil War Units
- United States Colored Troops
