= 17th New York Infantry Regiment =

- Active: May 14, 1861 – June 2, 1863
- Country: United States
- Allegiance: Union
- Branch: Infantry
- Engagements: Peninsula Campaign; Siege of Yorktown; Battle of Hanover Court House; Seven Days Battles; Second Battle of Bull Run; Battle of Antietam; Battle of Fredericksburg; Battle of Chancellorsville

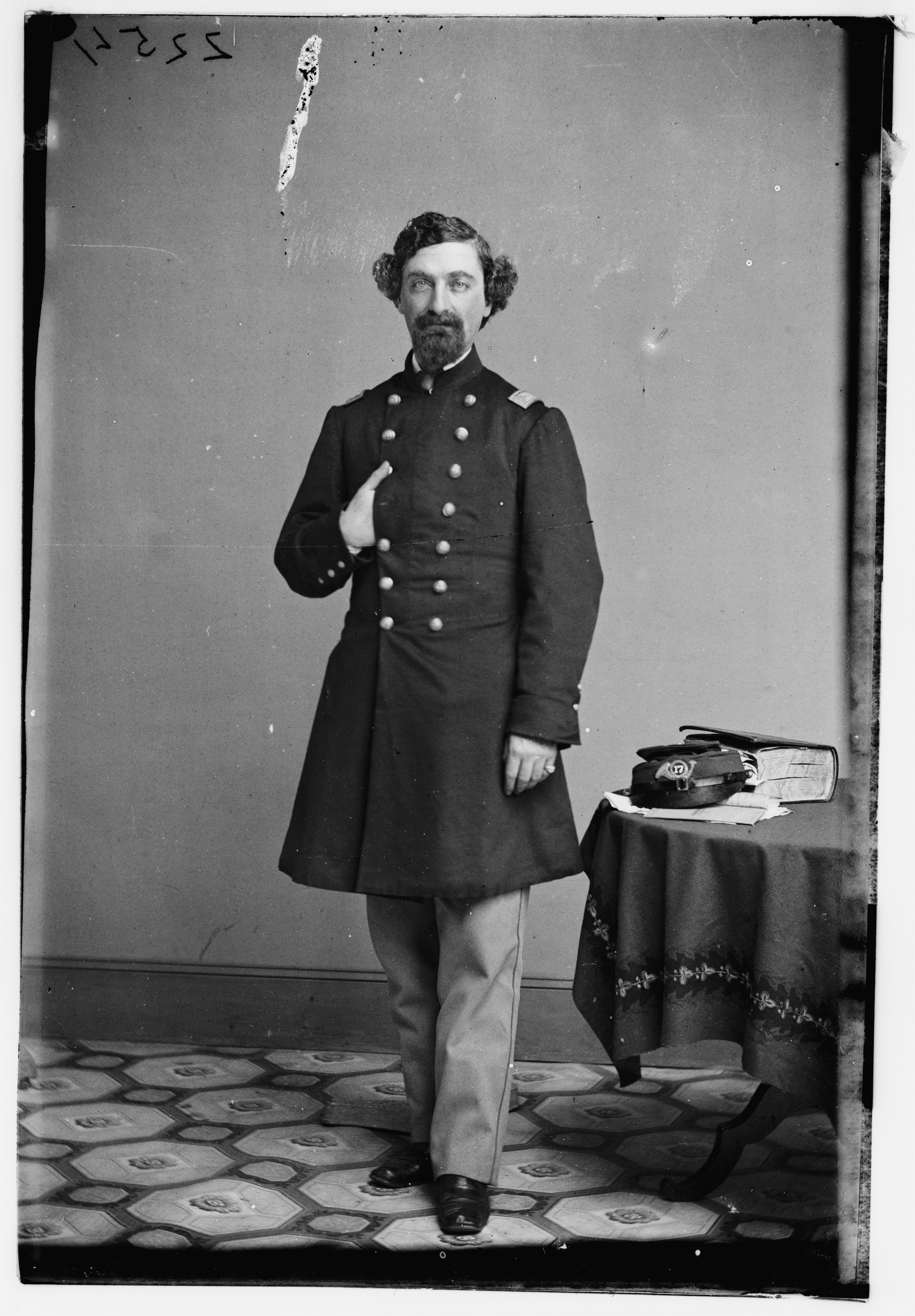
Maj. C. A. Johnson, 17th N.Y.Inf.

The 17th New York Infantry Regiment ("Westchester Chasseurs") was an infantry regiment in the Union Army during the American Civil War. It was recruited heavily from New York's Westchester County, and nicknamed "Chasseurs" (French for hunters/riflemen) to reflect their specialized light infantry role; the French term was popular in the 19th century for light infantry units known for skirmishing and mobility.

== Service ==
The 17th New York Infantry was organized May 14, 1861, at New York City, New York and mustered in on May 28, 1861, for two years' service under the command of Colonel Henry Seymour Lansing.

The regiment was attached to Mansfield's Command, Department of Washington, June to August 1861. Garrison, Fort Ellsworth, Defenses of Washington, D.C. to October 1861. Butterfield's Brigade, Porter's Division, Army of the Potomac, to March 1862. 3rd Brigade, 1st Division, III Corps, Army of the Potomac, to May 1862. 3rd Brigade, 1st Division, V Corps, to June 1863.

Men who enlisted for three years' service were detached on May 13, 1863, assigned to a battalion of New York volunteers, and eventually transferred to the 146th New York Volunteer Infantry. The 17th New York Infantry mustered out of the service on June 2, 1863. Reenlisting veterans of the 17th and of three other New York regiments formed the 17th New York Veteran Infantry Regiment under command of Colonel William T. C. Grower.

== Detailed service ==
Left New York for Washington, D.C., June 21. Duty in the defenses of Washington, D.C., until March 1862. Advance on Manassas, Va., March 10–15, 1862. Moved to the Peninsula, Va., March 22–24. Peninsula Campaign March to August. Warwick Road April 5. Siege of Yorktown April 5-May 4. Reconnaissance up the Pamunkey May 10. Battle of Hanover Court House May 27. Operations about Hanover Court House May 27–29. Seven days before Richmond June 25-July 1. Operations about White House Landing June 26-July 2. White House June 28. Duty at Harrison's Landing until August 16. Movement to Fort Monroe, then to Centreville August 16–28. Pope's Campaign in northern Virginia August 28-September 2. Second Battle of Bull Run August 30. Maryland Campaign September 6–22. Battle of Antietam September 16–17. Shepherdstown September 19. Duty at Sharpsburg, Md., until October 30. Movement to Falmouth, Va., October 30-November 17. Battle of Fredericksburg, Va., December 12–15. Expedition to Richards' and Ellis' Fords, Rappahannock River, December 29–30. "Mud March" January 20–24, 1863. At Falmouth until April 27. Chancellorsville Campaign April 27-May 6. Battle of Chancellorsville May 1–5.

According to Brigader General Daniel Butterfield, the 17th distinguished themselves honorably at the Battle of Hanover Court House. They along with the rest of the Third Brigade "charged the enemy and drove him back, capturing one of his cannon with caisson and ammunition complete. They additionally routed Confederate forces as they pursued them by a railroad close to the Hanover Court House. Butterfield recalled his brigade "capturing many prisoners, in fact encumbered ourselves with them..." In total 225 prisoners were captured in this battle. Praise was given to Lieutenant John Burliegh of Yonkers by Butterfield for his pursuit of the enemy.

At the Second Battle of Run, the 17th fought bravely but suffered high casualties. Major William T.C. Grower of the 17th reported that he "gave the word double-quick, charge, and with a mad yell the gallant fellows rushed up the hill to what was almost certain death." They charged up a plateau but not able to go any further. Canister and rifle smashed through their ranks from two different directions. Major Grower was wounded but he was fortunate enough to survive. Other officers were killed in action trying to rally their men. "Captains Deinerest and Blauvelt were shot dead while nobly cheering on their men." The 17th held the plateau for approximately fifteen minutes before they retreated. In total, 11 officers and 200 were casualties in this engagement. Three officers and twenty-four men were killed in action.

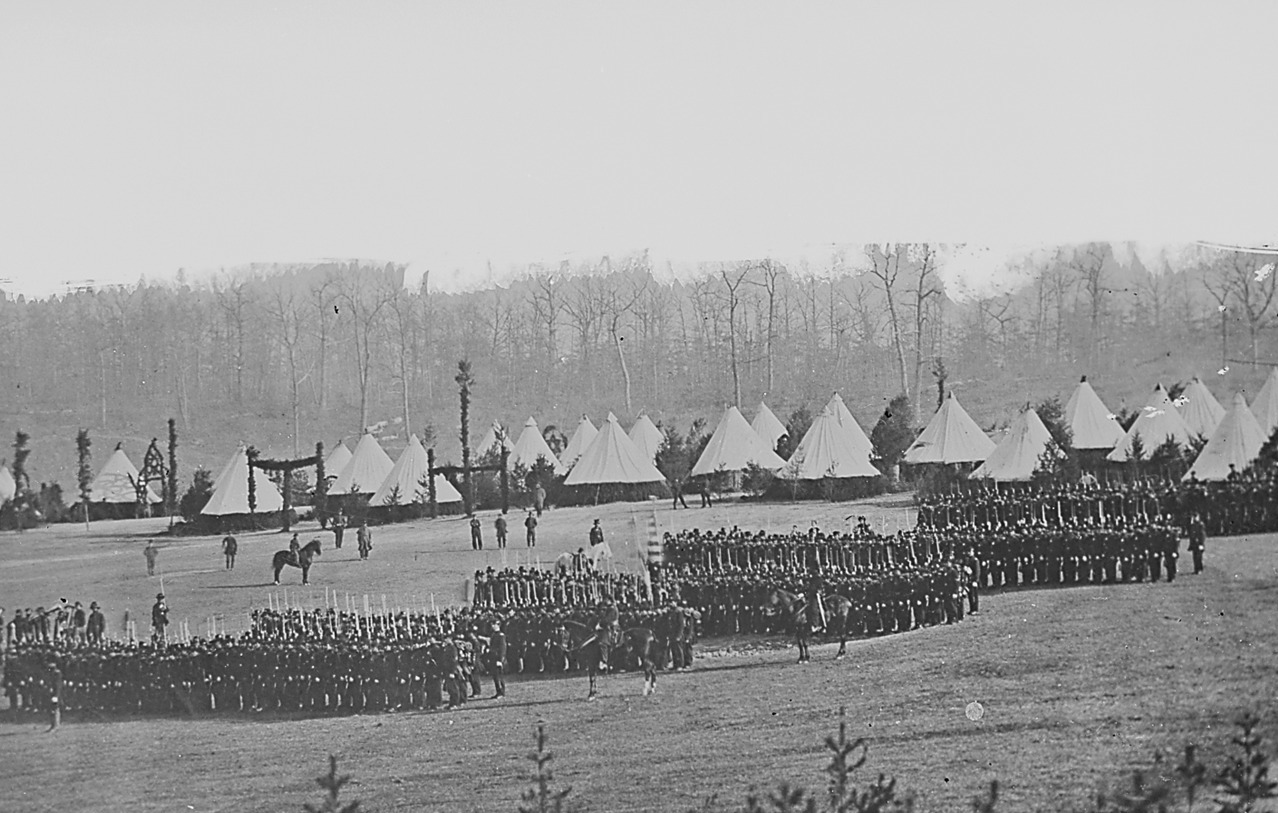
17th New York Infantry on parade

== Casualties ==
The regiment lost a total of 77 men during service; 5 officers and 32 enlisted men killed or mortally wounded, 3 officers and 37 enlisted men died of disease.

== Commanders ==
- Colonel Henry Seymour Lansing
- Lieutenant Colonel Nelson B. Bartram Led the Regiment at Antietam.

== See also ==
- List of New York Civil War regiments
- New York in the Civil War
