= Thomas Jefferson Morgan =

American Brevet Brigadier General (1839–1902)

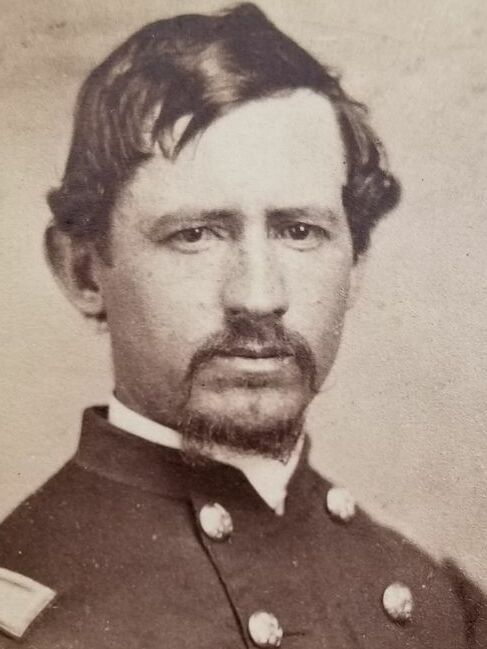

25th Commissioner of Indian Affairs
- In office 1889–1893
- President: Benjamin Harrison
- Preceded by: John Henry Oberly
- Succeeded by: Daniel M. Browning

Personal details
- Born: August 17, 1839 Franklin, Indiana, U.S.
- Died: July 13, 1902 (aged 62) Ossining, New York, U.S.
- Education: Franklin College
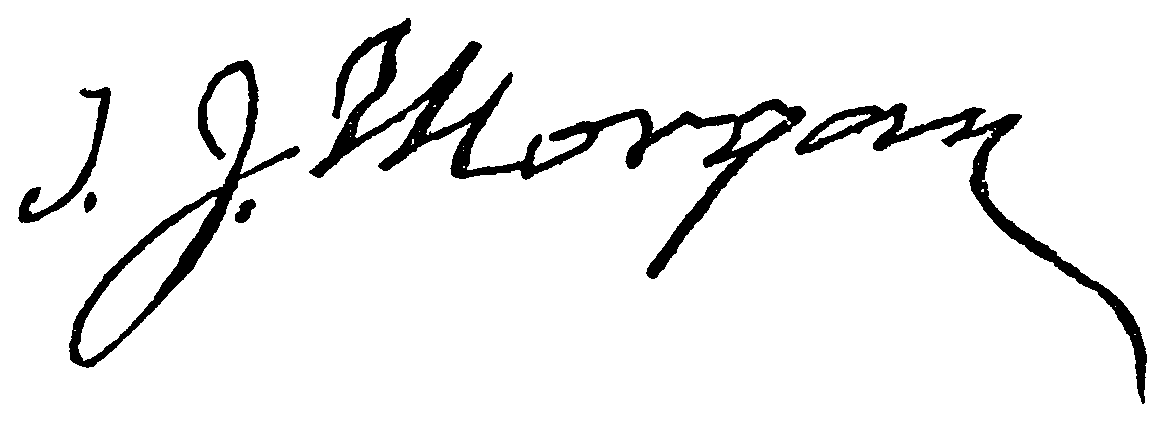
- Signature

Military service
- Allegiance: United States (Union)
- Branch: United States Army (Union Army)
- Years of service: 1861; 1862 – 1865
- Rank: Colonel; Bvt. Brigadier General
- Unit: 7th Indiana Infantry Regiment
- Commands: 14th United States Colored Infantry Regiment
- Battles/wars: American Civil War: Franklin–Nashville campaign; Battle of Nashville; Atlanta campaign

Thomas Jefferson Morgan was an American Brevet Brigadier General during the American Civil War. He commanded the 14th United States Colored Infantry Regiment throughout the middle and end of the war. Later on, he became a prominent member of the Rochester Theological Seminary and would go on to be a prominent teaching figure across the United States. His works were renowned across the education world and managed to become vice president of the National Education Association from 1887 to 1889 and the Commissioner of Indian Affairs from 1889 to 1893.

== American Civil War ==
Thomas was born on August 17, 1839, at Franklin, Indiana. After graduating from the college, Morgan immediately enlisted in the 7th Indiana Infantry Regiment for around three months before his tenure expired and temporarily became a teacher at Atlanta, Illinois.

Morgan re-enlisted in the Union Army on August 1, 1862, as a First Lieutenant of the 70th Indiana Infantry Regiment but then organized to be the Lieutenant Colonel of the 14th United States Colored Infantry Regiment on November 1, 1863. After being promoted to Colonel on New Years of 1864, he organized 2 other regiments took command of the First Colored Brigade of the Army of the Cumberland. He went on to participate at the Atlanta campaign as well as the Battle of Nashville while being in the general staff of Oliver Otis Howard.

Morgan was brevetted Brigadier General on March 13, 1865, before resigning on April 1, 1865.

== Post-War Career ==
After the war, Morgan attended the Rochester Theological Seminary. In 1869, he was made Baptist minister and served as the Corresponding Secretary for the New York Union for Ministerial Union and became a pastor at Brownville, Nebraska in the following year. In 1872, he became the principal of the Nebraska State Normal School before later on, took similar positions at the Potsdam Normal School and the Rhode Island State Normal School. After the election of Benjamin Harrison, Morgan was a member of the Anti-Catholic League for the Protection of American Institutions and for the remaining years of his life, advocated for the American Protective Association.

In 1889 newly elected President Benjamin Harrison appointed Morgan the Commissioner of Indian Affairs in 1889 in order to promote education for Native Americans. Morgan had a national reputation in education; he was vice president of the National Education Association. Morgan viewed education as a quick path to for Native Americans to learn how to fit into the mainstream society. To become civilized according to American standards an Indian youth had to learn new habits of dress, belief, and behavior. Morgan wanted government schools to provide the training needed.

Morgan was also an advocate for Chinese immigration in the United States, actively protesting the legislation for discriminating against Chinese immigrants. He resigned in 1893 to become the secretary of the Home Mission society as well as founding the Delta Chapter of Phi Delta Theta fraternity in Franklin College. After his death on July 13, 1902, he was buried at Mount Hope Cemetery, Rochester, New York.

== See also ==
- List of American Civil War brevet generals (Union)
- Bureau of Indian Affairs
