= 14th United States Colored Infantry Regiment =

- Active: November 16, 1863 - March 26, 1866
- Country: United States
- Allegiance: Union
- Branch: Infantry
- Engagements: American Civil War: Second Battle of Dalton; Battle of Decatur; Battle of Nashville

The 14th United States Colored Infantry Regiment was an infantry regiment that served in the Union Army during the American Civil War. The regiment was composed of African American enlisted men commanded by white officers and was authorized by the Bureau of Colored Troops which was created by the United States War Department on May 22, 1863.

== Service ==
The 14th U.S. Colored Infantry was organized at Camp Stanton in Gallatin, Tennessee beginning November 16, 1863 and mustered in for three-year service under the command of Colonel Thomas Jefferson Morgan. (Note: Later on, he became a prominent member of the Rochester Theological Seminary and would go on to be a prominent teaching figure across the United States. His works were renowned across the education world and managed to become vice president of the National Education Association from 1887 to 1889. Morgan was a member of the Anti-Catholic League for the Protection of American Institutions and for the remaining years of his life, advocated for the American Protective Association and the Commissioner of Indian Affairs from 1889 to 1893. Morgan was made the Commissioner of Indian Affairs in 1889 in order to promote education within Native Americans. He viewed education on Native Americans as an easy way for them to fit into society and that the system itself can be improved with one generation.) The unit was described in the report of the Pennsylvania association for the relief of East Tennessee in 1864: "At Chattanooga we saw a negro regiment, the 14th U. S. C. T., Col. T. J. Morgan, of Indiana, commanding. It had been raised in Gallatin, Tennessee, 'a regular secession hole,' as it was described to us, and numbered 950 men, every one of whom, save eight, had been a slave. Their camp was the cleanest we had ever seen, and their appearance and drill unsurpassed. The colonel has full confidence in their fighting qualities, and one of the captains remarked that they could not fail in action with such stuff as their men are made of. The chaplain teaches them three hours a day, and many can read and write. The sight of that regiment on dress parade, with every head bare to heaven as the chaplain lifted up his voice and prayed that they might be strong and quit themselves like men in the day of battle, was one never to be forgotten. Adjoining their camp was that of the 42d U.S. C. T., a regiment now forming and containing about 150 men. The contrast between the slouching gait and slovenly appearance of the raw recruits, some of whom still had on their plantation clothes, and the soldierly bearing of the disciplined men, was very marked."

The regiment was attached to Post of Gallatin, Tennessee, to January 1864. Post of Chattanooga, Tennessee, Department of the Cumberland, to November 1864. Unattached, District of the Etowah, Department of the Cumberland, to December 1864. 1st Colored Brigade, District of the Etowah, to May 1865. District of East Tennessee, to August 1865. Department of the Tennessee and Department of Georgia until March 1866.

The men of the 14th were involved in fighting at Dalton, Georgia (August 15, 1864). Company B was on the skirmish line. Following the fight, Col. Morgan noted that the "regiment had been recognized as soldiers . . . After the fight, as we marched into town through a pouring rain, a white regiment standing at rest, swung their hats and gave three rousing cheers for the 14th Colored..." On September 27, 1864, the regiment saw action at Pulaski, Tennessee.

Next, the 14th USCI was involved in the Siege of Decatur, Alabama (October 27–28, 1864). Again, their performance was recognized: "As we marched inside the works, the white soldiers, who had watched the maneuver, gave us three rousing cheers." Due to these experiences, the 14th was not as green as some historians have written. In late November, MGEN Thomas pulled the regiment from Chattanooga to Nashville as part of his gathering of his army in response to Hood's invasion of Tennessee.

On Thursday, December 15, 1864, the 14th fought alongside many other regiments of black and white soldiers in storming and eventually taking the Confederate right flank. The next day, the battle continued and they helped defeat the Confederate Army of Tennessee. They pursued JohnBell Hood's Army back through Franklin and Williamson County - where some of the members had lived before the War. As Col. Morgan described:

"When General Thomas rode over the battle-field and saw the bodies of colored men side by side with the foremost, on the very works of the enemy, he turned to his staff, saying: 'Gentlemen, the question in settled; negroes will fight.' ... After the great victory, we joined in the chase after the fleeing foe. Hood's army was whipped, demoralized, and pretty badly scattered. A good many stragglers were picked up. ... After we had passed through Franklin, we had orders to turn about and return to that city. I was riding at the head of the column, followed by my own regiment. The men were swinging along, "arms at will," when they spied General Thomas and staff* approaching. Without orders they brought their arms to 'right shoulder shift,' took the step, and striking up their favorite tune of 'John Brown,' whistled it with admirable effect while passing the General, greatly to his amusement. "

The 14th U.S. Colored Infantry mustered out of service March 26, 1866.

== Commanders ==
- Colonel Thomas Jefferson Morgan
- Lieutenant Colonel Henry Clark Corbin

== Affiliations, battle honors, detailed service, and casualties ==
=== Organizational affiliation ===
Attached to:

- Attached to Post of Gallatin, TN, to January, 1864.
- Post of Chattanooga, TN, Dept. of the Cumberland, to November, 1864.
- COL Thomas J. Morgan's 1st Colored Brigade, U.S.C.T. Division, MGEN James B. Steedman's Provisional Detachment (District of the Etowah), Dept. of the Cumberland, to December, 1864.
- 1st Colored Brigade, District of the Etowah, to May, 1865.
- 1st Colored Brigade, District of East Tennessee, to August, 1865.
- 1st Colored Brigade, Dept. of the Tennessee and Dept. of Georgia till March, 1866.

=== List of battles ===
The official list of battles in which the regiment bore a part:

- Second Battle of Dalton
- Battle of Decatur
- Battle of Nashville

=== Detailed service ===
==== 1864 ====
- Garrison duty at Chattanooga, Tenn., till November, 1864.
- March to relief of Dalton, Ga., August 14.
- Action at Dalton August 14–15.
- Siege of Decatur, Ala., October 27–30.
- Battle of Nashville, Tenn., December 15–16.
- Overton's Hill December 16.
- Pursuit of Hood to the Tennessee River December 17–28.

==== 1865 ====
- Duty at Chattanooga and in District of East Tennessee till July, 1865.
- At Greenville and in the Dept. of the Tennessee till March, 1866.
- Mustered out March 26, 1866.

== See also ==
- List of United States Colored Troops Civil War Units
- United States Colored Troops
