= Battle of Nashville =

Major battle of the American Civil War

- Part of the American Civil War
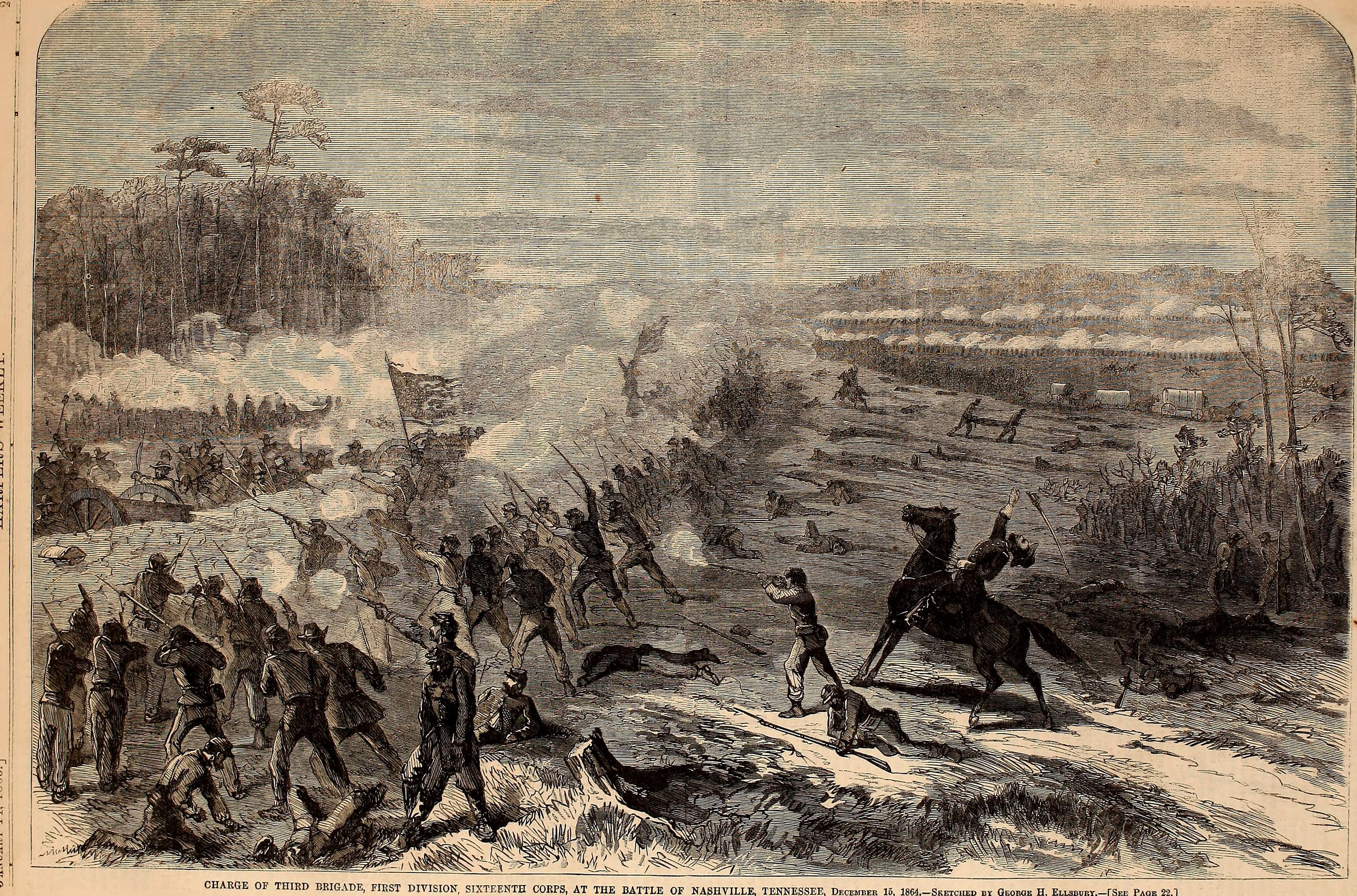
- 3rd brigade, 1st division of the XVI Corps attacking the Rebel line, published in Harper's Weekly
Date	December 15–16, 1864
Location	Nashville, Tennessee, U.S. 36.0881°N 86.8098°W
Result	Union victory: End of the Army of Tennessee as an effective fighting force

Belligerents
United States	(Confederate States of America) Confederate States

Commanders and leaders
George H. Thomas	John Bell Hood

Units involved
Army of the Cumberland (Dept. of the Cumberland): IV Corps; XXIII Corps; Detachment of Army of the Tennessee (Note: The XVI Corps was redesignated with this unusual name on December 6.); District of the Etowah; Cavalry Corps	Army of Tennessee

Strength
55,000	22,000–30,000

Casualties and losses
3,061 (387 killed 2,558 wounded 112 missing/captured)	~6,000 (1,500 killed/wounded 4,500 missing/captured, several batteries captured by Union forces)

The Battle of Nashville was a two-day battle in the Franklin–Nashville campaign that represented the end of large-scale fighting west of the coastal states in the American Civil War. It was fought at Nashville, Tennessee, on December 15–16, 1864, between the Confederate Army of Tennessee under Lieutenant General John Bell Hood and the Union Army of the Cumberland (Dept. of the Cumberland) (AoC) under Major General George H. Thomas. In one of the largest victories achieved by the Union army during the war, Thomas attacked and routed Hood's army, largely destroying it as an effective fighting force. (Note: Historians have cited the Lost Cause as a major factor in the battle's neglect in comparison to Franklin and Spring Hill because the Lost Cause tried to portray Hood's 1864 invasion of Tennessee as the ultimate tragedy of the Confederacy in the west. In so doing, U.S. leadership and its troops' competence had to be downplayed.)

== Military situation ==
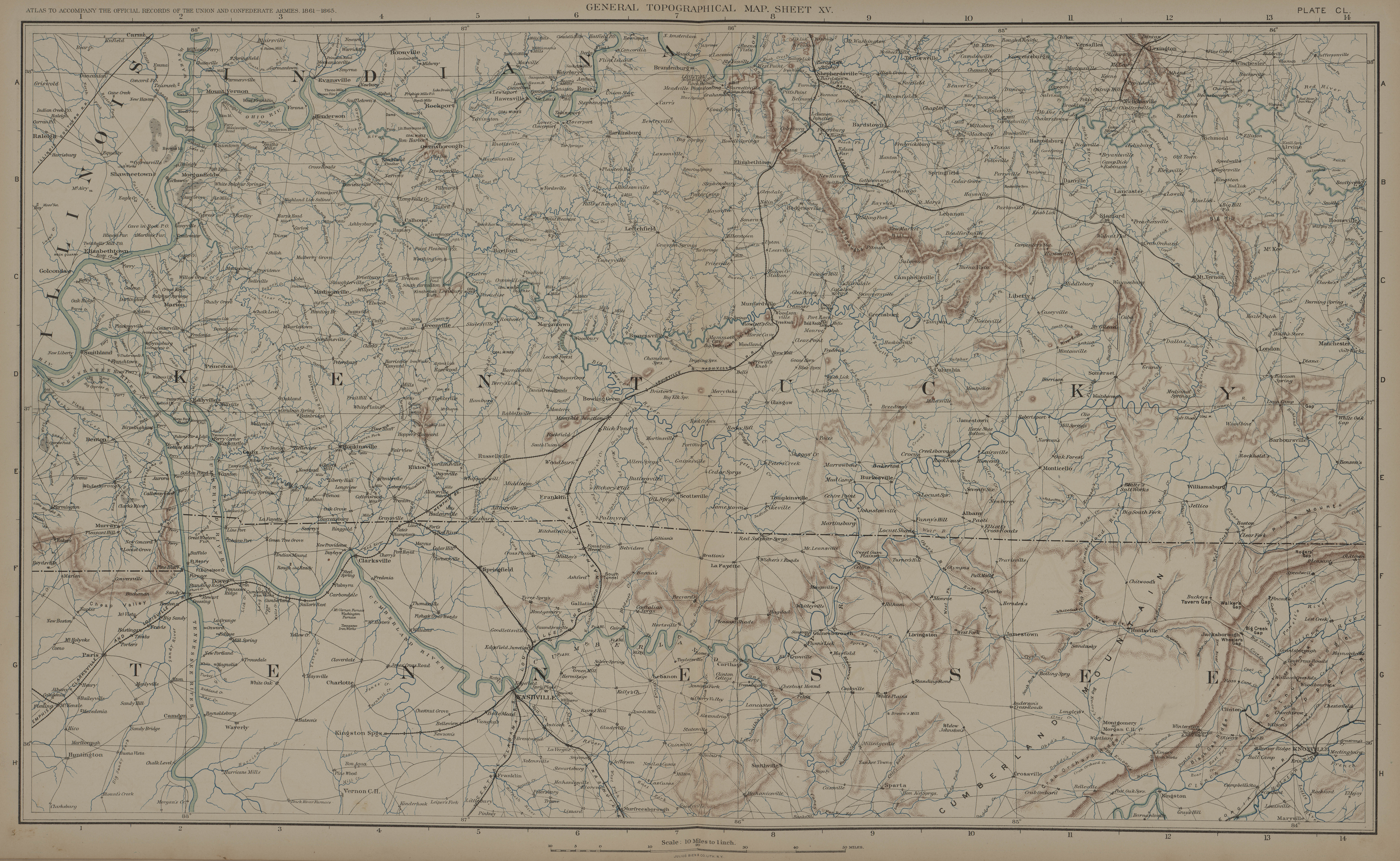
Kentucky-Northern Tennessee, 1864.

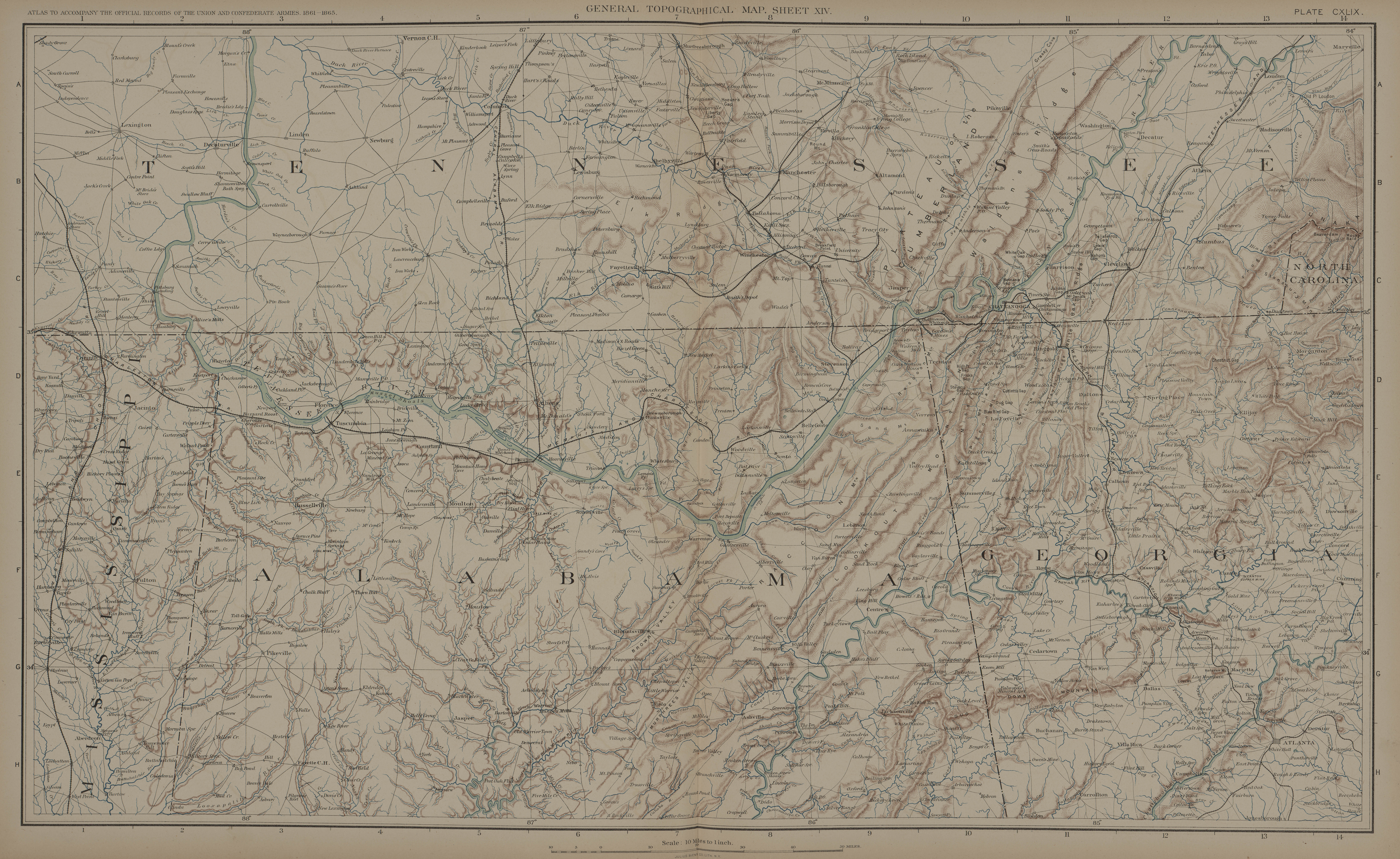
Southern Tennessee-Alabama, 1864.

Map of the Franklin–Nashville Campaign Confederate Union

Hood followed up his defeat in the Atlanta campaign by moving northwest to disrupt the supply lines of Maj. Gen. William T. Sherman from Chattanooga, hoping to challenge Sherman into a battle that could be fought to Hood's advantage. After a brief period in which he pursued Hood, Sherman decided instead to cut his main army off from these lines and "live off the land" in his famed March to the Sea from Atlanta to Savannah. By doing so, he would avoid having to defend hundreds of miles of supply lines against constant raids, through which he predicted he would lose "a thousand men monthly and gain no result" against Hood's army. Sherman disengaged and turned east, leaving the matter of Hood's army and the defense of Tennessee to Thomas (Note: Sherman had wanted to take Thomas with him but sent him to Nashville at the insistence of the War Department. Thomas arrived in Nashville on October 3, 1864, and took charge of all the U.S. forces troops in Tennessee.). Hood devised a plan to march into Tennessee and defeat Thomas's force while it was geographically divided. He pursued Maj. Gen. John M. Schofield's army from Pulaski to Columbia and then attempted to intercept and destroy it at Spring Hill. Schofield had been tasked by Thomas with delaying Hood as much as possible, without losing his army, while Thomas pulled in his forces to concentrate at Nashville. Because of a series of Confederate command miscommunications and solid U.S. Army leadership in the Battle of Spring Hill (November 29, 1864), Schofield was able to withdraw from Columbia and slip past Hood's army at Spring Hill relatively unscathed.

Furious at his failure at Spring Hill, Hood pursued Schofield to the north and encountered the Union at Franklin behind strong fortifications. In the Battle of Franklin on November 30, Hood ordered almost 31,000 of his men to assault the Union works before Schofield could withdraw across the Harpeth River and escape to Nashville. Schofield and his men were intent on getting across the Harpeth and did not expect Hood and his army to attack; the fact that they did attack with such ferocity soon made the U.S. troops realize that they had changed from a delaying action to a desperate fight for survival. The Union soldiers repulsed multiple assaults and inflicted over 6,000 casualties on the Confederates, (Note: Schofield estimated 1,750 killed, 3,800 wounded, 702 missing/captured. Hood actually considered the battle a victory and reported significantly lower casualties: "Our loss in killed, wounded, and prisoners was 4,500." Per Foard: "During the month of November: Killed, 1089; wounded, 3131; total, 4220. These casualties include the bloody battle of Franklin, Tenn., fought, November 30, 1864.") which included a large number of key Confederate generals, doing heavy damage to the leadership of the Army of Tennessee.

Schofield withdrew from Franklin during the night and marched into the defensive works of Nashville on December 1, there coming under the command of Thomas, who now had a combined force of approximately 55,000 men. By and large, his troops were veterans, the IV Corps under Brig. Gen. Thomas J. Wood and Schofield's XXIII Corps having fought in the Atlanta campaign and Maj. Gen. Andrew J. Smith's "Detachment of the Army of the Tennessee" (a part of the recently discontinued XVI Corps had been redesignated with this unusual name on December 6) having fought at Vicksburg, in the Red River Campaign, at Tupelo against S.D. Lee and Nathan Bedford Forrest, and in Missouri against Sterling Price. While Wilson's cavalry had combat experience, most of it had been of the wrong kind at the hands of Nathan Bedford Forrest, John Hunt Morgan, or Joe Wheeler. Only Maj. Gen. James B. Steedman's Division lacked experience fighting together. It was composed of garrison troops and railroad guards from Tennessee and Georgia and included eight regiments of United States Colored Troops. (Note: Bobrick notes that despite the actions of black soldiers during the preceding year in Virginia and South Carolina, and at Port Hudson, black soldiers had not been used in the front lines nor in attack in Tennessee. Thomas' placing them in his defensive lines was considered daring by some of his army.)

Union forces had been constructing defensive works around Nashville since the time the city was occupied in February 1862. (Note: In February 1862, U.S. forces captured Nashville, the first Rebel state capital to fall. A commercial, industrial and social centerpiece of the region, its loss took with it all of the upper South, especially resource-rich Middle Tennessee, with the rest of the state following by the end of 1863. Control of rivers, railroads, farms, factories, and population centers gave the U.S. Army and Navy the avenues to project power into the heart of the Confederacy. Over the next two years, Rebels failed to regain lost ground. The Rebel national vision saw its northern frontier on the Ohio. Although an impossibility, the Rebels kept trying. Perryville, in 1862, Stones River, at the 1862-1863 new year, and then Hood's 1864 invasion were all in support of that vision.) By 1864, a 7-mile-long semicircular Union defensive line on the south and west sides of the city protected Nashville from attacks from those directions. The line was studded with forts, the largest being Fort Negley. The trench line was extended to the west after December 1. The Cumberland River formed a natural defensive barrier on the north and east sides of the city. Smith's troops had arrived by river on November 30, and their transports had been escorted by a powerful fleet of tinclad and ironclad gunboats. Thus, the river barrier was well-defended.

From east to west the defensive line was manned by Steedman's division, the XXIII Corps, the IV Corps, and Smith's XVI Corps Detachment. During the amassing of his forces and the construction of his defenses, Thomas' troops punctuated their entrenching with small offensive operations and raids. (Note: On the left, Steedman’s troops assaulted the nearest Confederates on Monday morning, 5 December. Colonel Morgan’s 1st Colored Brigade—the 14th, 16th, 17th, and 44th USCIs and three companies of the 18th USCI—and the veteran 68th Indiana and 18th Ohio Veteran Infantry attacked Rebels opposite their position taking prisoners and scattering the rest. On December 7, Wednesday, the enemy returned, Morgan’s troops drove them off again. The 14th's chaplain, William Elgin, wrote “In this, as in the other affair, the Colored Troops did as well as any Troops could do. The movement was witnessed by a great many soldiers and citizens all of whom speak in the highest praise of theconduct of the Col[ored] Troops. For our part we feel proud of the command.”)Given the fact that the Union army was composed of troops from the Army of the Cumberland, the Army of the Ohio, the Army of the Tennessee, the District of Etowah, and the Post of Nashville, the force in Nashville had no official name.

Hood's Army of Tennessee arrived south of the city on December 2 and took up positions facing the Union forces within the city. As he was not nearly strong enough to assault the Union fortifications, Hood opted for the defensive. Rather than repeating his fruitless frontal attack at Franklin, he entrenched and waited, hoping that Thomas would attack him. Then, after Thomas had smashed his army against the Confederate entrenchments, Hood could counterattack and take Nashville.

The Confederate line of about four miles of fortifications faced the southerly facing portion of the Union line (the part occupied by Steedman and Schofield). From right to left were the corps of Maj. Gen. Benjamin F. Cheatham, Lt. Gen. Stephen D. Lee, and Lt. Gen. Alexander P. Stewart. Cavalry commanded by Brig. Gen. James R. Chalmers was off to the southwest of the city. The Confederate left flank was secured by five small detached redoubts, each having two to four guns with garrisons of about 150 men each. The weather turned cold and many Confederate soldiers took shelter in simple pits which were just big enough for two or three men to sleep alongside each other with a small fire at one end. Alabama soldier Edgar Jones wrote that while he enjoyed the warmth of his new home it gave him "a sort of graveyard feeling" since the shelters were remarkably similar to graves.

Hood made a serious strategic error before the battle. On December 2, he sent the three brigades of William B. Bate's Division of Cheatham's Corps to attack the Nashville & Chattanooga Railroad between Nashville and Murfreesboro as well as the Union garrison in the latter city. Three days later, he sent an additional two brigades of infantry and two divisions of cavalry, all under Forrest's command, to reinforce Bate. Hood believed this diversion would draw Thomas out of the Nashville fortifications, allowing Hood to either defeat Thomas in detail or to seize Nashville by a coup de main once its garrison was depleted. While the railroad between Nashville and Murfreesboro was broken in a number of places, the Murfreesboro garrison drove off the Confederates in the Third Battle of Murfreesboro (also called the Battle of the Cedars) on December 7. Furthermore, Thomas was not fooled by this diversion, and remained in his fortifications until he was ready to attack on his own terms. Bate's Division and one of the two attached infantry brigades returned to Nashville, but Hood had seriously diminished his already outnumbered forces, and he had also deprived his army of its strongest and most mobile unit, Forrest and his cavalry.

== Opposing forces ==
=== Union ===
Principal Union commanders
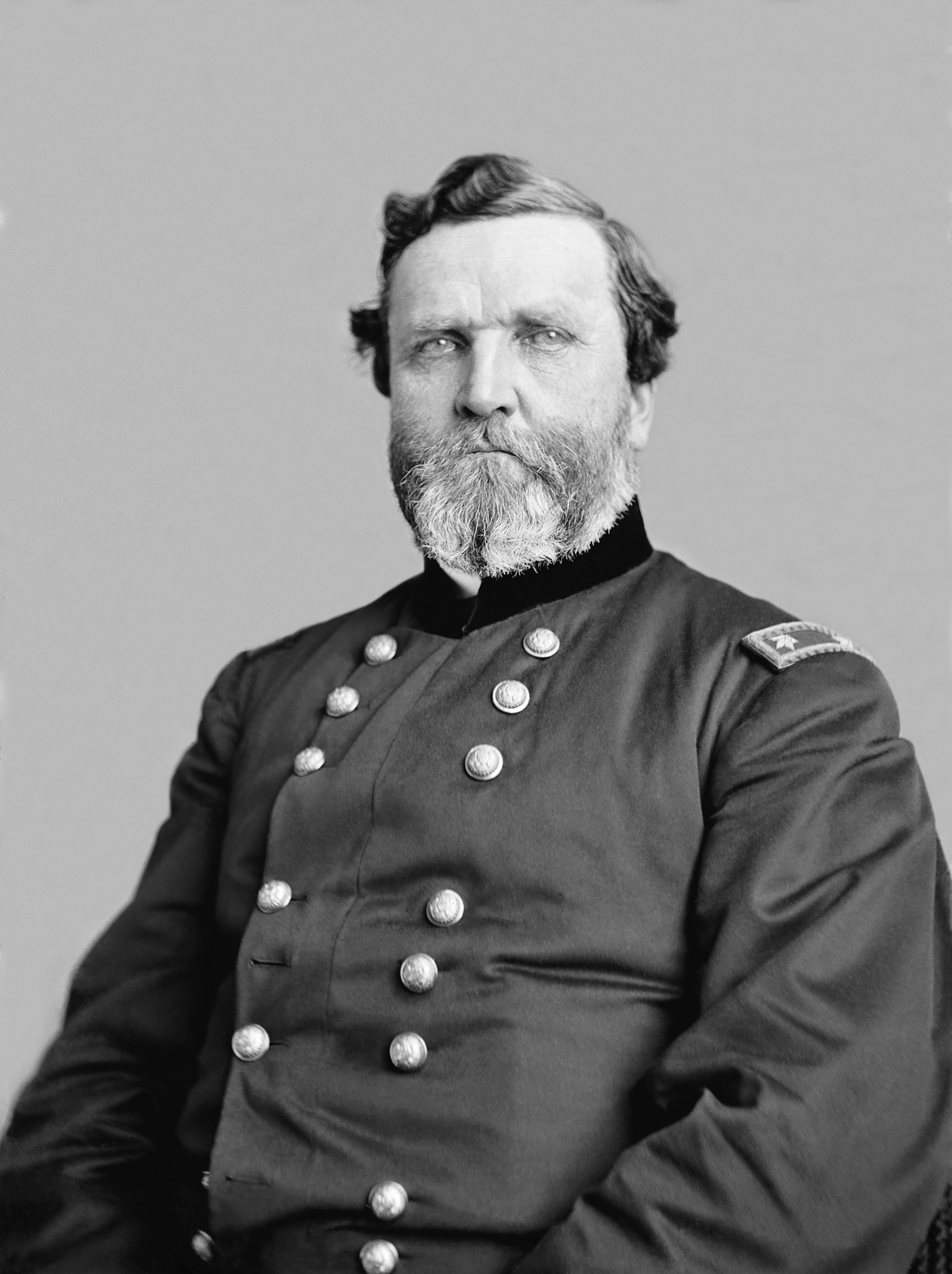
Maj. Gen.
George H. Thomas, (Commanding)

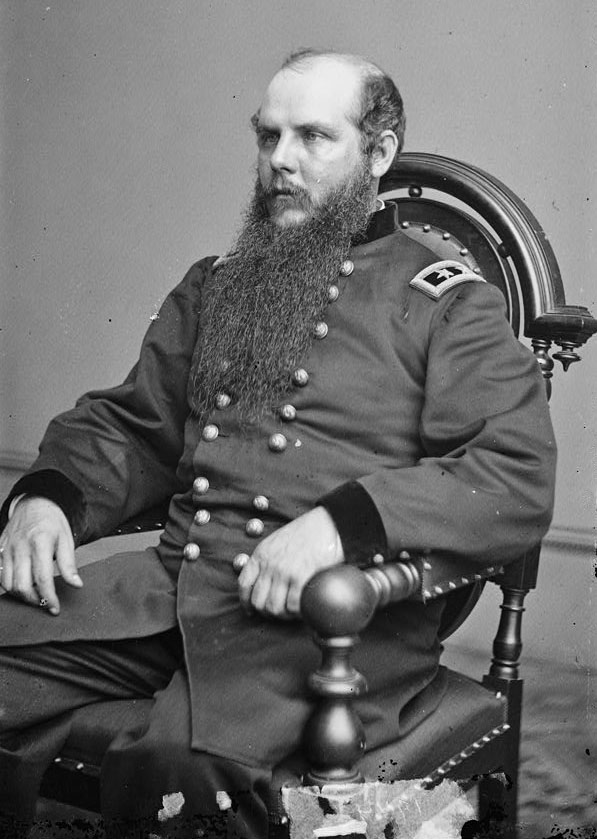
Maj. Gen.
John Schofield

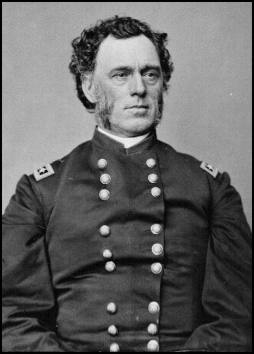
Maj. Gen.
James B. Steedman

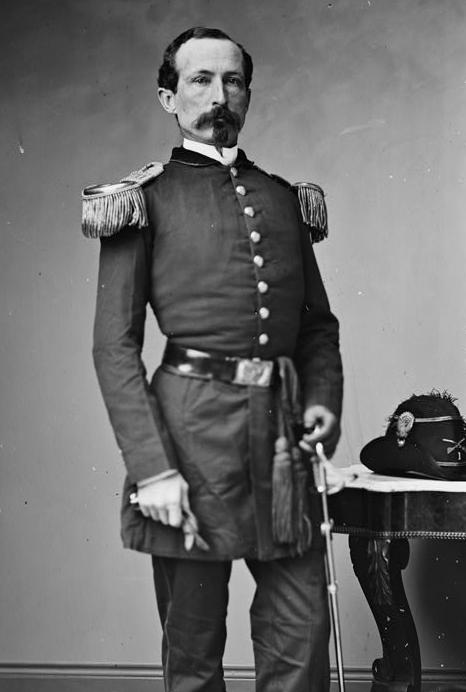
Brig. Gen.
Thomas J. Wood

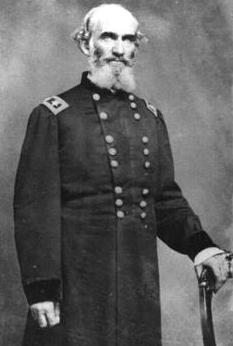
Maj. Gen.
A.J. Smith

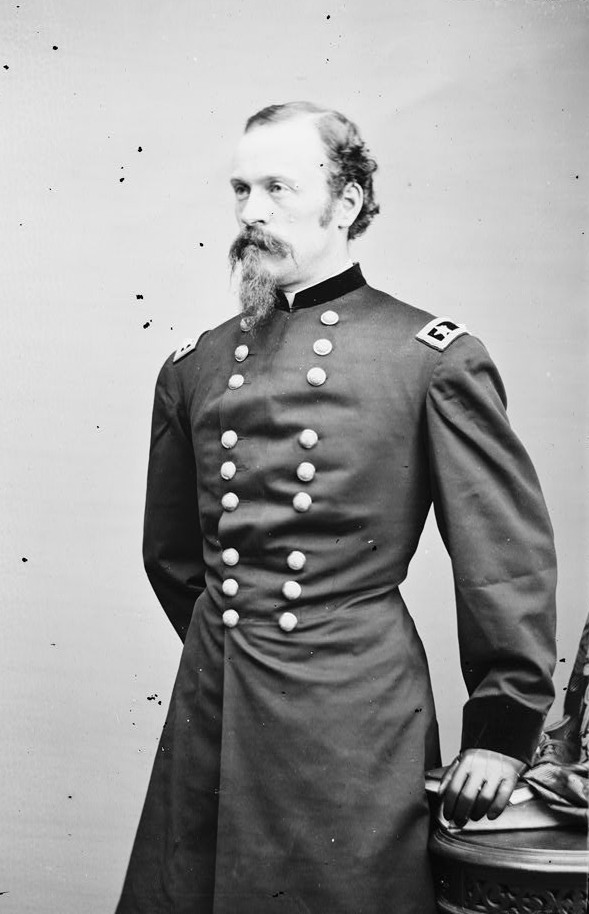
Brig. Gen.
James H. Wilson

The Union force (of about 55,000 men), was a conglomerate of units from several different departments provisionally attached to Maj. Gen. George H. Thomas' Department of the Cumberland or Army of the Cumberland and consisted of:

- IV Corps, commanded by Maj. Gen. Thomas J. Wood, with divisions commanded by Brig. Gens. Nathan Kimball, Washington Lafayette Elliott, and Samuel Beatty;
- Army of the Ohio, commanded by Maj. Gen. John M. Schofield, with divisions commanded by Maj. Gen. Darius N. Couch and Brig. Gen. Jacob D. Cox;
- "Detachment of the Army of the Tennessee" (former Right Wing, XVI Corps), commanded by Maj. Gen. Andrew J. Smith, with divisions commanded by Brig. Gens. John McArthur and Kenner Garrard and Col Jonathan B. Moore;
- Provisional Detachment (District of the Etowah), commanded by Maj. Gen. James B. Steedman, with a division (named "Provisional Division") commanded by Brig. Gen. Charles Cruft, two brigades of U.S.C.T. reporting directly to Steedman, (Note: In this brigade was a battalion of the reconstituted 44th U.S.C.T. under COL Lewis Johnson. The regiment had been captured at Dalton, Georgia in the largest surrender of African American soldiers during the war. Men in the 44th had previously gotten into a shouting match with Arkansas POWs en route to Atlanta for exchange for white U.S. POWs. After Hood demanded the garrison's surrender promising no quarter to either race if he had to attack, Rebel soldiers deliberately humiliated the black soldiers by stripping them of shoes, overcoats and hats, actions not taken with the white prisoners. Of interest, the Lost Cause myth portrayed Hood's army as ragged desperate heroes, but in actuality, the Confederate government had reshod, rearmed, reclothed, and resupplied the Rebels to a point that they were sometimes better equipped than the U.S. troops that they faced. This stripping of the black men was intended to deny their manhood and status as soldiers. Added to that was the verbal and physical abuse intended to deny them anything but slavehood. The fact that the men stripping them were the same troops from Arkansas had an added sting. While not stripped of their uniforms, the white officers of the regiment were robbed of anything of value and physically and verbally abused as well. Confederate newspapers reported, "If any [black soldiers] should live long enough they will be reduced to their normal condition [as slaves].") and the Post of Nashville commanded by Brig. Gen. John F. Miller. (Note: The post's garrison included the veteran 2nd Brigade, Fourth Division, XX Corps under COL Edwin C. Mason.)
- Cavalry Corps, commanded by Maj. Gen. James H. Wilson, with divisions commanded by Brig. Gen. Edward M. McCook, Edward Hatch, Richard W. Johnson, and Joseph F. Knipe.

=== Confederate ===
Principal Confederate commanders
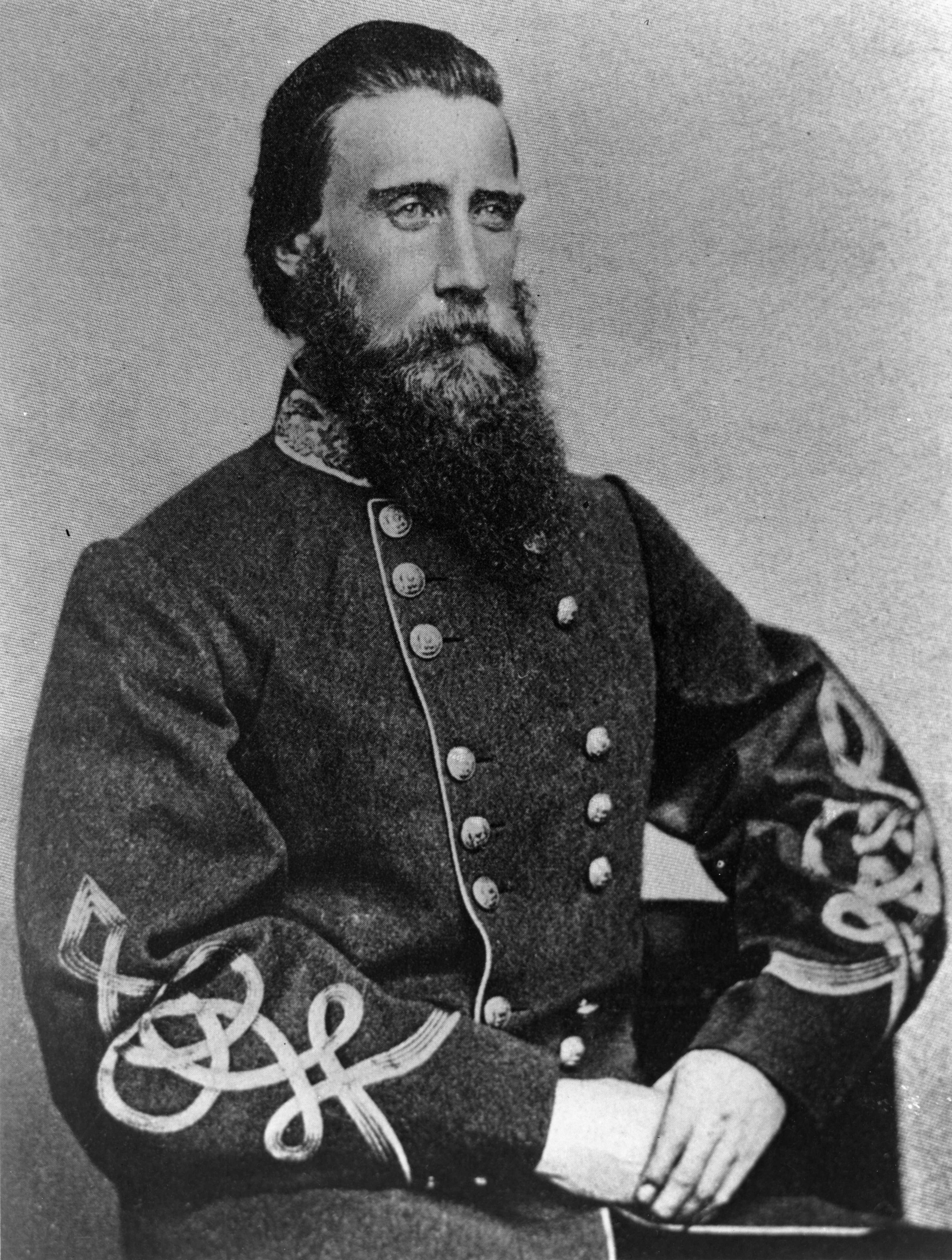
Lt. Gen.
John Bell Hood, (Commanding)

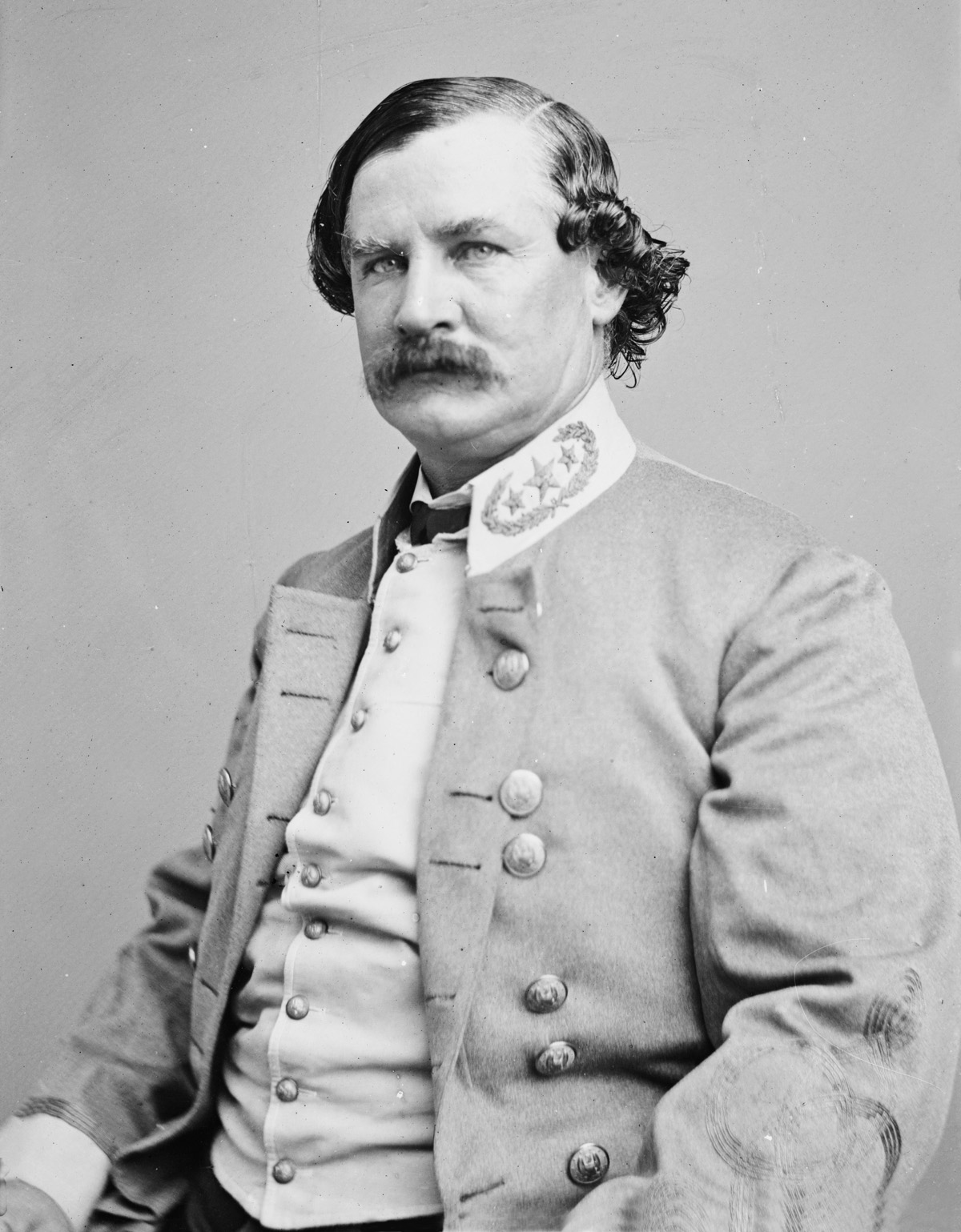
Maj. Gen.
Benjamin F. Cheatham

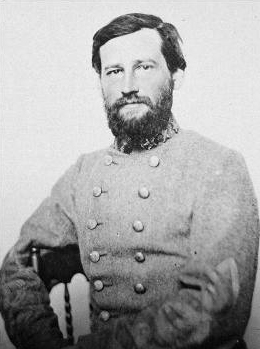
Lt. Gen.
Stephen D. Lee

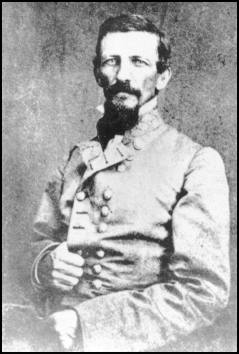
Lt. Gen.
Alexander P. Stewart

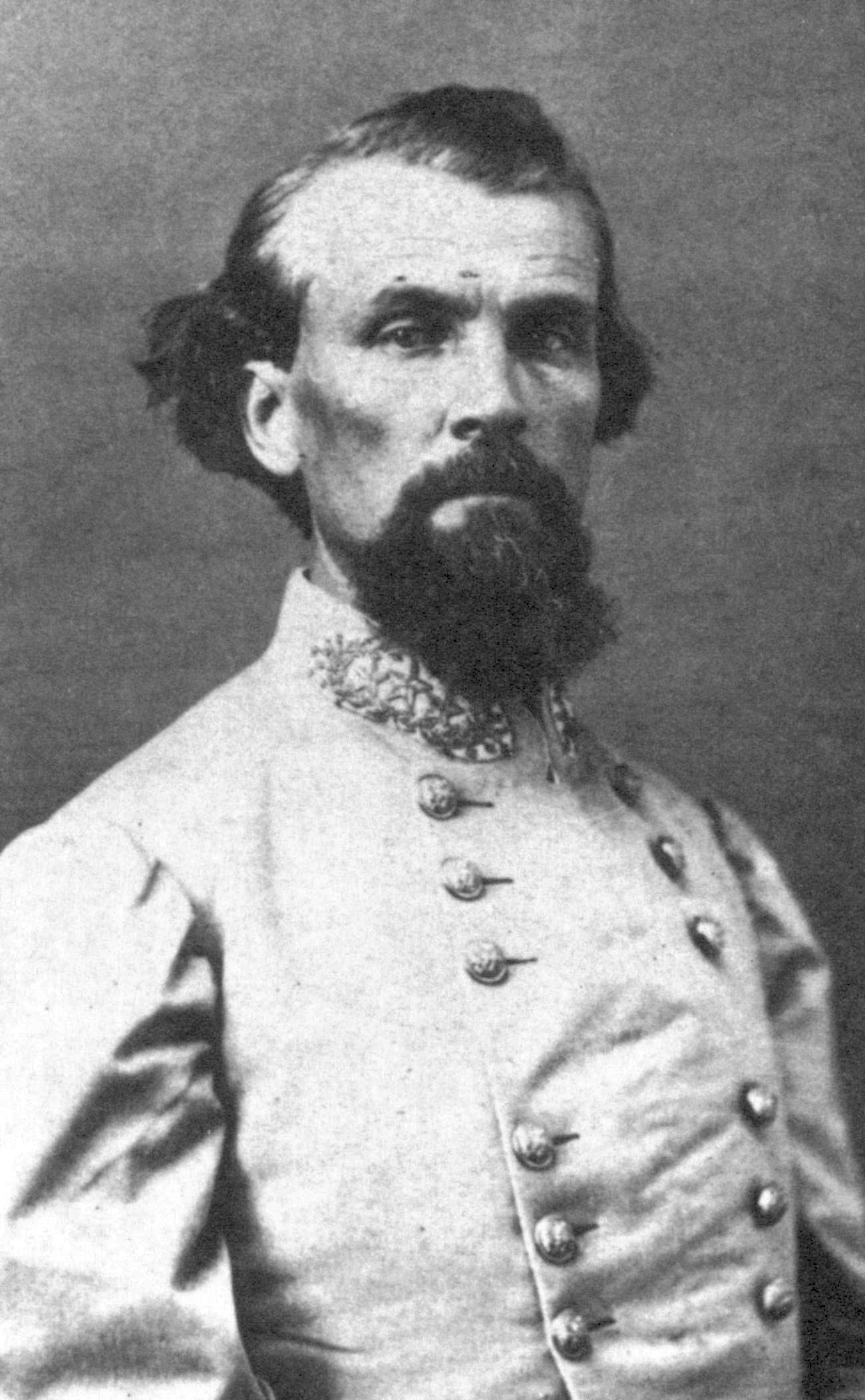
Maj. Gen.
Nathan Bedford Forrest

The Confederate Army of Tennessee under command of Gen. John B. Hood fielded approximately 30,000 men and consisting of 3 infantry army corps and 1 cavalry corps:

- Lee's Corps, commanded by Lt. Gen. Stephen D. Lee with 3 divisions;
- Stewart's Corps, commanded by Lt. Gen. Alexander P. Stewart with 3 divisions;
- Cheatham's Corps, commanded by Maj. Gen. Benjamin F. Cheatham with 3 divisions;
- Cavalry Corps, (detached at Murfreesboro and not engaged at Nashville) commanded by Maj. Gen. Nathan B. Forrest with 3 divisions.

== Thomas prepares to attack ==
Although Thomas's forces were much stronger, he could not ignore Hood's army. Despite the severe beating it had suffered at Franklin, Hood's Army of Tennessee presented a threat by its mere presence and ability to maneuver. Thomas knew he had to attack, but he prepared cautiously. His cavalry corps, commanded by the energetic young Brig. Gen. James H. Wilson, was poorly armed and mounted, and he did not want to proceed to a decisive battle without effective protection of his flanks. This was particularly important, since Wilson would be facing the horsemen of the formidable Forrest. Refitting the Union cavalry took time.

Meanwhile, Washington fumed at the seeming procrastination. When Sherman proposed his March to the Sea, Ulysses S. Grant and Henry Halleck had objected to it on the grounds that Hood would use the opportunity to invade Tennessee. In response, Sherman airily indicated that this was exactly what he wanted and that if Hood "continues to march North, all the way to Ohio, I will supply him with rations." However, when the ever-confident Sherman disappeared into the heart of Georgia, Grant once again became concerned about an invasion of Kentucky or Ohio. Grant later said of the situation, "If I had been Hood, I would have gone to Louisville and on north until I came to Chicago." His concern doubtless reflected Abraham Lincoln's concern. Lincoln had little patience for slow generals and remarked of the situation, "This seems like the McClellan and Rosecrans strategy of do nothing and let the rebels raid the country."

While pressure from Washington continued, a bitter ice storm struck Nashville on December 8, which precluded any offensive action. Sub-freezing weather continued through December 12. This was explained to Grant, but when Thomas had still not moved by December 13, Grant directed that Maj. Gen. John A. Logan proceed to Nashville and assume command if, upon his arrival, Thomas had not yet initiated operations. Logan made it as far as Louisville by December 15, but on that day the Battle of Nashville had finally begun. Grant himself left Petersburg on December 14 to take personal command and had only gotten as far as Washington when the battle began. He proceeded no further.

=== Naval actions ===
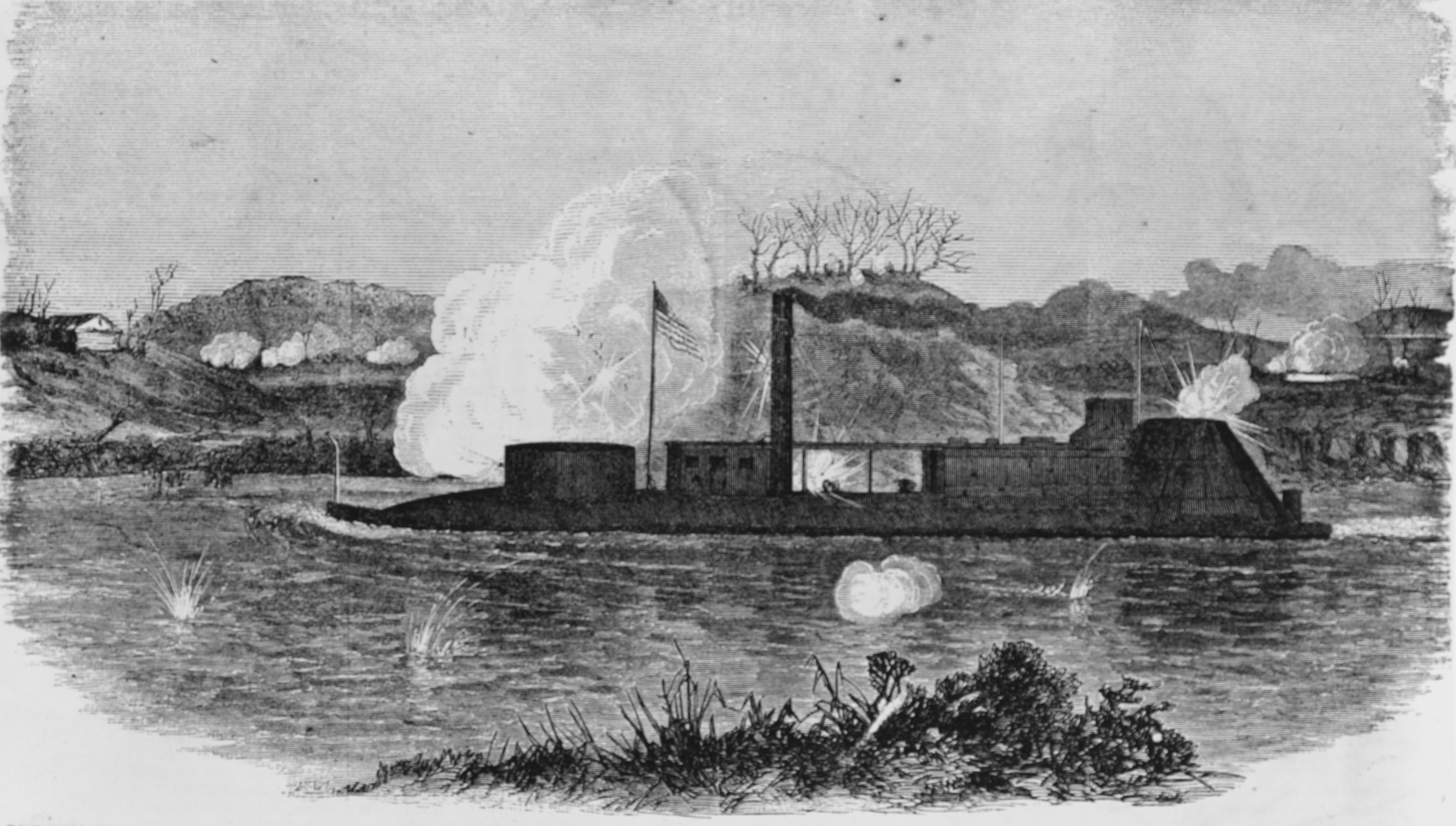
On December 7, 1864, the USS Neosho engaged the Confederate batteries at Bell's Bend. This sketch shows the ironclad moving upstream, firing on the batteries on the north bank.

The Confederates set up batteries at Bell's Bend on the Cumberland River below Nashville on December 2, 1864. They met with immediate success, capturing that day two Union transports carrying horses, mules and fodder. The Union naval squadron at Nashville responded on the night of December 3–4. While the bulk of the squadron engaged the upper battery, two ships, the ironclad Carondelet and the tinclad Fairplay, proceeded to the lower battery where they recaptured and brought off the two transports.

The Union squadron commander, Lt. Cmdr. LeRoy Fitch was ordered to break the river blockade. On December 7, he took his two heaviest ships, the ironclad USS Carondelet and the river monitor Neosho, downstream to engage the batteries. The action was inconclusive, although the Neosho sustained considerable superficial damage. Two Neosho sailors were awarded the Medal of Honor for going out onto the shell swept deck and raising the ship's flag after it had been shot down.

The Confederate batteries effectively closed the river below Nashville to supply traffic until they finally were driven off by Union cavalry on December 15.

== Battle ==
=== December 15 ===
==== Actions on the Confederate right ====
Battle of Nashville, December 15–16, 1864. Confederate Union

Thomas's plan was to launch a diversionary attack on the Confederate right that would distract them from the main attack on their left and perhaps cause them to divert troops from their left to their right. The attacking force consisted of two brigades drawn from Steedman's Provisional Division: the First Colored Brigade, (Note: This brigade, commanded by COL Morgan consisted of the 14th (LTC Henry C. Corbin), 16th, (Detached with pontoon train at time of the battle; COL William B. Gaw), 17th (COL William R. Shafter), 18th (a battalion; MAJ Lewis D. Joy), and 44th U.S. Colored Troops (also only a battalion; COL Lewis Johnson).) consisting of three regiments of United States Colored Troops (who had previously served as garrison troops or railroad guards), and a brigade composed of rear echelon white troops described by their commander as "new conscripts, convalescents, and bounty jumpers." (Note: Sword seems to interpret Grosvenor's comment as applying to the whole brigade where it more probably referred with this comment to the provisional battalion. In fact, his two core units, the 68th Indiana and the 18th Ohio Veteran were seasoned units who while being ground down by three years of fighting had maintained their presence by consolidation of veterans from other units. In addition, Foote the provisional battalion contained a number of men who had returned from furloughs too late to catch up with their original units then marching with Sherman through Georgia.)

The Confederate right was anchored on the west side of a deep cut on the Nashville & Chattanooga Railroad. A weak skirmish line was posted east of the tracks, and on December 14 this was supplemented by a stout four-gun lunette manned by Granbury's (Houghton's after Granbury's death at Franklin) Texas Brigade. Granbury's lunette was well masked by trees and brush.

The two Union brigades advanced and overran the skirmish line. They then came under heavy artillery fire from a Confederate battery on the west side of the railroad. When the brigades passed Granbury's Lunette, they were struck by very heavy close range enfilading fire. Both brigades retreated in some disorder, but they were reformed and continued for the rest of the day to fire on the Confederate works from the former skirmish line. The attack failed in its purpose, since the Confederates were not distracted and in fact had sent brigades from both Lee's and Cheatham's Corps to bolster the threatened left flank, however, Steedman's attack did take the fortifications which made Hood's left untenable and led to his withdrawal at nightfall. (Note: The attack of Steedman's USCT and cadre of veterans was downplayed by the Lost Cause when, like Greene's 2nd Division of the XII Corps seizure of the high ground between Dunker Church and "Bloody Lane" at Antietam, although not overtly dramatic, rendered the remainder of the Rebel forces defenceless as while Hood did shift troops from his right, shifting enough to counter the massive assault on his left would have let Steddman in the proverbial back door.)

==== Actions on the Confederate left ====
Thomas planned a huge wheeling movement that would ultimately come down on the Confederates' exposed left flank. Wilson's Cavalry Corps moved west on Charlotte Pike, passing through the area of the Belle Meade Plantation, where a cavalry action involving three to four hundred troopers ensued.

Once an early morning fog dissipated, driving off the Confederate cavalry patrolling the area between the Confederate left and the Cumberland River. Smith's XVI Corps detachment followed, turning south after a mile or so towards the Confederate flank. The cavalrymen formed on Smith's right flank. Schofield's XXIII followed in reserve, and as the assault moved south a gap opened between Smith and Wilson which Schofield was directed to fill. At about 2:30 pm, the Union troops attacked the five redoubts guarding the Confederate left. Four brigades, two of cavalry and two of infantry, overran Redoubt No. 4 and then Redoubt No. 5, notwithstanding the spirited resistance of the defenders of Redoubt No. 4. Another of Smith's brigades captured Redoubt No. 3; however, its commander, Col. Sylvester G. Hill, was killed by Confederate artillery firing from Redoubt No. 2. He was the highest-ranking Union officer killed in the battle. Smith's troops proceeded to Redoubt No. 2, which was quickly captured.

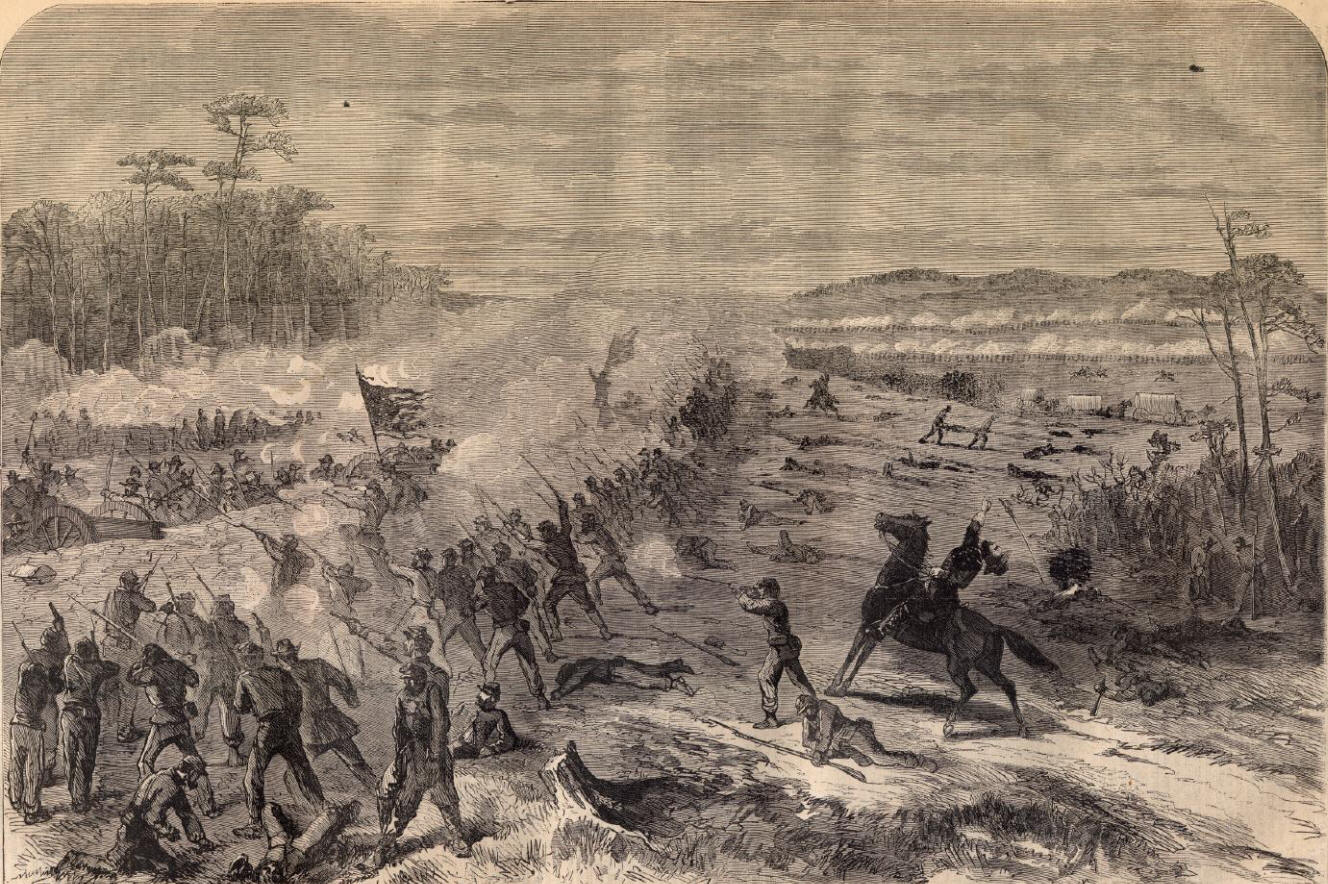
Col. Sylvester Hill was killed by Confederate artillery fire from Redoubt No. 2, just as his men overran Confederate Redoubt No. 3 on the Confederate left flank.

In the meantime, the IV Corps had been tasked with making a frontal assault from Granny White and Hillsboro Pikes on the left end of the Confederate line. The assault was to begin once Smith's troops began their assault on the left flank redoubts. The Confederate line was supposed to lie on Montgomery Hill on the north side of Brown's Creek. While the Confederates had originally established their line there, they had withdrawn to equally strong positions on the south side of Brown's Creek, as the original positions were exposed to artillery fire from the Nashville forts. The IV Corps proceeded deliberately up Montgomery Hill, only to find that it was defended by a thin skirmish line. They stopped to reorganize, and at about the same time that Smith's Detachment was rolling up the Confederate redoubts, they advanced on the main Confederate line.

Thus it happened that Redoubt No. 1, the last bastion on the Confederate left flank, was captured by troops coming from the north, south, and west. Stewart's corps had been wrecked by the day's fighting and retreated to a new line of defense a mile or two to the south. Rearguard actions by reinforcements from Lee's Corps kept the retreat from becoming a rout. With the collapse of the Confederate left, Cheatham's and Lee's Corps followed to the new line.

=== December 16 ===
==== New disposition of Confederate army ====
The Confederates' new line was much stronger and more compact than the first day's line. It was anchored on the east on Peach Orchard Hill. The western flank ran along a line of hills leading south from Compton's Hill, which after the day's battle would be called Shy's Hill after Col. William M. Shy, the Confederate officer commanding the 20th Tennessee Infantry, who died defending it. The center followed a series of sturdy dry stack stone walls enhanced by entrenching.

Hood put Lee's Corps on the right flank. With the exception of two brigades, this corps had seen no action on the previous day, and indeed had seen very little action at the bloodletting at Franklin two weeks before. Lee's line ran from the hill well into the Confederate center. Stewart's Corps, decimated by heavy casualties at Franklin and in the December 15 actions, occupied the Confederate center. Cheatham's Corps, badly hurt at Franklin, was on the Confederate left flank, which included Shy's Hill and the line of hills to its south. Rucker's cavalry brigade patrolled to the south of Cheatham's Corps.

The Confederate line defenses atop Shy's Hill appeared to be quite strong, as the steep hill dominated all of the surrounding terrain. However, appearances were deceiving. First, the defenses at the crest were a salient, and were exposed to Union artillery fire from all directions except the southeast. Second, the fortifications had been built overnight by tired troops and consisted of shallow trenches with no head logs or abatis. Third, and most fateful, the trenches were constructed on the geographical crest of the hill and not on the military crest commanding the slopes, so that attacking troops could escape fire until they were almost at the crest.

==== Thomas's plan ====
Thomas repeated his tactics of the previous day. An attack would be made on the Confederate right to draw Confederate troops from the left. Then Schofield's XXIII Corps would deliver a hammer blow on the left flank.

==== Union attack on Peach Orchard ====
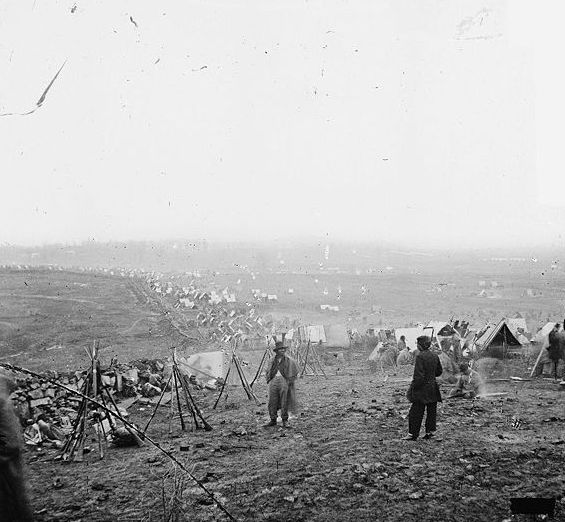
Federal outer line, December 16, 1864

The attacks on Peach Orchard Hill were made in much greater strength than those of December 15. Two brigades from Beatty's division of Wood's IV Corps and two brigades from Steedman's Provisional Division made the attack at about 3 p.m. Concentrated musket and artillery fire from the entrenched Confederates quickly broke up the attack. The trailing regiment in the 2nd Colored Brigade of Steedman's Division, the 13th United States Colored Troops, went in essentially on its own and gained the Confederate parapet, losing one of its flags and 220 officers and men in the process, about 40% of the regiment's strength.

The attack on Peach Orchard Hill had the desired effect. Hood sent two of Cheatham's brigades to reinforce Lee. The thin Confederate line on Shy's Hill and the surrounding heights got thinner.

==== Union attack on Shy's Hill ====
During this time Wilson's cavalry was very active on the Confederate left and rear, reaching past Granny White Pike. In response, Cheatham stretched his corps further and further to the south. Thomas, who was with Schofield, directed Schofield to make an attack on the western face of Shy's Hill. Schofield, imagining that he was outnumbered and in danger of an attack on his southern flank, demurred, requested that Smith send him additional divisions. Thomas directed Smith to comply with this request. Smith sent a division, and still Schofield did nothing.

Sunset was rapidly approaching, and if no attack was made before then Hood would be in a position to either strengthen his position overnight or safely retreat south.

Brig. Gen. John McArthur, one of Smith's division commanders, was aware of this. He also saw that the Confederate lines were being badly battered by Union artillery, which was firing on them from nearly every direction. At about 3:30 p.m. he sent a message to Smith and Thomas that unless he were given orders to the contrary, his division was going to attack Shy's Hill and the Confederate line immediately to its east in the next five minutes.

The three brigade attack began on McArthur's timetable. One brigade went up and over Shy's Hill. Because of the misplacement of the Confederate trenches, only the regiment on the east sustained significant casualties from Confederates, who were firing from the plain to its left. McArthur's second brigade hit these Confederates while they were so distracted. The third brigade, attacking to the east of Granny White Pike caught a large body of Confederate skirmishers outside of their lines and went into the Confederate lines with them.

==== Confederate left flank disintegrates ====
The Confederate left flank suddenly disintegrated. The Confederate line was rolled up west to east. Granny White Pike had been blocked by Wilson's cavalry. The Confederates retreated to the south by the Franklin Pike and a gap in the Overton Hills through the Otter Creek bottom. A part of Lee's Corps maintained good order and covered the retreat on Franklin Pike. Rucker's Confederate cavalry brigade performed the same service in a nighttime melee in the rain on Granny White Pike. (Note: BGEN Chalmers' report was found incomplete and unsigned, among General Chalmers' military papers after his death.)

=== Hood's retreat ===
On the night of December 16, what was left of Hood's army headed south towards Franklin on two roads, Franklin Pike and Granny White Pike. Rucker having blunted for the time being the Union pursuit on Granny White Pike, the main pursuit was by Union cavalry on Franklin Pike. Lee's rearguard held off the attacks.

At this point, the pursuit slowed because Thomas had sent his pontoon bridge train towards Murfreesboro rather than Franklin and Columbia, and his artillery and supply trains could not cross the Harpeth River until the pontoon train arrived. This did not stop Wilson's cavalry from aggressively pursuing the Confederates as they retreated to Columbia. Wilson badly hurt Carter L. Stevenson's rearguard division in actions on December 17 and 18, but was forced to stop because of the lack of supplies. Wilson's problems were compounded when Forrest and his two cavalry divisions arrived in Columbia from Murfreesboro on December 18.

On December 19 the Confederate infantry and artillery crossed the Duck River at Columbia, destroying the bridges behind them. Forrest took charge of the rearguard, attaching an ad hoc infantry division under Brig. Gen. Edward C. Walthall to his Cavalry Corps.

Because of the misdirected pontoon train, Thomas was not able to cross the Duck River until December 23. Wilson continued his vigorous pursuit, but was stymied by Forrest over the next three days in hard-fought rearguard actions at Richland Creek, Anthony's Hill, and Sugar Creek. Hood was able to get his army across the Tennessee River on a pontoon bridge near Bainbridge, Alabama by December 28. Thomas had asked Rear Admiral S. P. Lee, commanding the Tennessee River naval squadron, to destroy the Confederate bridge. However, low water and Confederate artillery prevented Union tinclad gunboats from interdicting the crossing.

Steedman's Provisional Division was sent by rail from Nashville to Chattanooga and from there by river boat to Decatur, Alabama, to cut off Hood's retreat. His force arrived too late to interfere with the crossing. However, Steedman's cavalry under the command of Colonel William Jackson Palmer captured the Confederate pontoon train on December 30 along with a large number of supply wagons.

That marked the end of the Union pursuit.

Additional maps
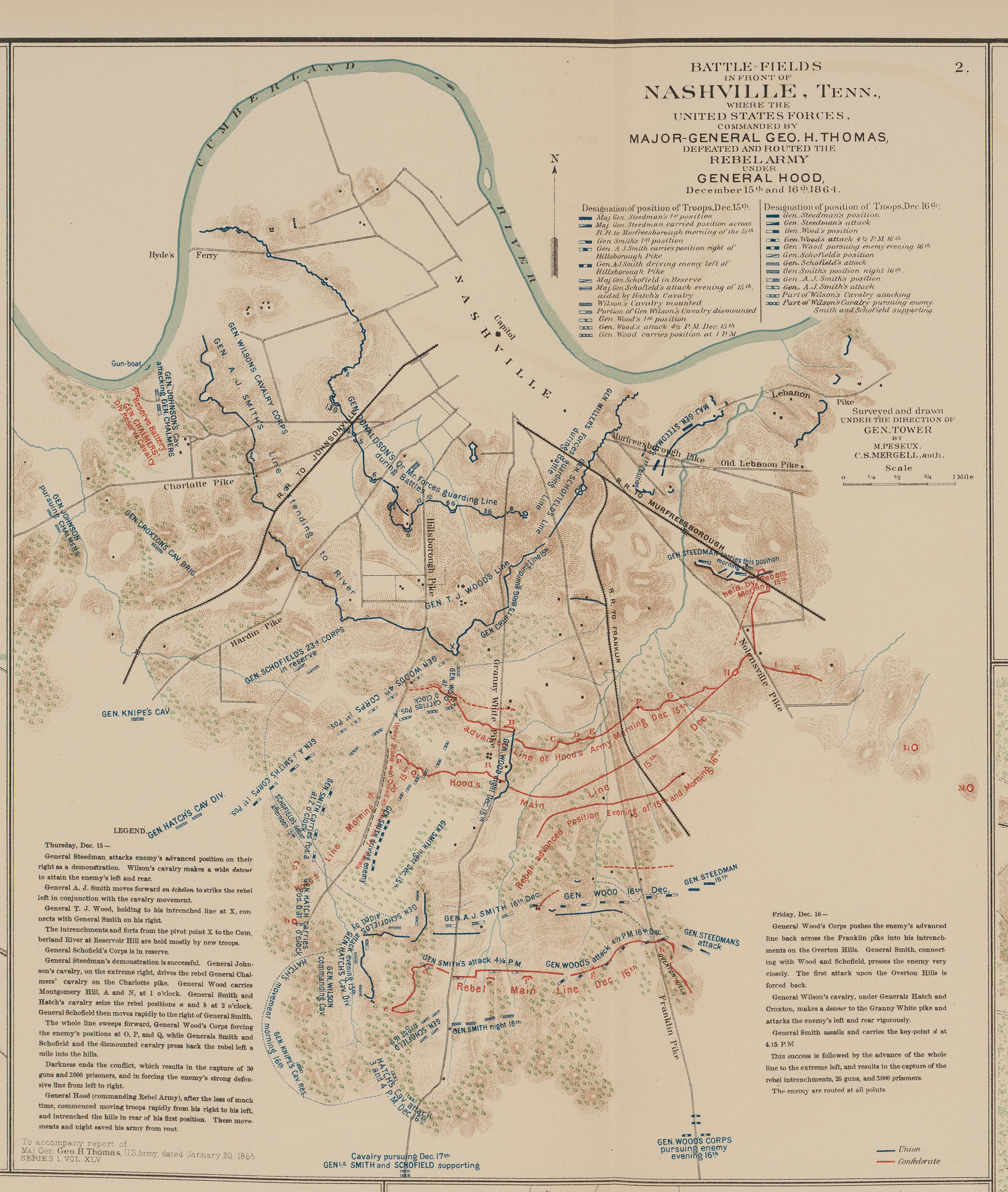
Battle of Nashville, December 15–16, 1864 (Additional map 1)

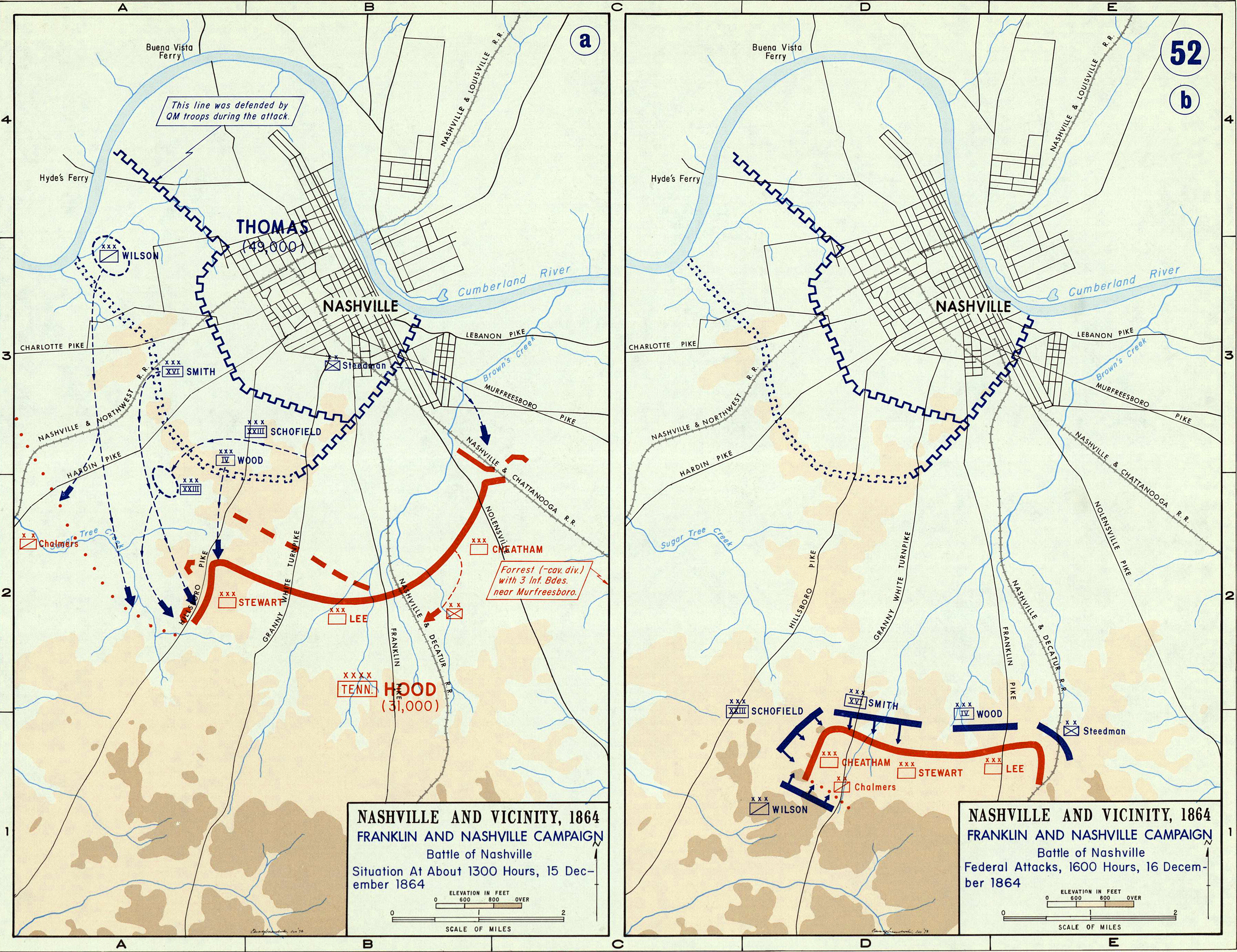
Battle of Nashville, December 15–16, 1864 (Additional map 2)

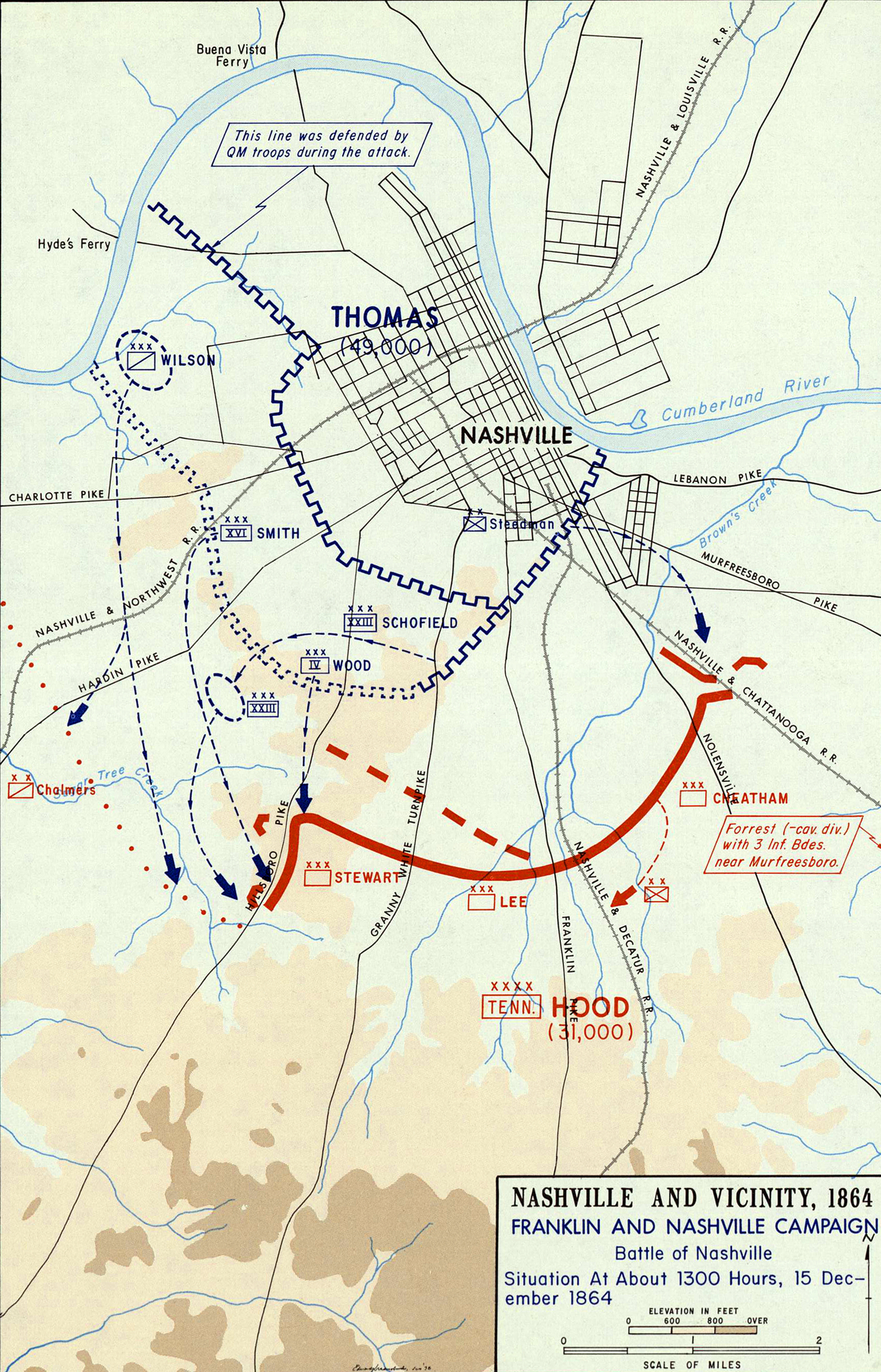
Battle of Nashville, situation about 1300 Hours (December 15, 1864)

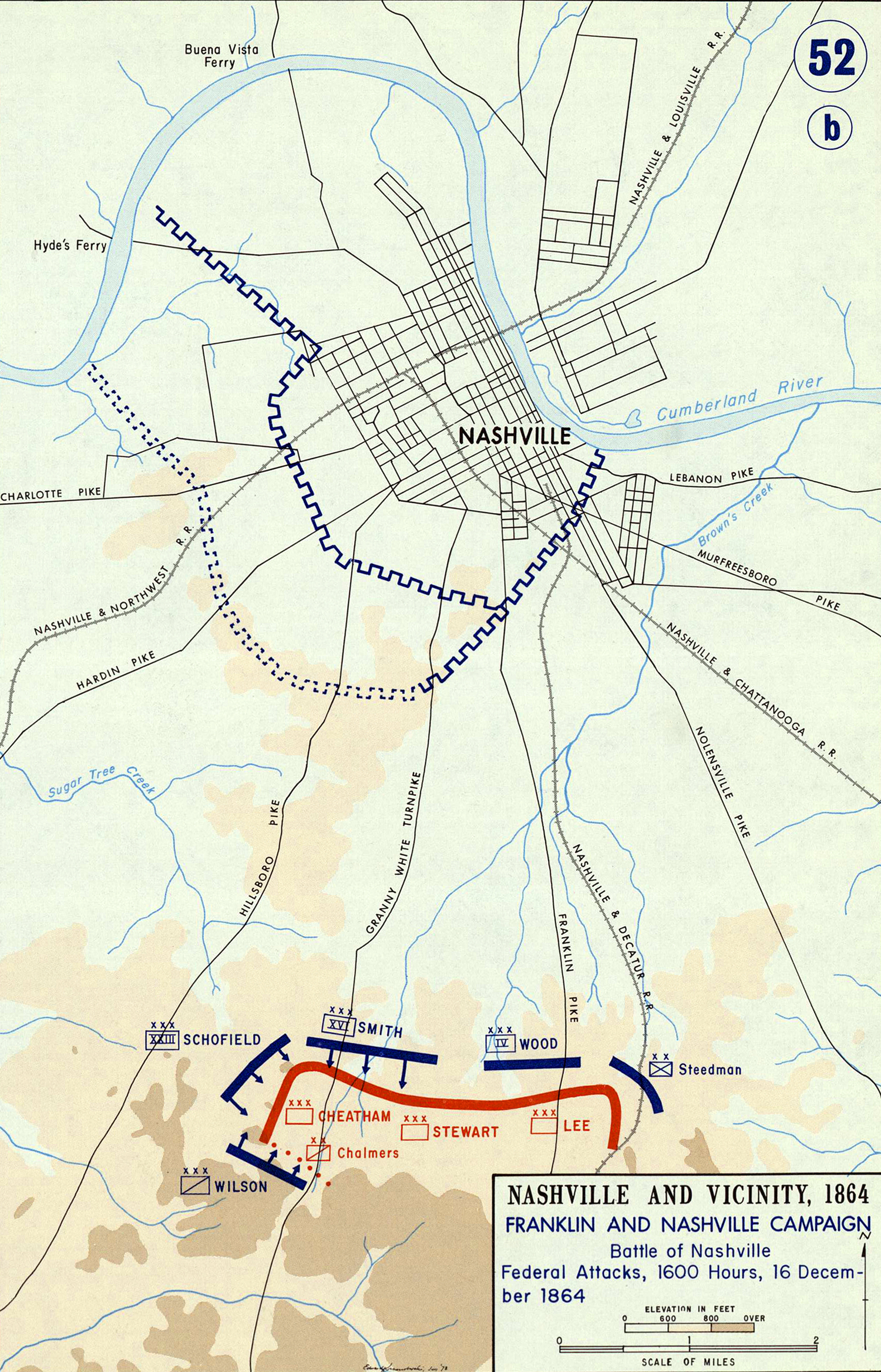
Battle of Nashville, situation about 1600 Hours (December 16, 1864)

== Aftermath ==
=== Casualties ===
Federal casualties in the battle totaled 387 killed, 2,562 wounded, and 112 missing.

As only a few of the Confederate units submitted reports on the battle, Confederate casualties are difficult to determine. Thomas reported capturing 4,561 prisoners in the battle itself, with an unknown number captured during the retreat. One historian made an educated guess that 2,500 Confederates were killed and wounded at Nashville.

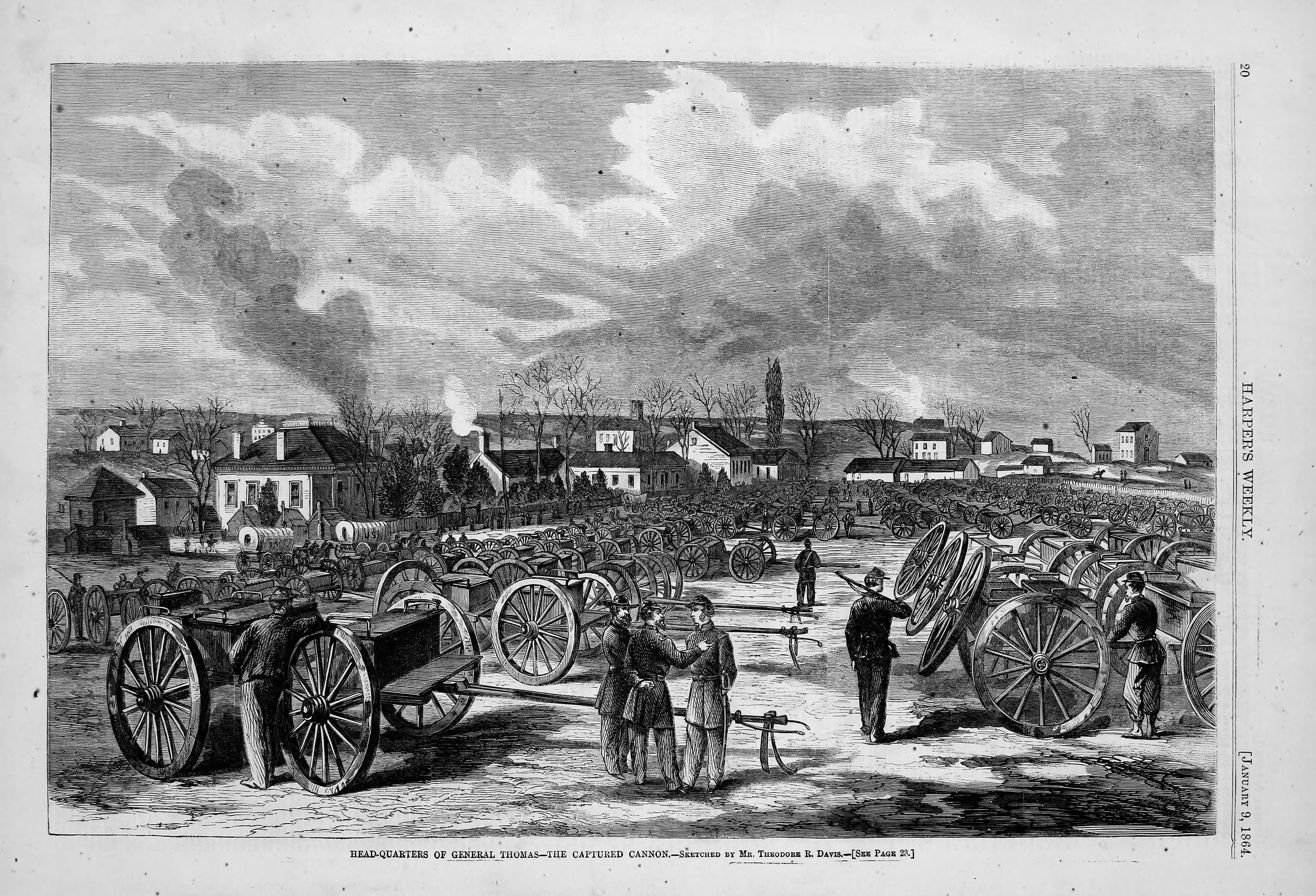
Headquarters of Gen. Thomas—The Captured Cannon by Mr. Theodore R. Davis (Harper's Weekly, January 9, 1864)

The Army of Tennessee had gone into Middle Tennessee campaign with approximately 38,000 men, exclusive of Forrest's cavalry. The Army had sustained severe casualties at Spring Hill, Franklin, and Nashville, and suffered at least 2,000 desertions in the latter part of the campaign. On January 20 Hood reported an effective strength of 18,742, again exclusive of Forrest's cavalry. Gen. P. G. T. Beauregard, Hood's nominal superior, advised the Confederate President on January 13 that the Army of Tennessee had fewer than 15,000 men.

=== Reactions and effects ===
The Battle of Nashville marked the effective end of the Army of Tennessee. Historian David Eicher remarked, "If Hood mortally wounded his army at Franklin, he would kill it two weeks later at Nashville." Although Hood blamed the entire debacle on his subordinates and the soldiers themselves, his career was over. He retreated with his army to Tupelo, Mississippi, resigned his command on January 13, 1865, and was not given another field command.

== Battlefield preservation ==
The Nashville battlefield is huge by Civil War standards, encompassing almost all of south and west Nashville. Nashvillians who live in the Green Hills, Forest Hills, Oak Hill, Lipscomb, or Brentwood neighborhoods are living on top of a battlefield.

In the earlier part of the twentieth century there was some talk of creating a National Battlefield Park in Nashville. This movement failed, due to lack of support from Nashville's civic leaders, who as Southerners were not particularly interested in commemorating a battle that was such a profound Confederate defeat. As a result, much like Atlanta, most of the Nashville battlefield has been lost to development. However, the battle is memorialized and small parts of it have been preserved.

=== Battlefield memorials ===
A Battle of Nashville monument was created in 1927 by Giuseppe Moretti, who was commissioned by the Ladies Battlefield Association. Erected in the years immediately following World War I, the monument honors the soldiers of both sides and celebrated a united nation. The monument was severely damaged by a tornado in 1974, and during the 1980s interstate highway construction left the monument landlocked on a small plot of ground overlooking the massive highway interchange of I-65 and I-440. In 1999 the monument was relocated to the Nashville Battlefield Park at the intersection of Granny White Pike and Clifton Lane, just north of the Confederate line on the first day of the battle.

==== Minnesota monuments ====
In 1920 the State of Minnesota erected a large monument in the Nashville National Cemetery honoring its soldiers who were buried there. Minnesota lost more men at the Battle of Nashville than in any other Civil War battle.

==== United States Colored Troops monument ====
In 2006 a group of private citizens erected a monument in the Nashville National Cemetery honoring soldiers of the United States Colored Troops buried there, many of whom fought in the Battle of Nashville.

==== Shy's Hill memorials ====
Erected by the Battle of Nashville Preservation Society, this honors the troops of both sides who fought on and around Shy's Hill. The memorial consists of three flags, an American flag, a Confederate national flag, and a Minnesota state flag (honoring the four regiments of Minnesotans who were instrumental in capturing the hill).

A marker was placed on the slope of Shy's Hill in late 2014 in honor of the contributions to the Minnesota regiments that fought in the battle. It was dedicated by members of the Minnesota Civil War Commemoration Task Force and the Battle of Nashville Preservation Society on November 16, 2014.

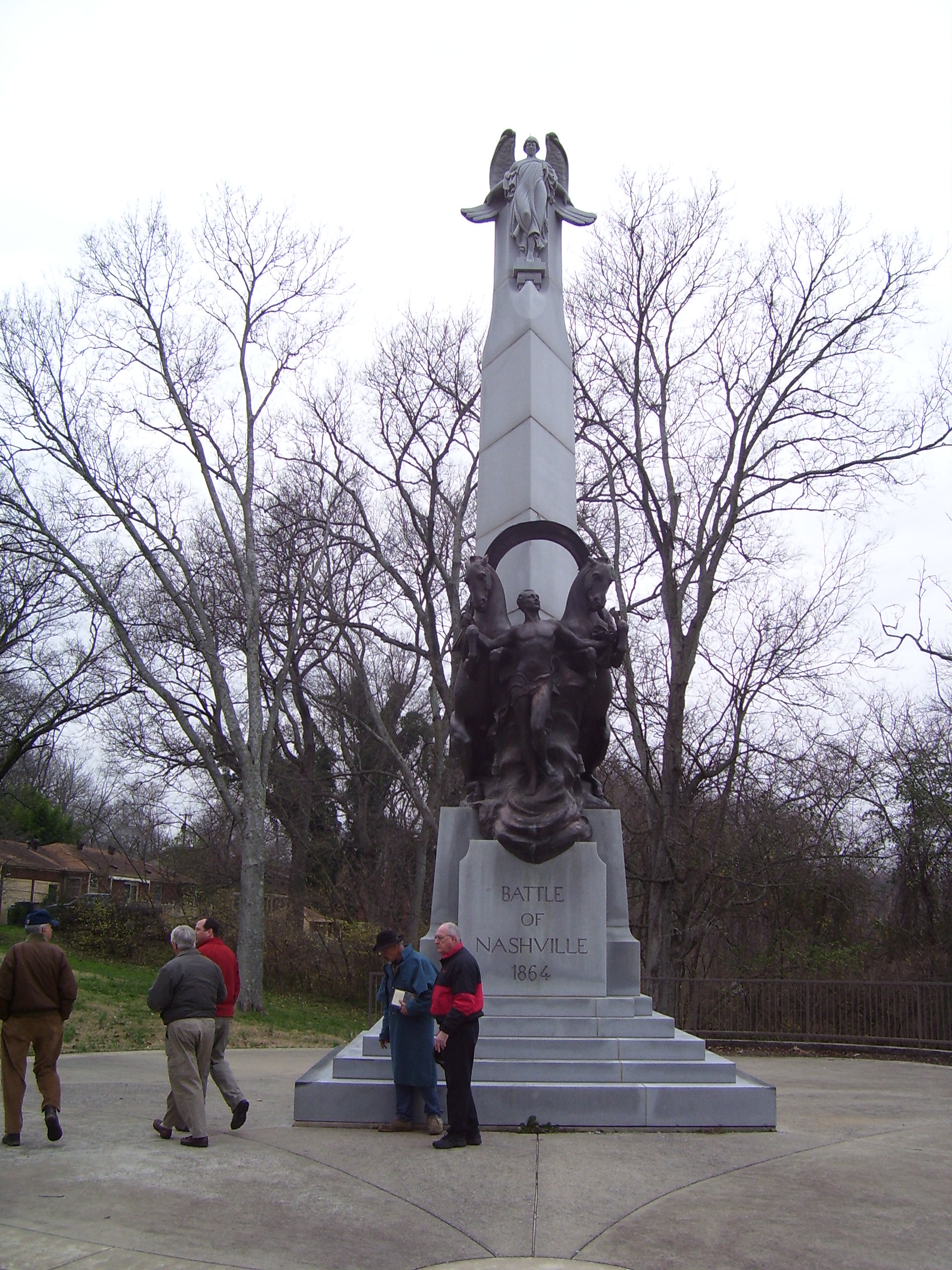
The Battle of Nashville Monument is now located at the intersection of Granny White Pike and Clifton Lane

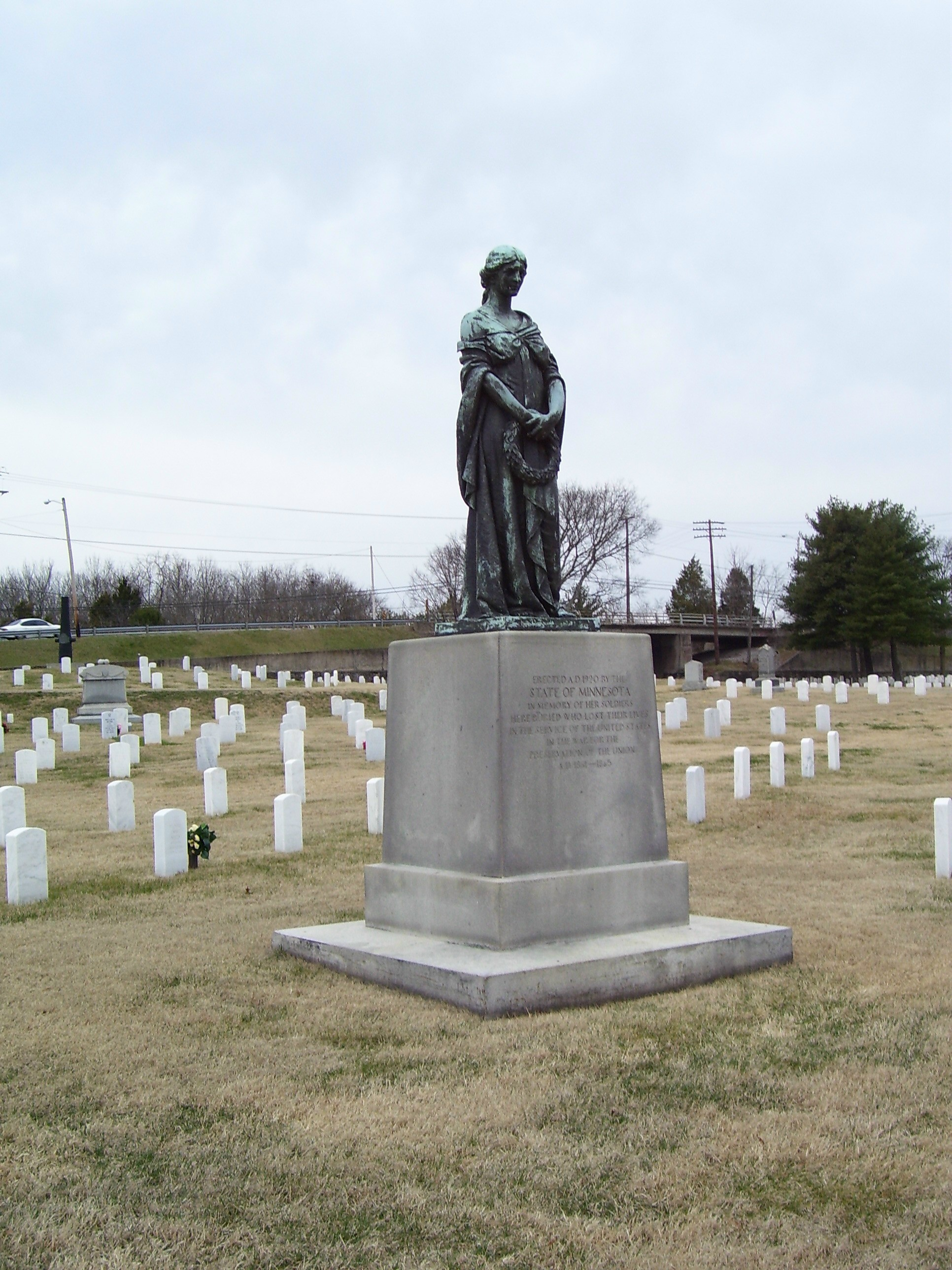
The Minnesota Monument at the Nashville National Cemetery

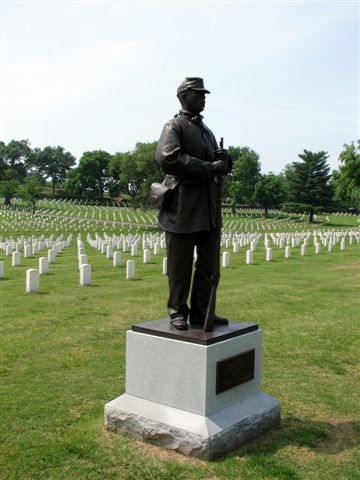
The monument to the United States Colored Troops at Nashville National Cemetery

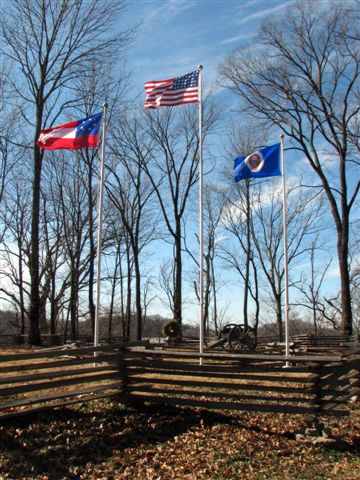
Battle of Nashville memorial atop Shy's Hill

=== Historic homes and buildings ===
- Belle Meade Plantation: A skirmish was fought on the front lawn, scars on the columns on the front porch are believed to be bullet holes from the battle.
- Belmont Mansion: Served as Union General Thomas Woods's headquarters. The Belmont Water Tower on the grounds of the mansion served as a signal station.
- Travellers Rest: Served as headquarters of the Army of Tennessee.
- Sunnyside: This antebellum home in the 12 South District of Nashville lay between the Union and Confederate lines. It was used as a hospital after the first day's battle. It is the headquarters of the Metropolitan Historical Commission and has not been completely restored.
- Glen Leven: This Greek Revival home on Franklin Pike was built in 1857. It was used as a hospital by the Union during and after the battle. The home and the surrounding 65 acres (26 ha) were donated by the Thompson family to the Land Trust for Tennessee in 2007. It is closed to the public except for special events.
- Downtown Presbyterian Church: Served as a hospital after the battle.
- Metropolitan Board of Parks and Recreation
- Fort Negley: This large masonry fortification was built in 1862–1863 by African-Americans forcibly impressed by the Union military government. Guns placed there fired the first shots in the battle. The fort is a ruin, but has been stabilized and interpreted.
- Nashville City Cemetery: Union dead from the battle (and some Confederate dead) were buried in an annex to this ante-bellum cemetery.
- Kelley's Point: This is a short but attractive greenway that runs from a Lowe's Super Center parking lot on Charlotte Pike at its intersection with Davidson Road to the site of a Confederate battery on the Cumberland River. The remains of earthworks are faintly visible.

=== Privately owned but publicly accessible sites ===
- Granbury's Lunette. Owned by the Joseph E. Johnston Camp, Sons of Confederate Veterans. Located at 190 Polk Avenue. Played an important role in repelling the Union attack on the Confederate right on the first day of the battle. The lunette was partly destroyed by railroad construction in the early 1900s.
- Redoubt No. 1. Owned by the Battle of Nashville Preservation Society. Captured in the first day of the battle by troops from the IV Corps and XVI Corps. Located on Benham Avenue in Green Hills. This has been preserved and interpreted. Earthworks are clearly visible.
- Redoubt No. 4. The Battle of Nashville Preservation Society has an historic easement on the remnants of this fortification, consisting of the remnants of its northern face. It is located in the Abbottsford development off of Abbott–Martin Road in Green Hills. The remainder of the redoubt, which extended to Hobbs Road, was destroyed during home construction in the 1950s.
- Shy's Hill. This is owned by the Battle of Nashville Preservation Society and is located just off of Battery Lane on Benton Smith Drive. Its fall on the second day of the battle precipitated the Confederate rout. It is well-interpreted. Earthworks on top of the hill were destroyed when a water tower (now removed) was erected in the early 1950s; Confederate trench lines on the east and south slopes are clearly visible.
- Mount Olivet Cemetery. Under the direction of the Ladies' Memorial Society of Nashville, Confederates killed or mortally wounded in the battle were removed from battlefield graves and City Cemetery in 1868 and reinterred at Confederate Circle at Mount Olivet. A large monument was erected on the site in 1889.

=== Driving tour ===
The Battle of Nashville Preservation Society has published a downloadable self-guided driving tour Members of the Society provide guided battlefield tours for a fee.

== See also ==
- List of National Historic Landmarks in Tennessee
- National Register of Historic Places listings in Tennessee
- Troop engagements of the American Civil War, 1864
- List of costliest American Civil War land battles
- Franklin-Nashville Campaign and Battle of Franklin
- Atlanta campaign
- Sherman's March
