= 44th United States Colored Infantry Regiment =

- Active: April 7, 1864 - April 30, 1866
- Country: United States
- Allegiance: Union
- Branch: Infantry
- Engagements: Action at Dalton; Battle of Nashville

The 44th United States Colored Infantry was an infantry regiment that served in the Union Army during the American Civil War. The regiment was composed of African American enlisted men commanded by white officers and was authorized by the Bureau of Colored Troops which was created by the United States War Department on May 22, 1863.

== Service ==
The 44th U.S. Colored Infantry was organized in Chattanooga, Tennessee (Note: It was formed from runaway slaves streaming from across the South to the safety of federal lines in Tennessee. The majority of recruits included freemen from Ohio and free and enslaved from Alabama, Georgia, and Tennessee, but also from as far away as the Carolinas, Kentucky, Maryland, Virginia, Washington D.C., and West Virginia.) beginning April 7, 1864 for three-year service under the command of Colonel Lewis Johnson. (Note: Johnson, a German immigrant born in 1841, had spent two years as a Prussian Naval cadet before making his way to Lafayette, IN via New York. At the war's onset in April 1861, Johnson enlisted as a private in the 10th Indiana Volunteer Infantry. His prior naval training and his abilities led to his rising in the rank of captain by the spring of 1864, when, after fighting at Rich Mountain, Mill Springs, Corinth, Perryville, Tullahoma, Chickamauga, Siege of Chattanooga and Missionary Ridge, he was appointed colonel of the 44th.)

The regiment was attached to District of Chattanooga, Department of the Cumberland, to November 1864. Unattached, District of the Etowah, Department of the Cumberland, to December 1864. 1st Colored Brigade, District of the Etowah, Department of the Cumberland, to January 1865. Unattached, District of the Etowah, to March 1865. 1st Colored Brigade, Department of the Cumberland, to July 1865. 2nd Brigade, 4th Division, District of East Tennessee, July 1865. Department of the Cumberland and Department of Georgia to April 1866.

The 44th U.S. Colored Infantry mustered out of service April 30, 1866.

== Detailed service ==
Post and garrison duty at Chattanooga, Tennessee, until November, 1864. Action at Dalton, Georgia, October 13, 1864. Battle of Nashville, December 15–16. Pursuit of Hood to the Tennessee River December 17–28. Post and garrison duty at Chattanooga in the District of East Tennessee, and in the Department of Georgia until April 1866.

The regiment was captured at Dalton, Georgia in the largest surrender of African American soldiers during the war. Men in the 44th had previously gotten into a shouting match with Arkansas POWs en route to Atlanta for exchange for white U.S. POWs. Gen. Patrick Cleburne now let these Arkansas troops lead the charge against the 44th. Hood demanded the garrison surrender and promised no quarter to either race if he had to attack. Rebel soldiers deliberately humiliated the black soldiers by stripping them of shoes, overcoats and hats, actions not taken with the white prisoners. (Note: The Lost Cause myth portrayed Hood's army as ragged desperate heroes, but in actuality, the Confederate government had reshod, rearmed, reclothed, and resupplied the Rebels to a point that they were sometimes better equipped than the U.S. troops that they faced. This stripping of the black men was intended to deny their manhood and status as soldiers. Added to that was the verbal and physical abuse intended to deny them anything but slavehood. The fact that the men stripping them were the same troops from Arkansas had an added sting. While not stripped of their uniforms, the white officers of the regiment were robbed of anything of value and physically and verbally abused as well. Confederate newspapers reported, "If any [black soldiers] should live long enough they will be reduced to their normal condition [as slaves].")

The Rebels put the African-American soldiers to work at tearing up railroad tracks. A black sergeant refused, and his guards killed him. Rebels executed five men for not keeping up with the march. Some Rebels from Mississippi tried to rush and massacre the black prisoners but their commanders intervened. Eventually, the Rebels sent 250 members back to their former masters and impressed 350 as personal servants for officers or as engineer labor in Mississippi and at Mobile, Alabama. By December 1, 1865, only 125 of these men were still alive but in desperate circumstances.

Meanwhile, Col. Johnson returned to Tennessee as soon as he was able and recruited again for the regiment, mustering approximately 300 men. Many members of the 44th managed to escape and make their way back to rejoin their regiment. By the Battles around Nashville in December, they were eager for revenge.

== Commanders ==
- Colonel Lewis Johnson

== See also ==
- List of United States Colored Troops Civil War Units
- United States Colored Troops
