= Fort Sumter =

Historic coastal fortress in South Carolina, United States

- U.S. National Register of Historic Places
- U.S. Historic district
- IUCN Category V (Protected Landscape/Seascape)
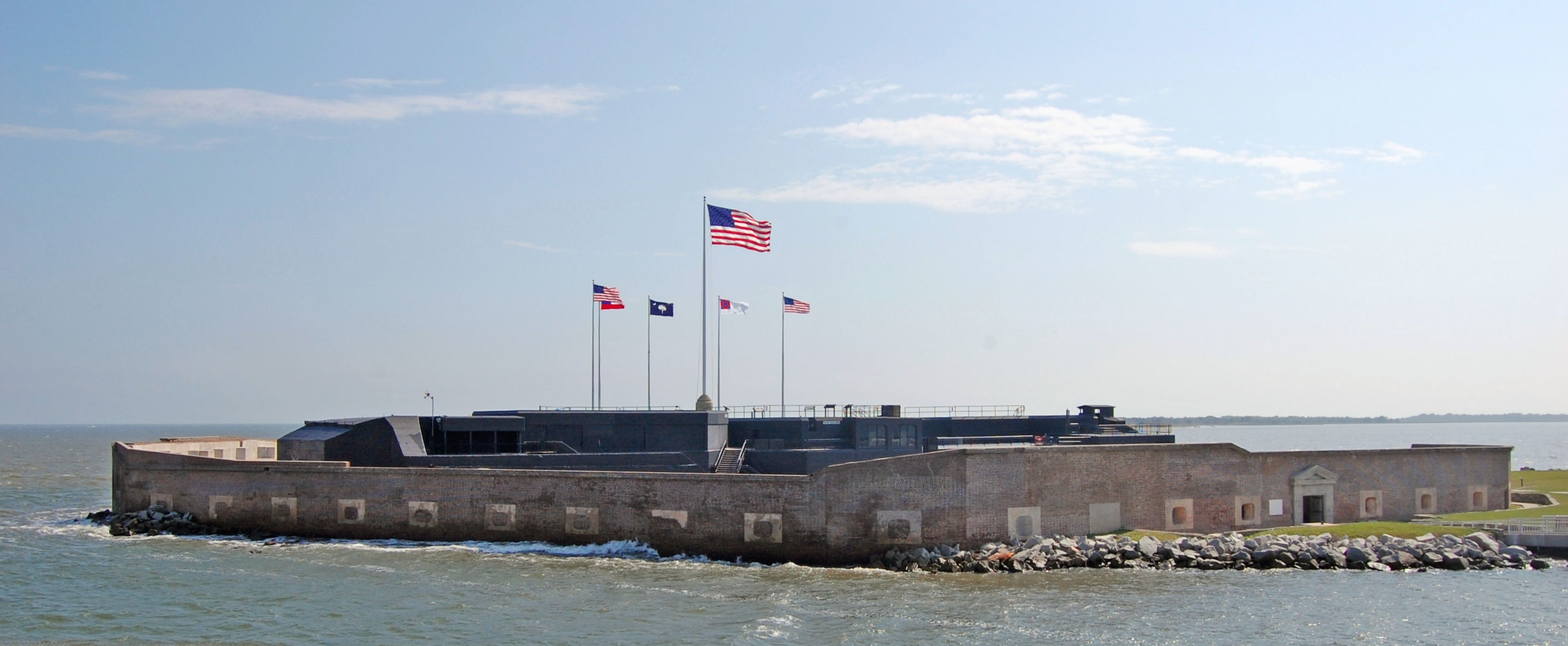
- View from north in 2009

- Location within the United States Location within South Carolina
- Location: Charleston Harbor, South Carolina
- Coordinates: 32°45′8″N 79°52′29″W
- Area: 234.74 acres (0.95 km^{2})
- Built: 1829; 197 years ago
- Visitation: 857,883
- Website: Fort Sumter and Fort Moultrie National Historical Park
- NRHP reference No.: 66000101

Significant dates
- Added to NRHP: October 15, 1966
- Designated HD: April 28, 1948

Fort Sumter is a sea fort at the mouth of Charleston Harbor, South Carolina, where the battle that sparked the American Civil War took place. Built on an artificial island in 1829 in response to the War of 1812, which had exposed the inadequacy of American coastal defenses, it remained unfinished on April 12, 1861, when it was attacked by Confederate forces and greatly damaged. Efforts at rebuilding after the Civil War never completed the fort's original plan, but since the middle of the 20th century it has been open to the public and operated by the National Park Service.

== History ==
=== The building of Fort Sumter ===
Named after Continental Army officer Thomas Sumter, Fort Sumter was ordered in response to the War of 1812, which had exposed the inadequacy of existing American coastal fortifications to defend against naval attacks. It was built near Charleston, South Carolina, as part of the third system of U.S. fortifications to protect American harbors from a naval invasion. Constructed on an artificial island in the middle of the channel that provides Charleston with natural shelter, Fort Sumter was intended to dominate the harbor, reinforcing the protection provided by the shore artillery batteries at Fort Moultrie, Fort Wagner, and Fort Gregg.

The artificial island was originally a sand bar. In 1827, a group of engineers carried out depth sounding and concluded that it was a suitable location for a fort. Construction began in 1829. Seventy thousand tons of granite were transported from New England to build up the artificial island. By 1834, a timber foundation that was several feet beneath the water had been laid. However, the decision was made to build a (stronger) brick fort.

The brick fort is five-sided, 170 to 190 feet (52 to 58 m) long, with walls five feet (1.5 m) thick, standing 50 feet (15.2 m) over the low tide mark. Although never completed, it was designed to house 650 men and 135 guns in three tiers of gun emplacements.

Construction dragged out because of title problems, then problems with funding such a large and technically challenging project. Unpleasant weather and disease made the situation worse. The exterior was eventually finished, but the interior and armaments were never completed.

=== Ownership ===
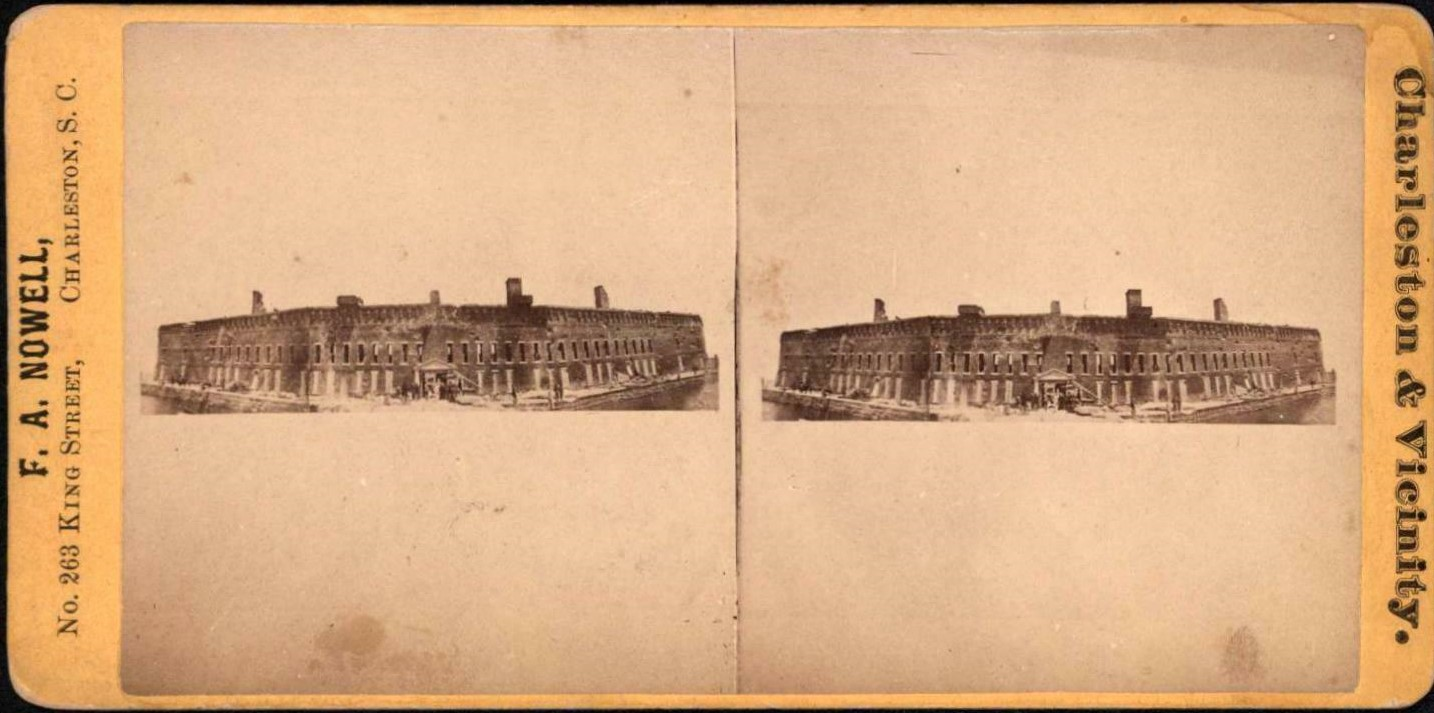
Fort Sumter was photographed in 1861 when it was still intact.

Early in the 19th century, South Carolina had owned several forts, namely Fort Moultrie, Castle Pinckney, and Fort Johnson, but ceded them, along with sites for the future erection of forts, to the United States in 1805. The forts were of questionable military value and costly to maintain, so when asked to cede them, the state complied. This was not the last time that South Carolina would cede forts to the United States; on December 17, 1836, South Carolina officially ceded all "right, title and, claim" to the site of Fort Sumter to the United States.

=== Civil War ===
==== Summary ====
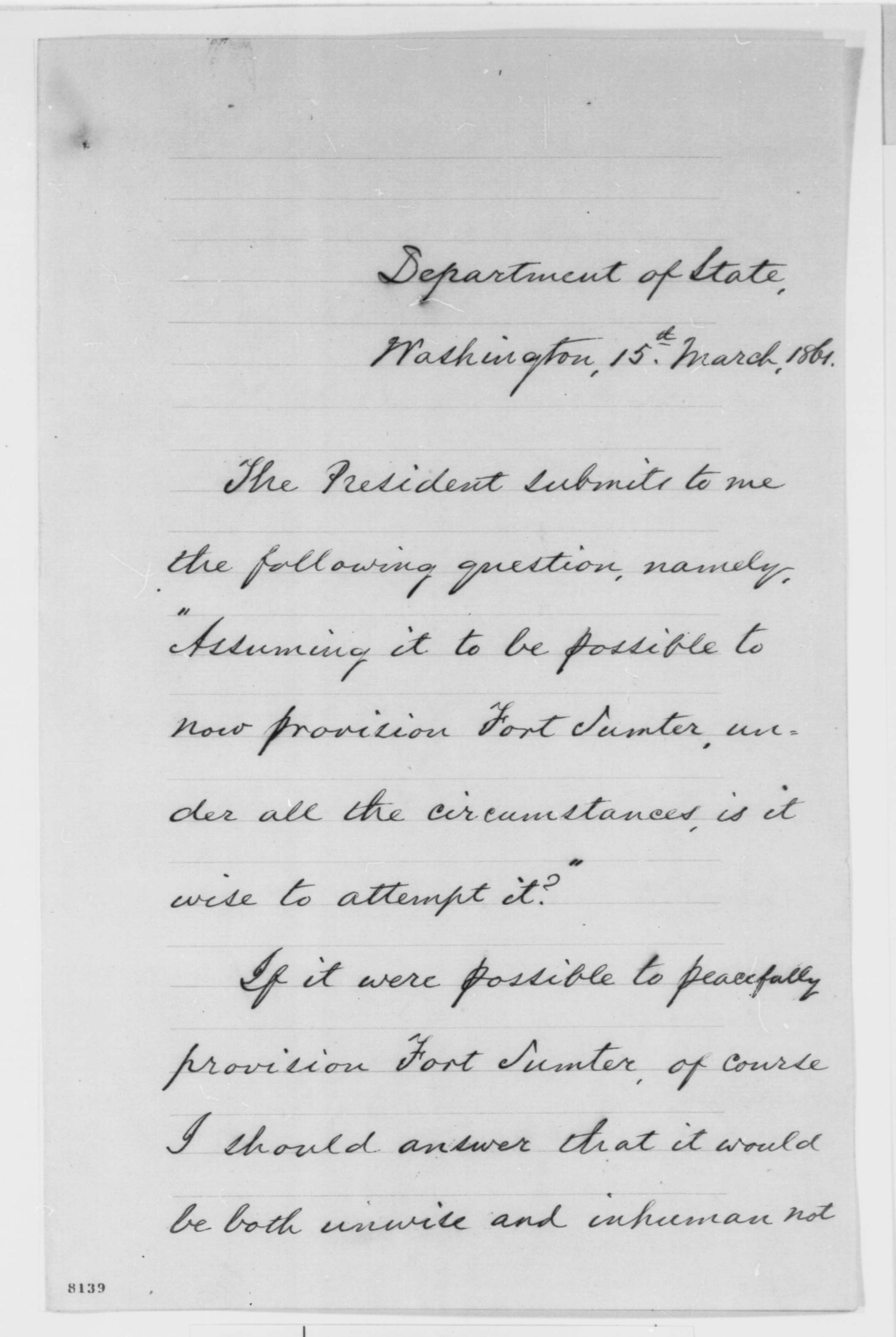
Letter from William H. Seward advising President Lincoln on the obstacles in resupplying Fort Sumter, March 1861

Fort Sumter is notable for two battles, the first of which began the American Civil War. It was one of a number of special forts planned after the War of 1812, combining high walls and heavy masonry, and classified as Third System, as a grade of structural integrity. Work started in 1829, but was incomplete by 1861, when the Civil War began.

The attack on Fort Sumter is generally taken as the beginning of the American Civil War—the first shots fired. Certainly it was so taken at the time—citizens of Charleston were celebrating. The First Battle of Fort Sumter began on April 12, 1861, when South Carolina Militia artillery fired from shore on the US Army garrison. These were (both sides agreed) the first shots of the war. The bombardment continued all day, watched by many happy civilians. The fort had been cut off from its supply line and surrendered the next day. Major Robert Anderson took the flag with him as they evacuated.

The Second Battle of Fort Sumter (September 8, 1863) was a failed attempt by the Union to retake the fort, dogged by a rivalry between army and navy commanders. Although the fort was reduced to rubble, it remained in Confederate hands until it was evacuated as General Sherman marched through South Carolina in February 1865.

A widely announced "End of the War" celebration took place at Fort Sumter on April 14, 1865. The now-Major General Anderson, though ill and retired, came to the ceremony and raised the flag. The assassination of President Lincoln, which occurred on the evening of that date, almost immediately overshadowed the festivities.

==== Preparing for war ====
On December 26, 1860, only six days after South Carolina seceded from the Union, U.S. Army Major Robert Anderson abandoned the indefensible Fort Moultrie, spiking its large guns, burning its gun carriages, and taking its smaller cannon with him. He secretly relocated companies E and H (127 men, 13 of them musicians) of the 1st U.S. Artillery to Fort Sumter on his own initiative, without orders from his superiors. He thought that providing a stronger defense would delay an attack by South Carolina militia. The fort was not yet complete and less than half of the cannon that should have been available were in place, due to military cuts by President James Buchanan.

In a letter delivered January 31, 1861, South Carolina Governor Pickens demanded of President Buchanan that he surrender Fort Sumter because "I regard that possession is not consistent with the dignity or safety of the State of South Carolina." Over the next few months repeated calls for evacuation of Fort Sumter from the government of South Carolina and then from Confederate Brigadier General P. G. T. Beauregard were ignored. Union attempts to resupply and reinforce the garrison were repulsed on January 9, 1861, when shots fired by cadets from the Citadel prevented the steamer Star of the West, hired to transport troops and supplies to Fort Sumter, from completing the task.

After realizing that Anderson's command would run out of food by April 15, 1861, President Lincoln ordered a fleet of ships, under the command of Gustavus V. Fox, to attempt entry into Charleston Harbor and supply Fort Sumter. The ships assigned were the steam sloops-of-war USS Pawnee and USS Powhatan, transporting motorized launches and about 300 sailors (secretly removed from the Charleston fleet to join in the forced reinforcement of Fort Pickens, Pensacola, FL); armed screw steamer USS Pocahontas; Revenue Cutter USRC Harriet Lane; steamer Baltic transporting about 200 troops, composed of companies C and D of the 2nd U.S. Artillery; and three hired tugboats with added protection against small arms fire to be used to tow troop and supply barges directly to Fort Sumter. By April 6, 1861, the first ships began to set sail for their rendezvous off the Charleston Bar. The first to arrive was Harriet Lane, on the evening of April 11, 1861.

==== First Battle of Fort Sumter ====
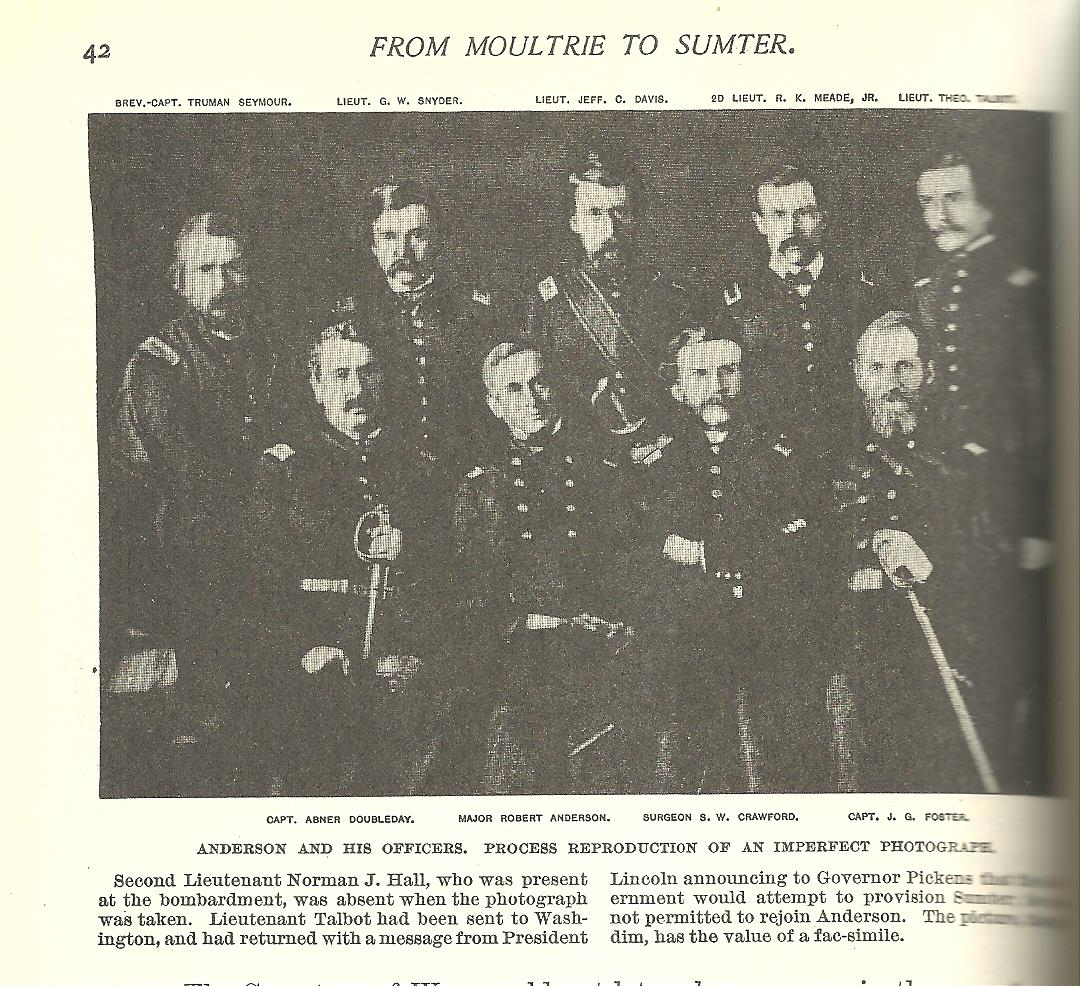
Major Anderson and His Officers prior to Bombardment of Ft Sumpter 1861

On Thursday, April 11, 1861, Beauregard sent three aides: Colonel James Chesnut, Jr., Captain Stephen D. Lee, and Lieutenant A. R. Chisolm, to demand the surrender of the fort. Anderson declined, and the aides returned to report to Beauregard. After Beauregard had consulted the Confederate Secretary of War, Leroy Walker, he sent the aides back to the fort and authorized Chesnut to decide whether the fort should be taken by force. The aides waited for hours while Anderson considered his alternatives and played for time. At about 3:00 a.m., when Anderson finally announced his conditions, Colonel Chesnut, after conferring with the other aides, decided that they were "manifestly futile and not within the scope of the instructions verbally given to us." The aides then left the fort and proceeded to the nearby Fort Johnson. There, Chesnut ordered the fort to open fire on Fort Sumter.

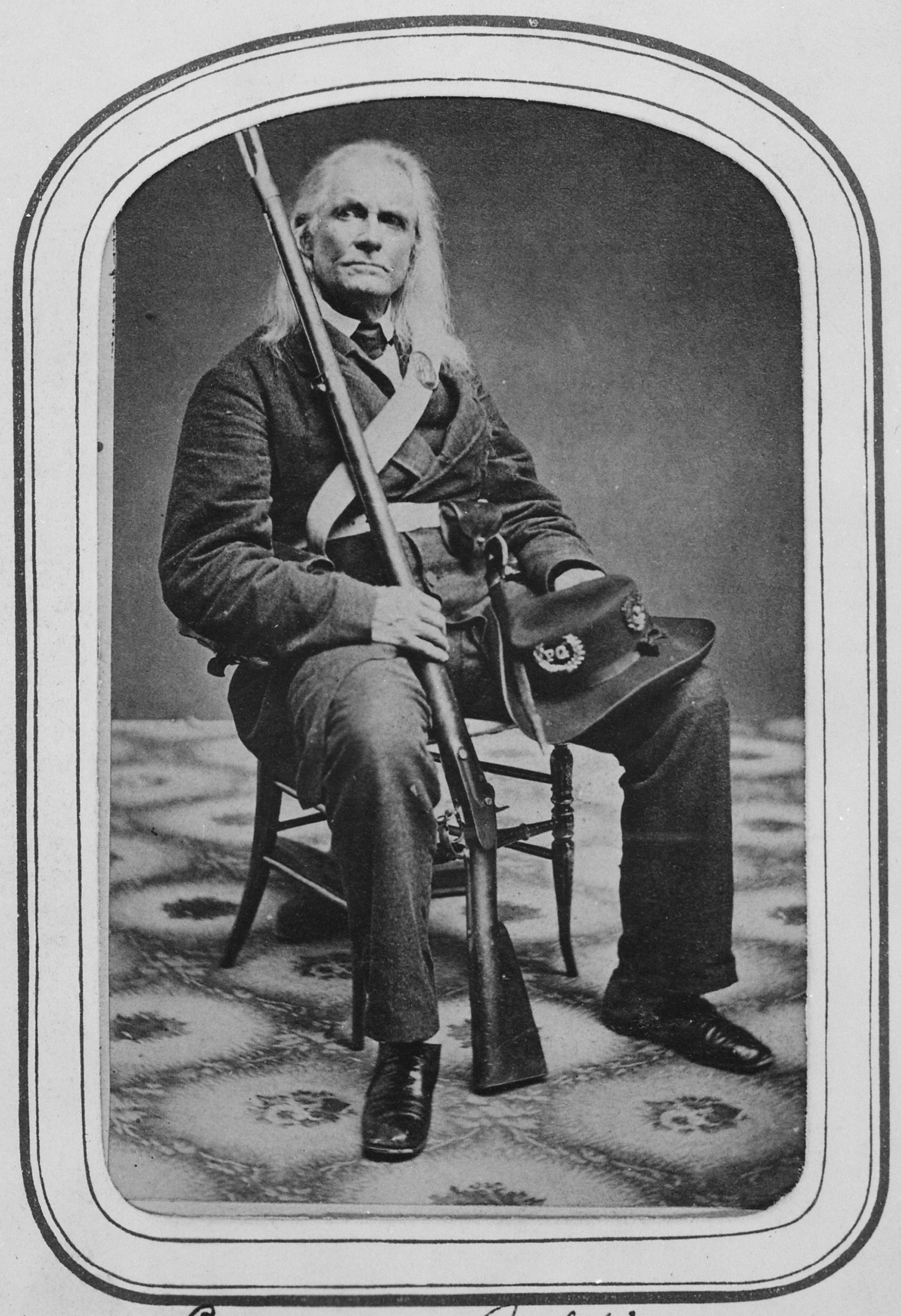
Edmund Ruffin in the uniform of the "Palmetto Guards" 1861

On Friday, April 12, 1861, at 4:30 a.m., Confederate batteries opened fire on the fort, firing for 34 straight hours. Edmund Ruffin, noted Virginian agronomist and secessionist, claimed that he fired the first shot on Fort Sumter. His story has been widely believed, but Lieutenant Henry S. Farley, commanding a battery of two 10-inch siege mortars on James Island, actually fired the first shot at 4:30 a.m.

No attempt was made to return fire for more than two hours. The fort's supply of ammunition was not suited for the task; also, there were no fuses for its explosive shells, which thus could not explode. Only solid iron balls could be used against the Confederate batteries. At about 7:00 a.m., Captain Abner Doubleday, the fort's second in command, was given the honor of firing the Union's first shot, in defense of the fort. He missed, in part because Major Anderson did not use the guns mounted on the highest tier—the barbette tier, where the guns could engage the Confederate batteries better, but where the gunners would be more exposed to Confederate fire. The firing continued all day. The Union fired slowly to conserve ammunition. At night, the fire from the fort stopped, but the Confederates still lobbed an occasional shell into Sumter. On Saturday, April 13, the fort was surrendered and evacuated. During the attack, the Union colors fell. Lt. Norman J. Hall risked life and limb to put them back up, burning off his eyebrows permanently. A Confederate soldier bled to death having been wounded by a misfiring cannon. One Union soldier died and another was mortally wounded during the 47th shot of a 100-shot salute, allowed by the Confederacy. Afterward, the salute was shortened to 50 shots. Accounts, such as in the famous diary of Mary Chesnut, describe Charleston residents along what is now known as The Battery, sitting on balconies and drinking salutes to the start of the hostilities.

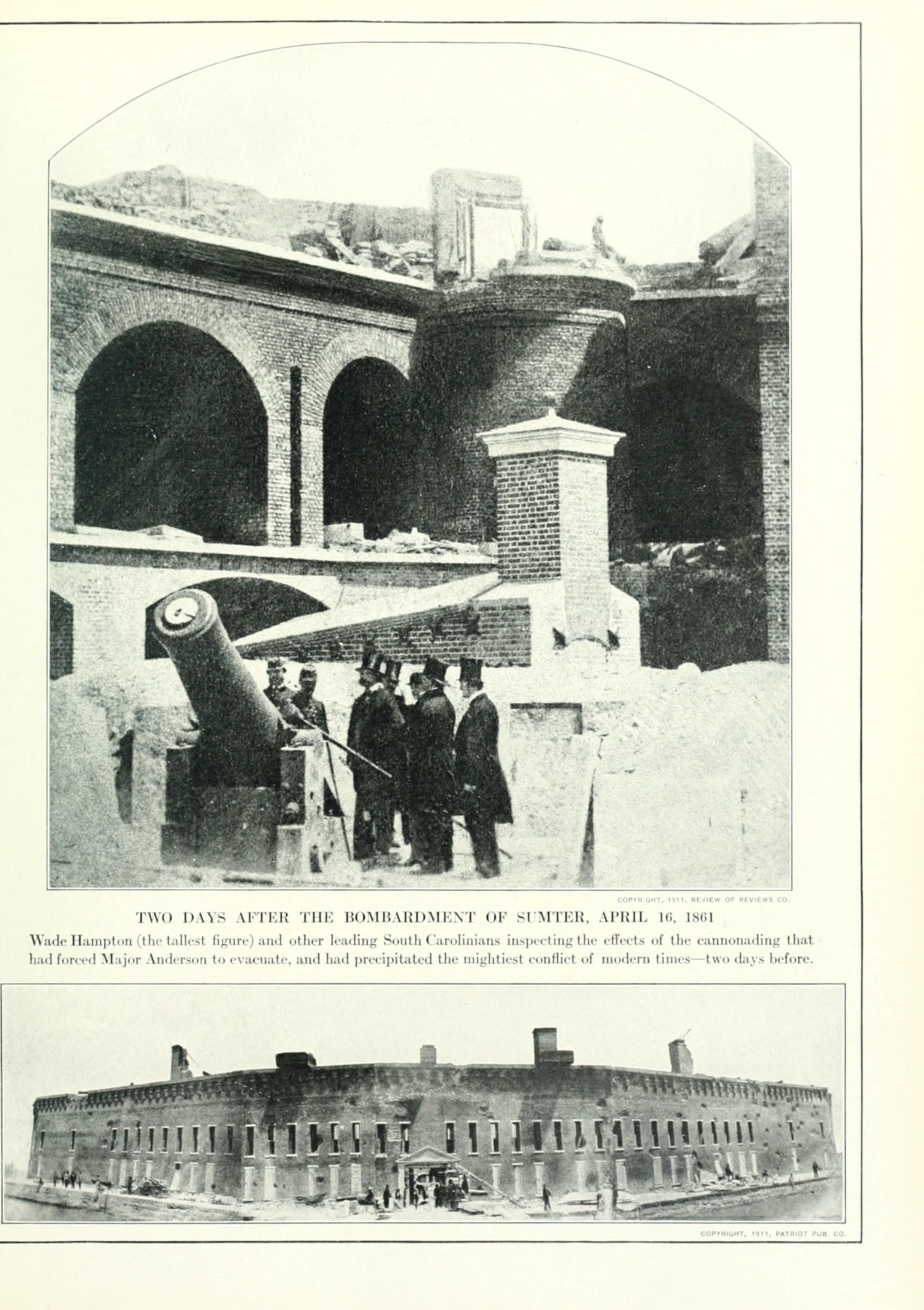
[Top] A photographic view of the Hot shot Furnace at right shoulder angle and a 10-in. columbard cannon pointing to Charleston;[Bottom] Exterior view of Gorge and Sally Port Ft Sumter April 1861 after its surrender

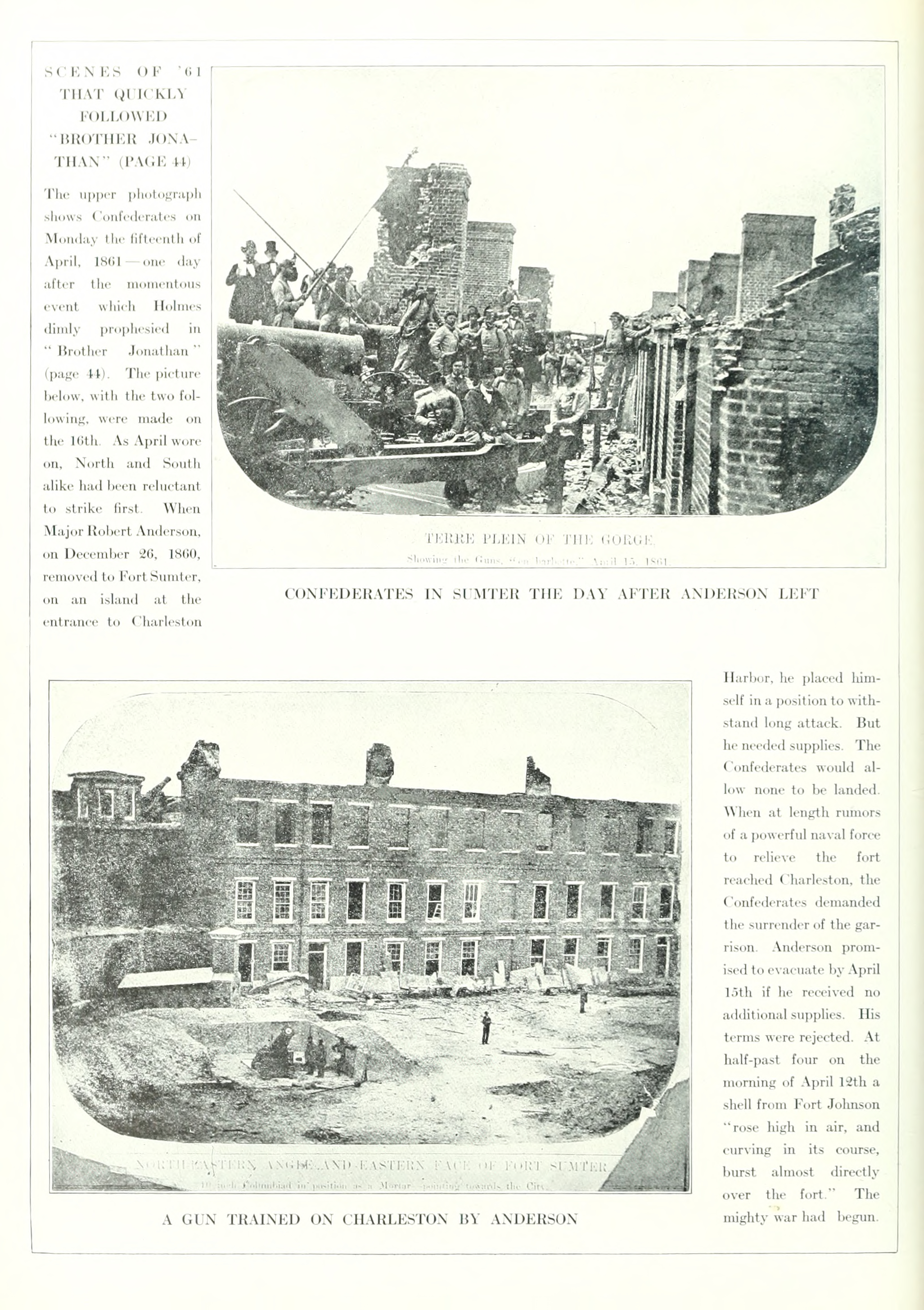
Views of Ft Sumter; [Bottom] View of right angle

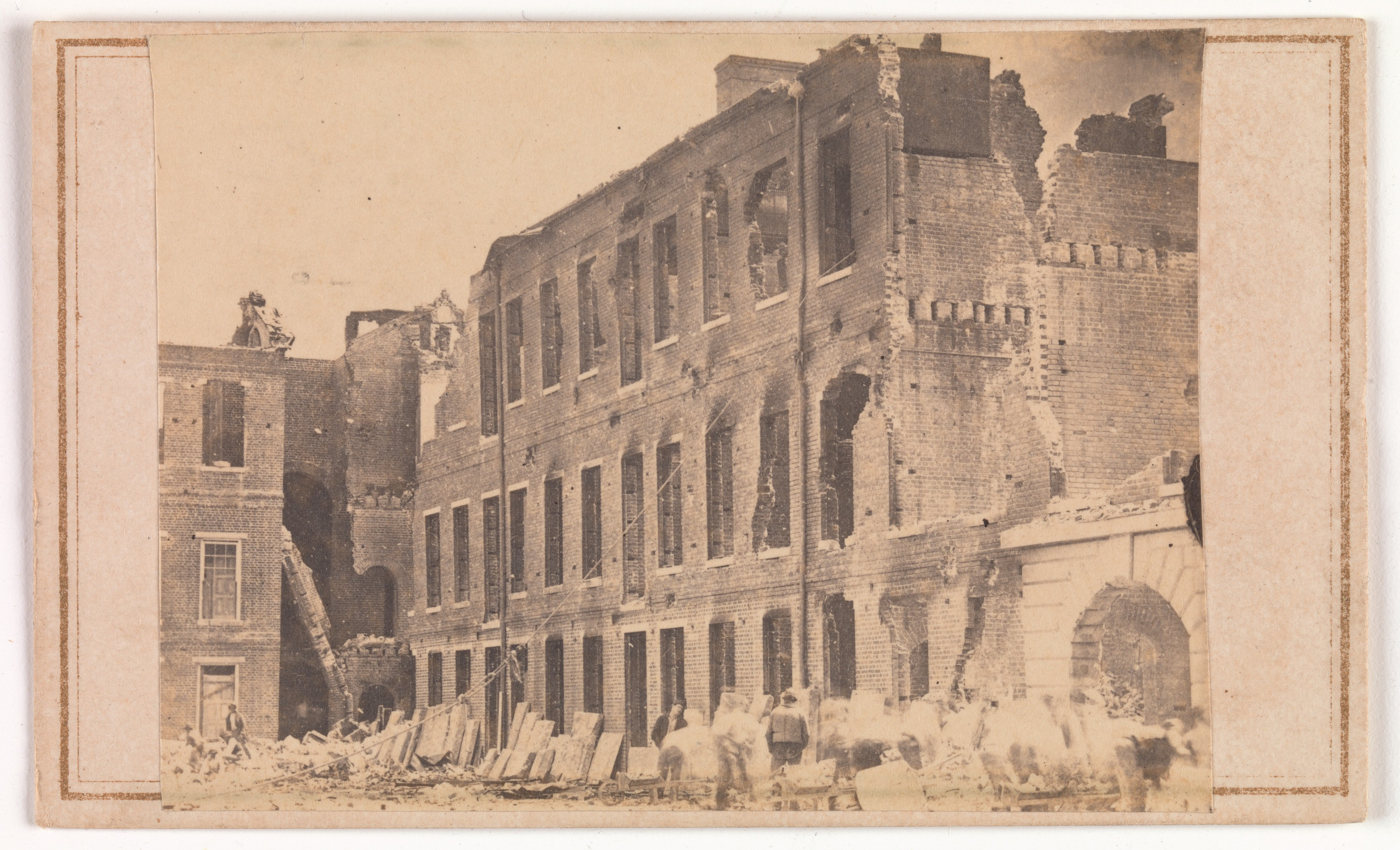
Right angle gorge of Ft Sumter-Sally port at right

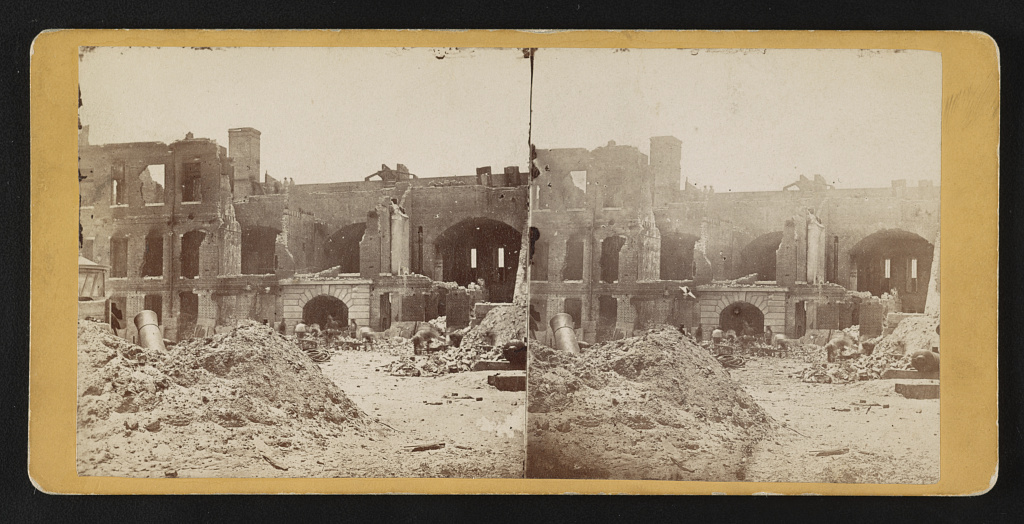
View of the Gorge and Sally Port

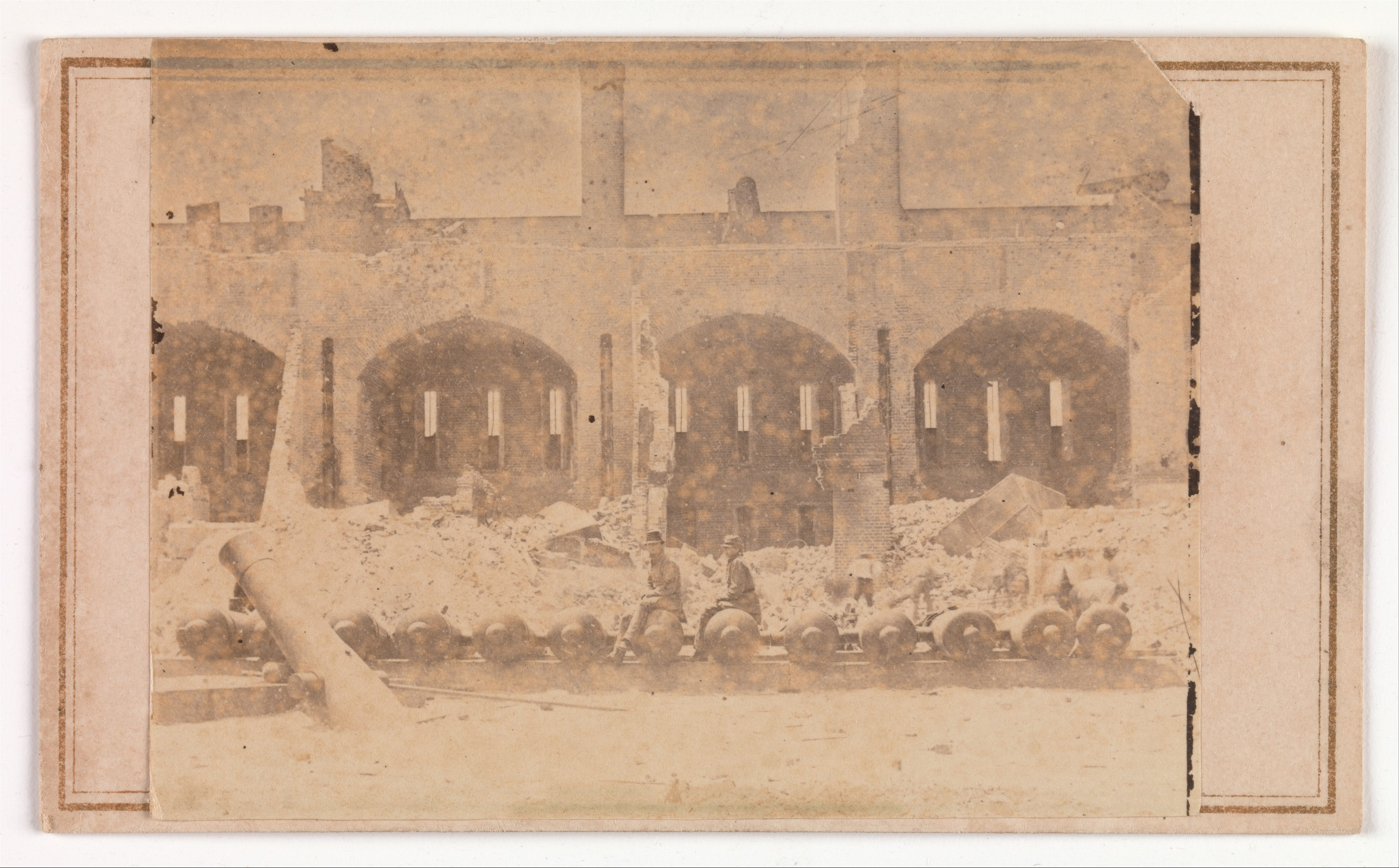
View of western part of Gorge

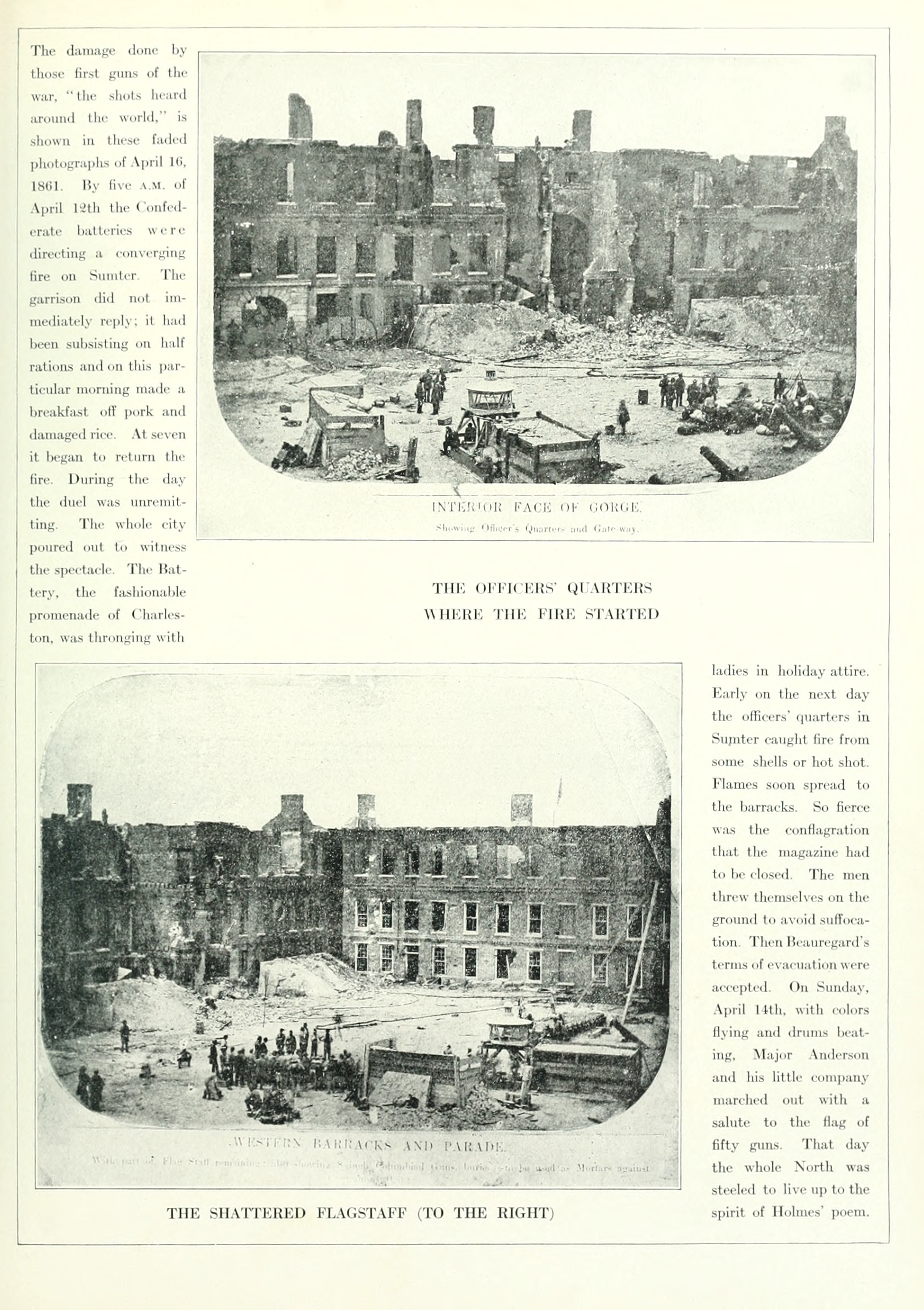
[Top] View of gorge and Sally port; [Bottom] Left gorge Angle

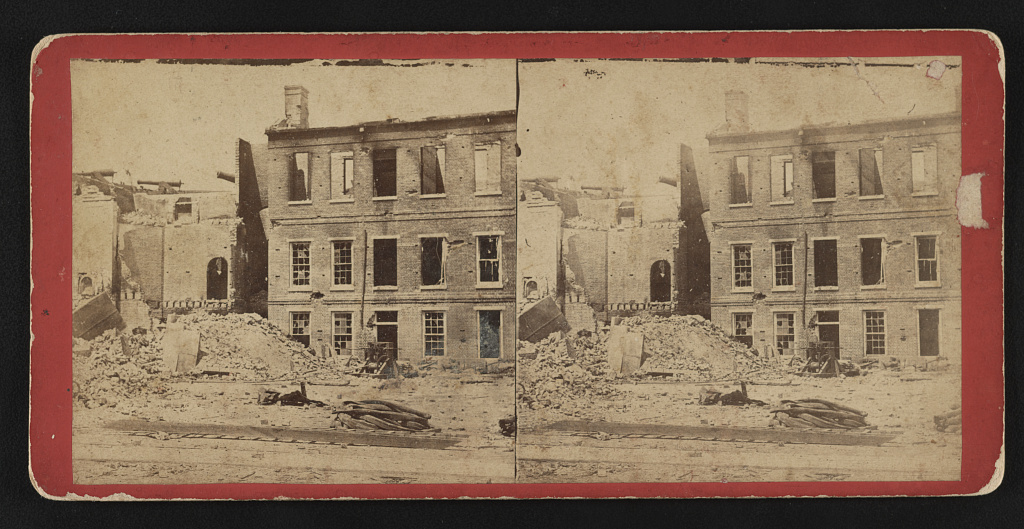
View of Left gorge angle Sally Port would be at far left

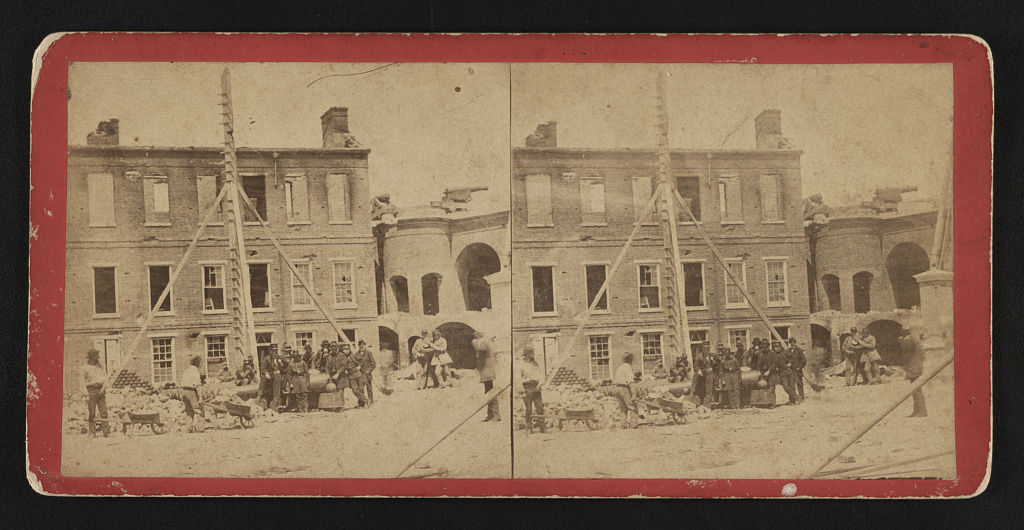
View of Left flank

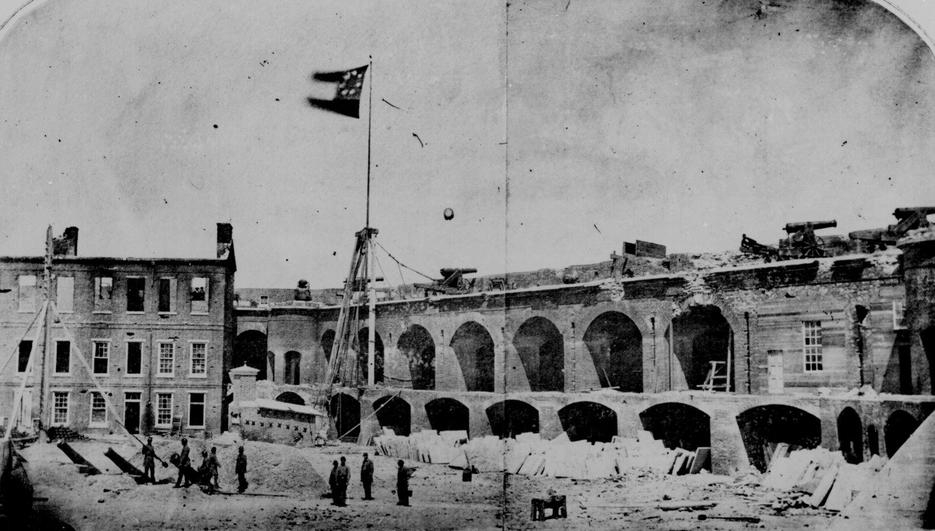
Panormanic View of Left shoulder Angle at left with a 2nd Hot Shot furnace and Left face at right; Ft Sumter 1861; flying the Confederate Flag

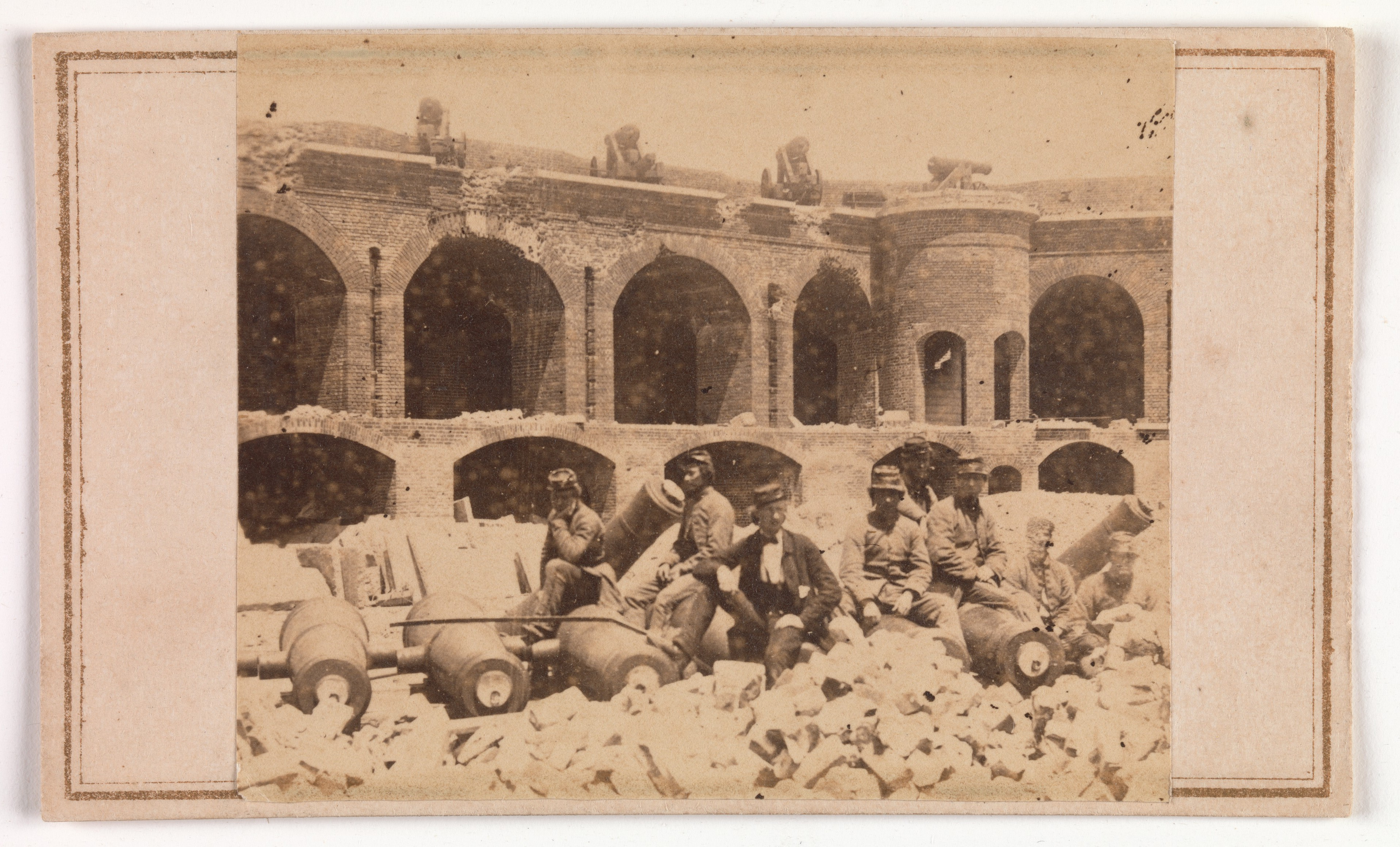
At Left North west casemates [left angle]; at right can be seen the start of the right angle

The Fort Sumter Flag became a popular patriotic symbol after Major Anderson returned North with it. The Star of the West took all the garrison members to New York City. There they were welcomed and honored with a parade on Broadway.

==== Union siege of Fort Sumter ====
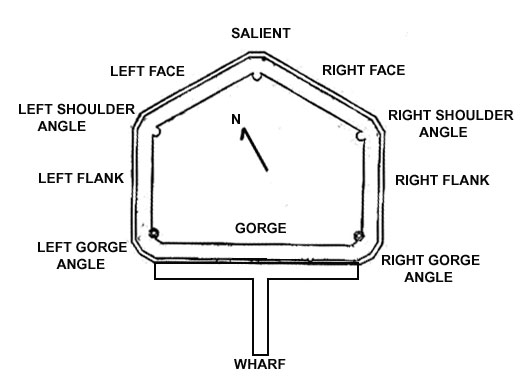
Drawing of Fort Sumter

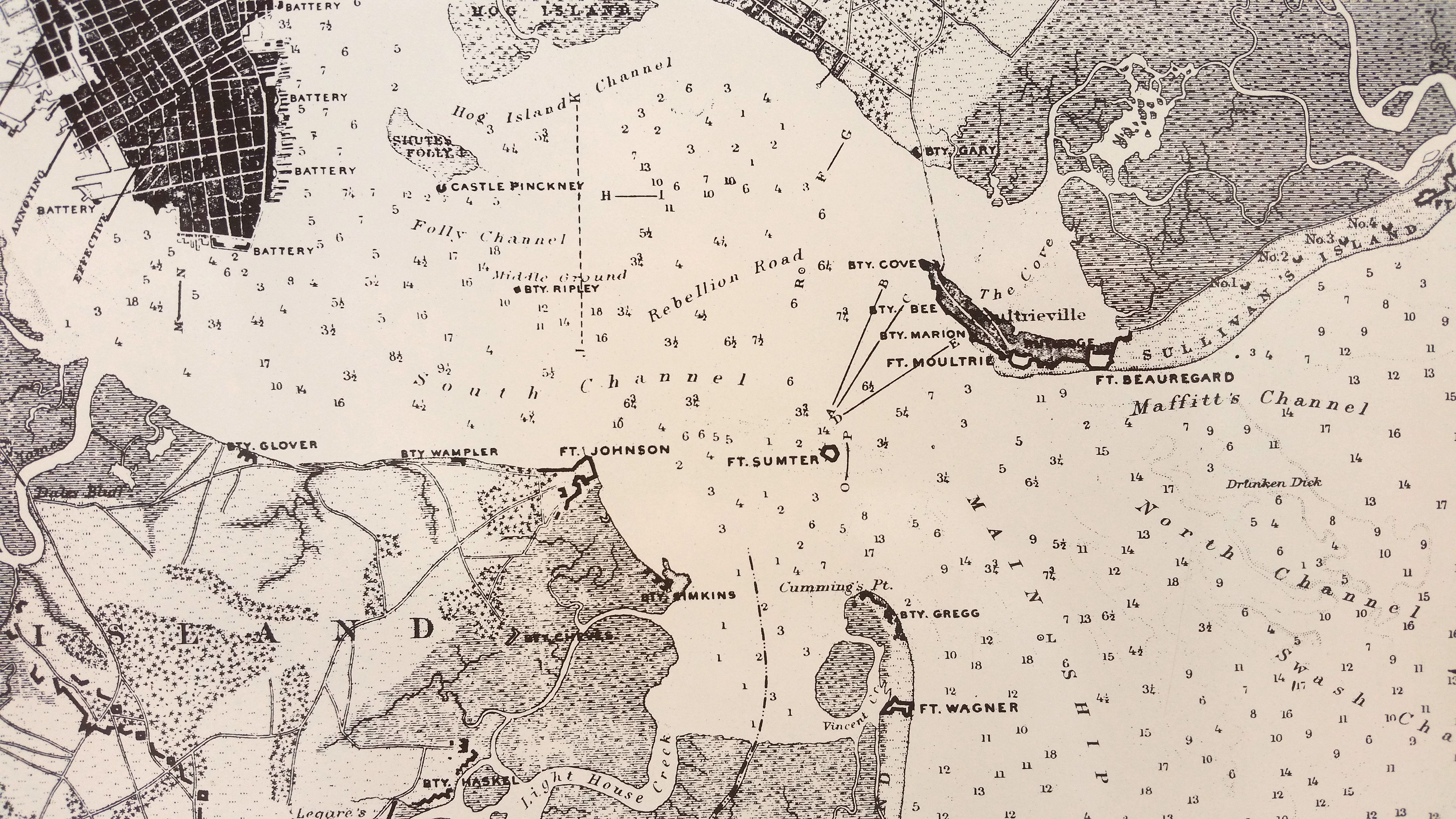
Fort Sumter National Monument marker of the Map of Charleston Harbor defenses

Union efforts to retake Charleston Harbor began on April 7, 1863, when Rear Admiral Samuel Francis Du Pont, commander of the South Atlantic Blockading Squadron, led the ironclad frigate New Ironsides, the tower ironclad Keokuk, and the monitors Weehawken, Passaic, Montauk, Patapsco, Nantucket, Catskill, and Nahant in an attack on the harbor's defenses. (The 1863 Battle of Fort Sumter was the largest deployment of monitors in action up to that time.) The attack was unsuccessful: the Union's best ship, USS New Ironsides never effectively engaged, and the ironclads fired only 154 rounds, while receiving 2,209 from the Confederate defenders (Wise 1994, p. 30). Due to damage received in the attack, the USS Keokuk sank the next day, 1,400 yards (1,300 m) off the southern tip of Morris Island. Over the next month, working at night to avoid the attention of the Federal squadron, the Confederates salvaged Keokuk's two eleven-inch Dahlgren guns (Ripley 1984, pp. 93–96). One of the Dahlgren guns was promptly placed in Fort Sumter.

The Confederates, in the meantime, were strengthening Fort Sumter. A workforce of just under 500 enslaved Africans, under the supervision of Confederate army engineers, were filling casemates with sand, protecting the gorge wall with sandbags, and building new traverse, blindages, and bombproofs. Some of Fort Sumter's artillery had been removed, but 40 pieces still were mounted. Fort Sumter's heaviest guns were mounted on the barbette, the fort's highest level, where they had wide angles of fire and could fire down on approaching ships. The barbette was also more exposed to enemy gunfire than the casemates in the two lower levels of the fort.

A special military decoration, known as the Gillmore Medal, was later issued to all Union service members who had performed duty at Fort Sumter under the command of Major-General Quincy Adams Gillmore.

=== Fort artillery ===
Fort Sumter Armaments, August 17, 1863
Location	Armament
Left flank barbette	Two 10-inch (250 mm) columbiads
Left face barbette	Two 10-inch (250 mm) columbiads, two 8-inch (200 mm) columbiads, four 42-pounders
Left face, first tier casemates	Two 8-inch (200 mm) shell guns
Right face barbette	Two 10-inch (250 mm) columbiads, five rifled and banded 42-pounders
Right face, first tier casemates	Two 32-pounders
Right flank barbette	One XI-inch Dahlgren (From USS Keokuk), four 10-inch (250 mm) columbiads, one 8-inch (200 mm) Columbiad, one rifled 42-pounder, one 8-inch (200 mm) Brooke
Gorge barbette	Five rifled and banded 42-pounders, one 24-pounder
Salient, second tier casemates	Three rifled and banded 42-pounders
Parade	Two 10-inch (250 mm) seacoast mortars

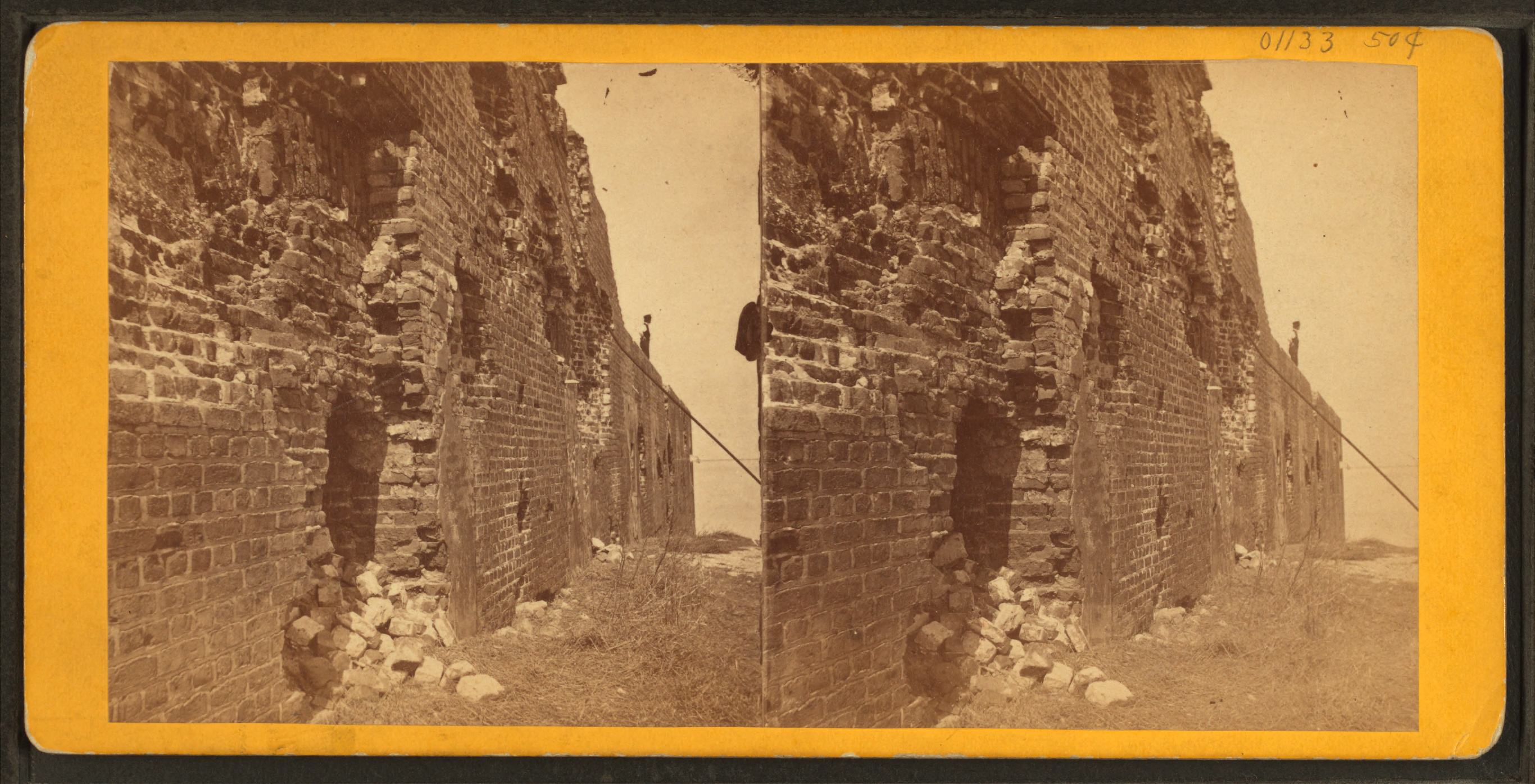
East Face of Ft Sumter 1863

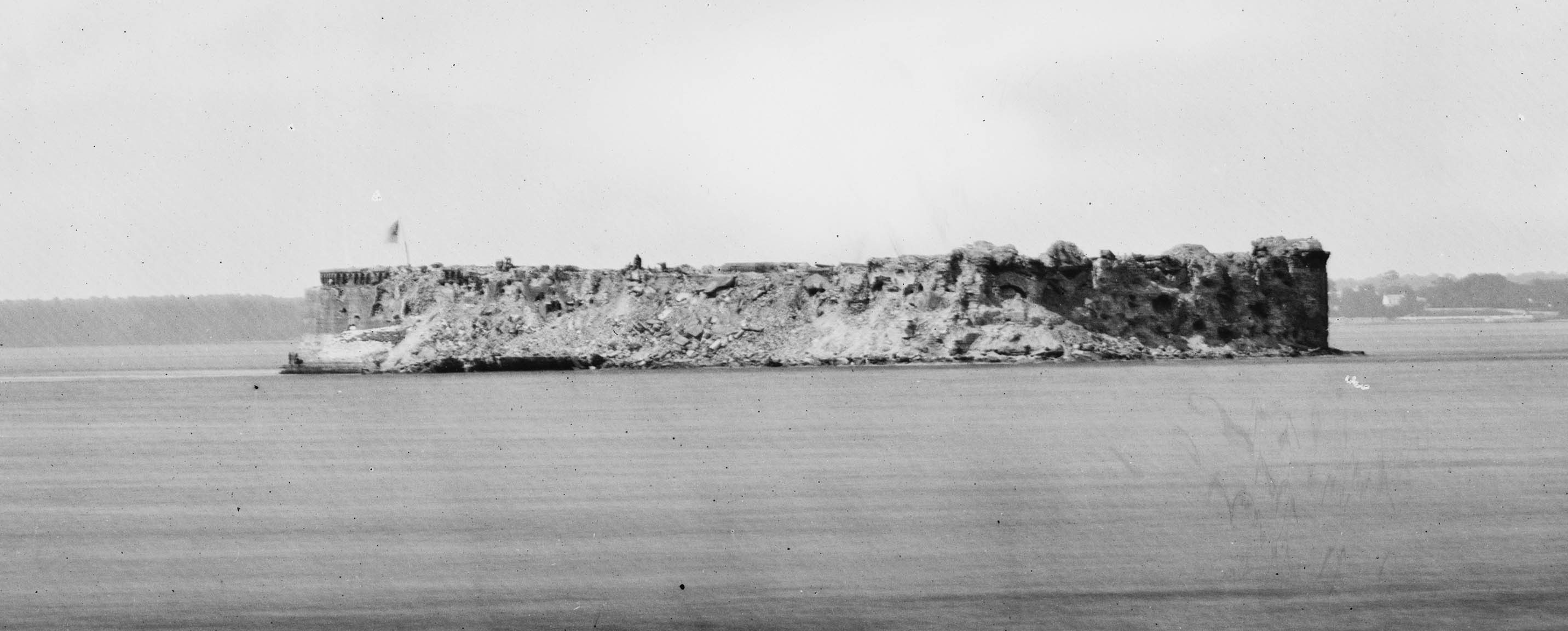
View of Confederate-held Fort Sumter, August 23, 1863

George Cook, half stereo of Federal ironclads firing on Fort Moultrie, September 8, 1863 (click to enlarge) – The Valentine, Richmond, Va.

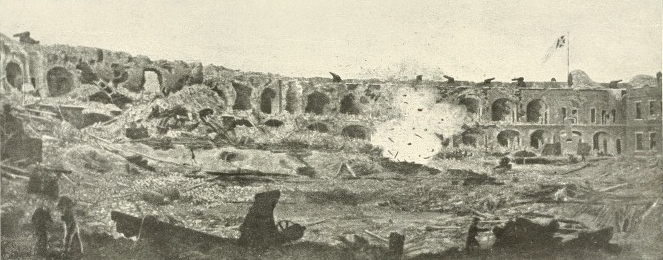
Lt. John R. Key's (CSA) "exploding shell" painting, of the interior of Fort Sumter – The Valentine, Richmond, Va.

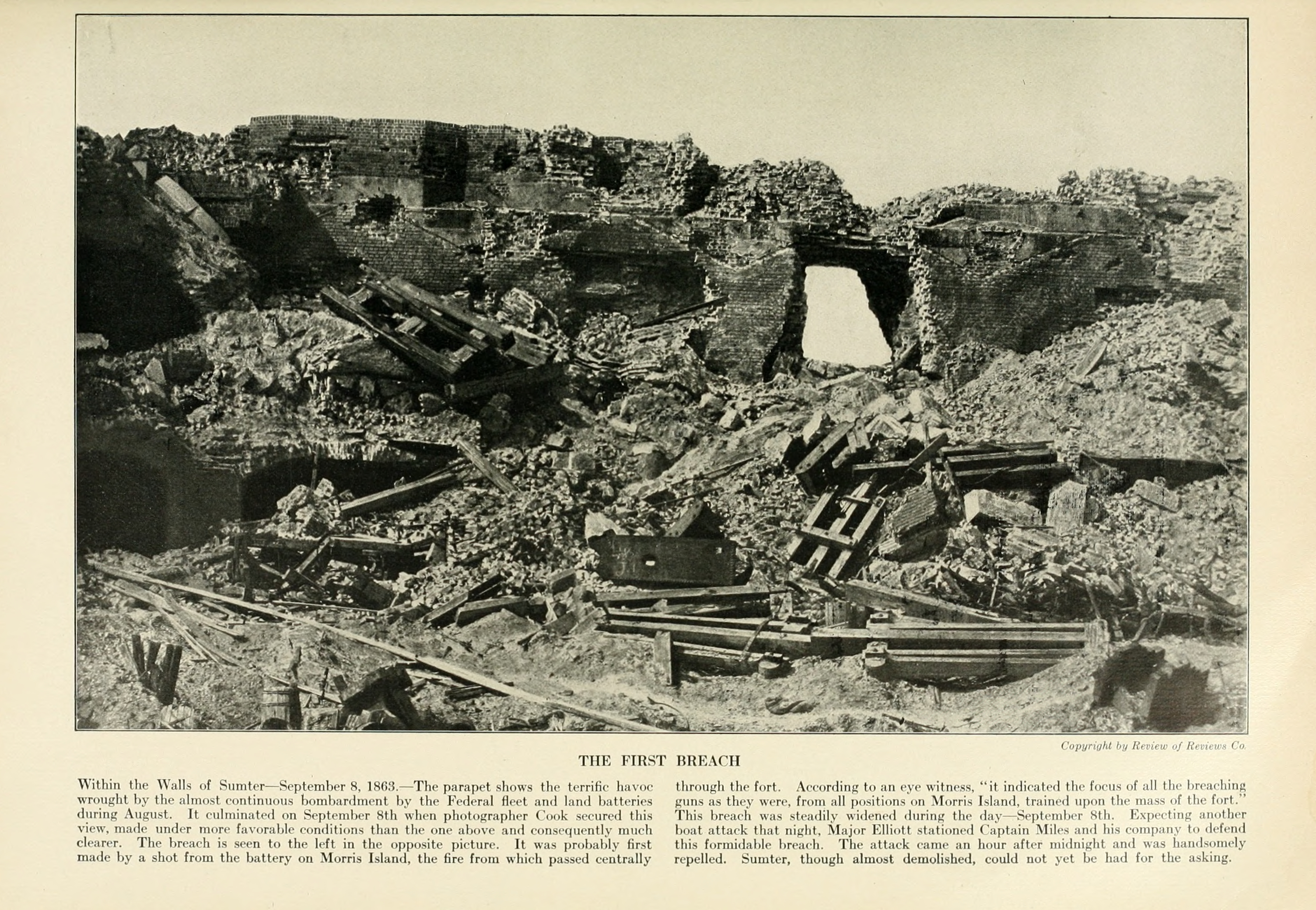
The first breach after the bombardment of September 8, 1863

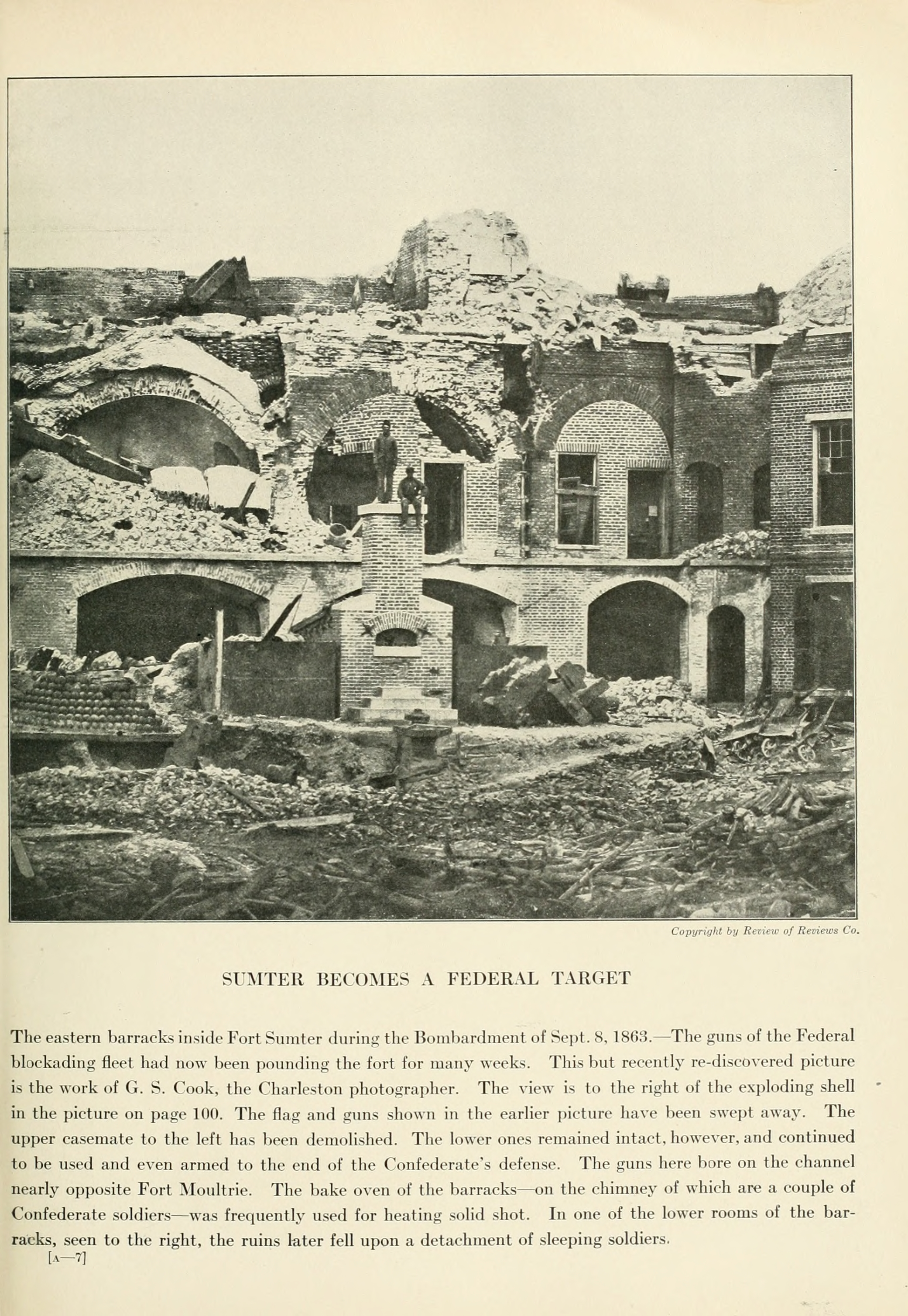
C.S. Cook picture of Ft Sumter after the bombardment September 28, 1863 showing the "Hot shot" Furnace at left and the Barracks at right

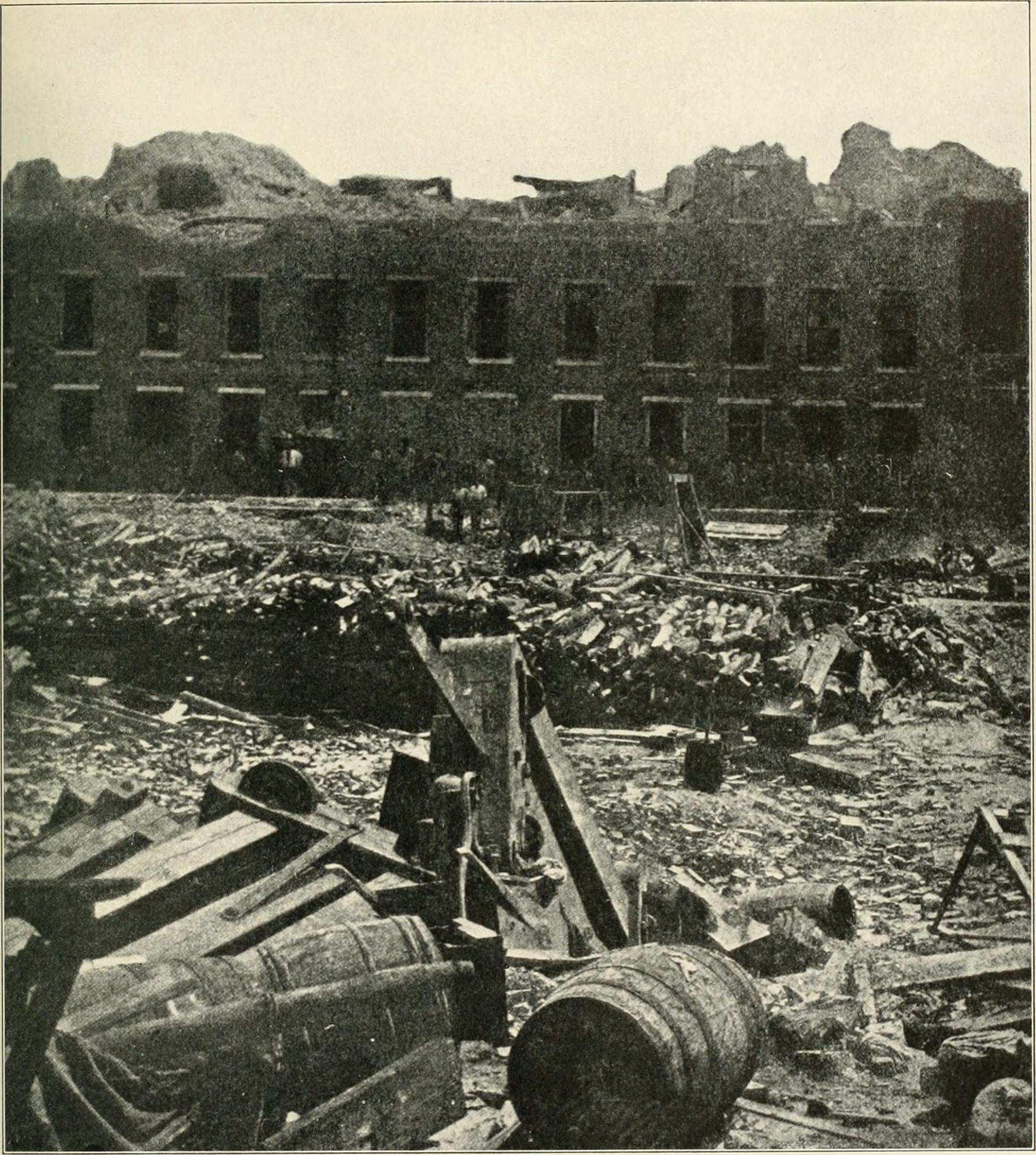
Interior View of Fort Sumter

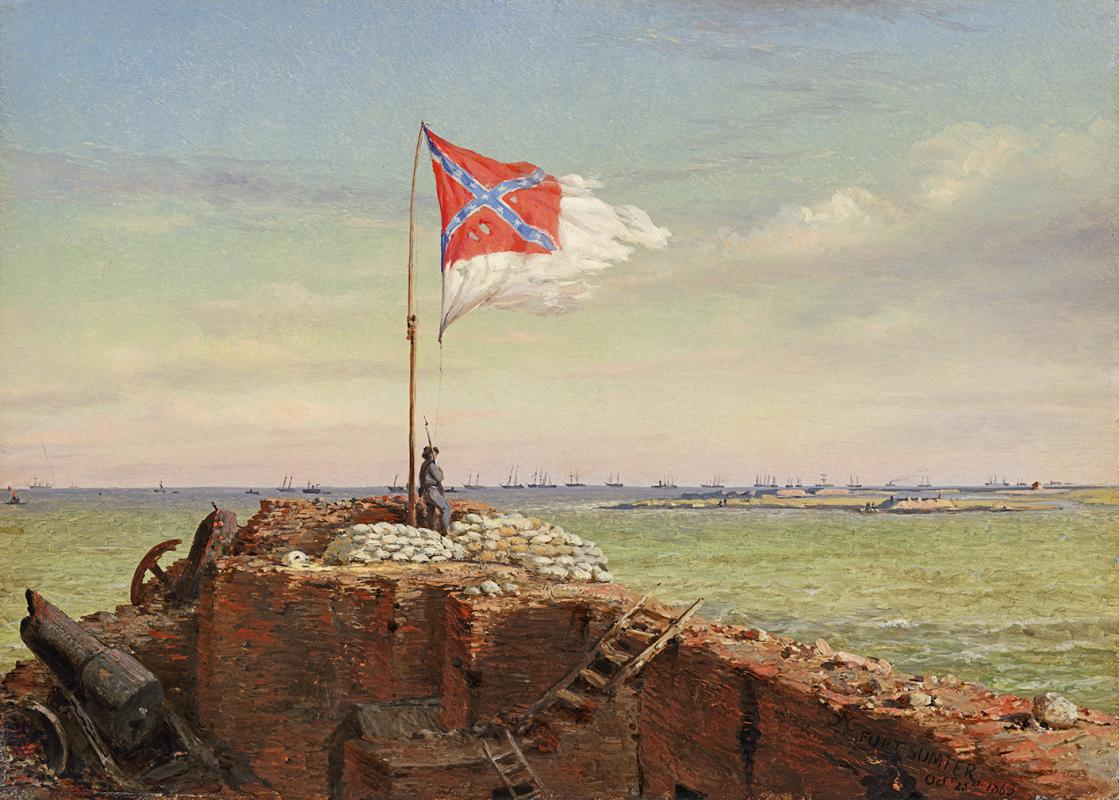
The Flag of Sumter, October 20, 1863

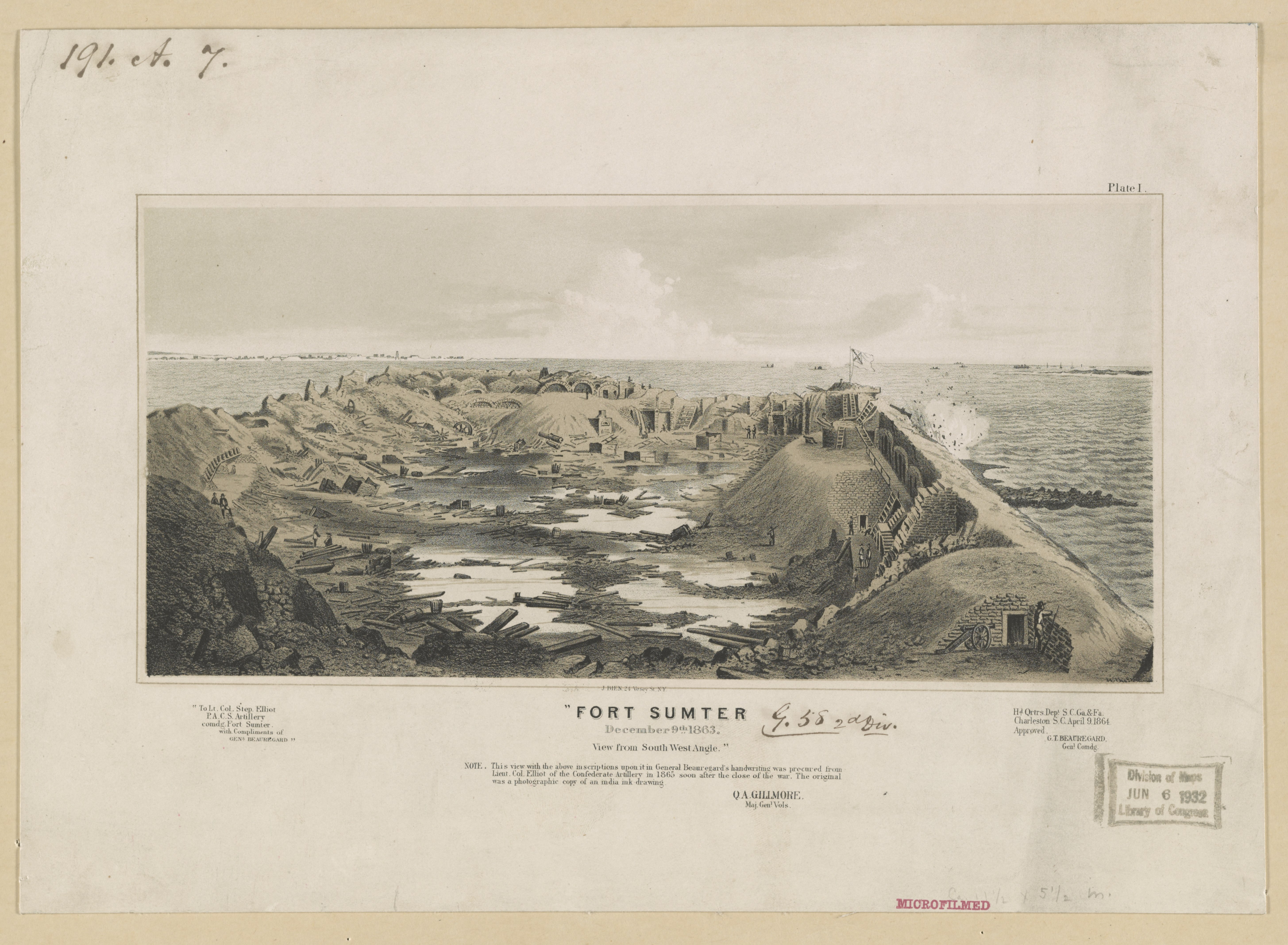
Ft Sumter from the west angle December 9, 1863

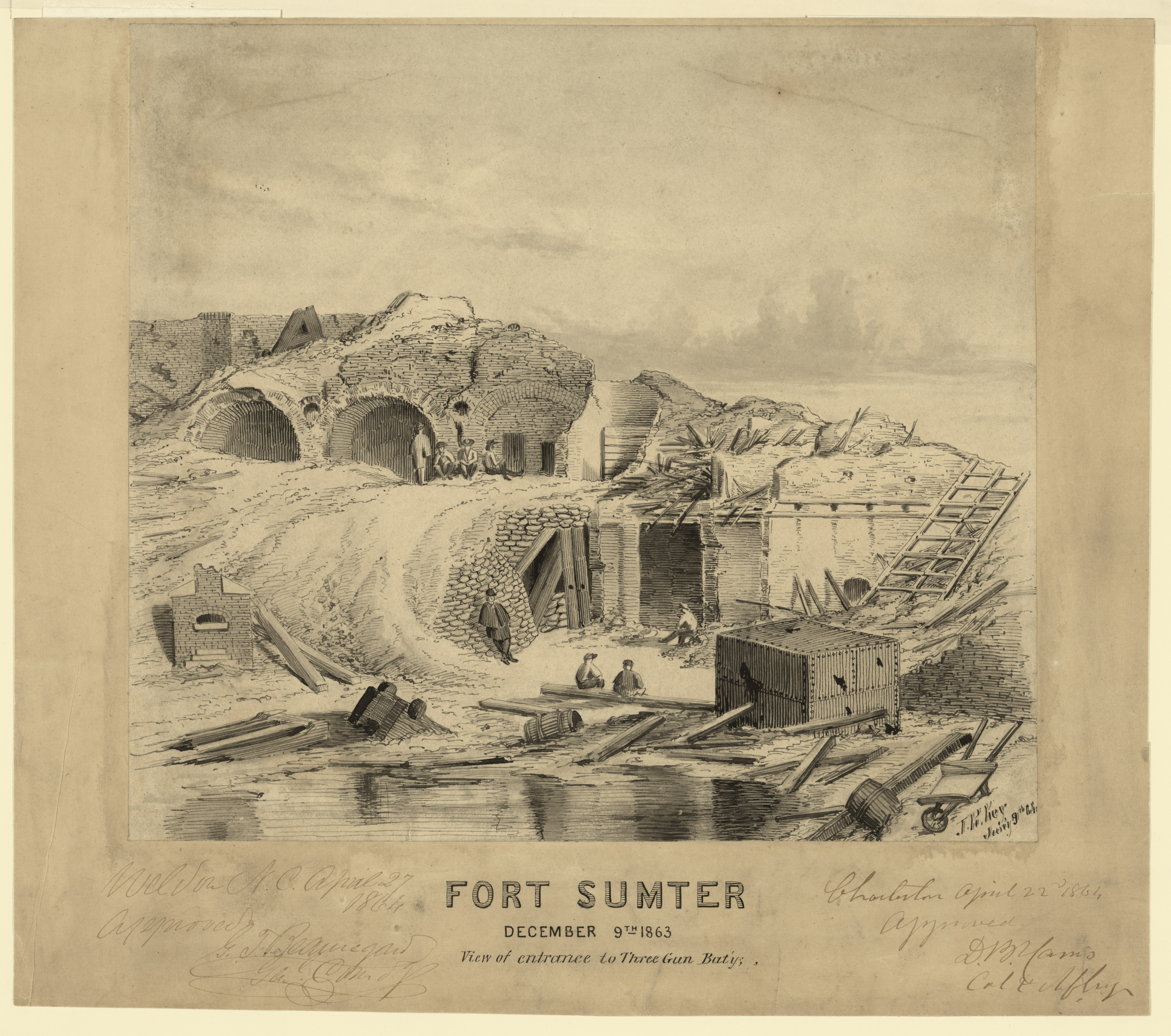
Ft Sumter View of entrance to Three Gun Bat'y December 9, 1863

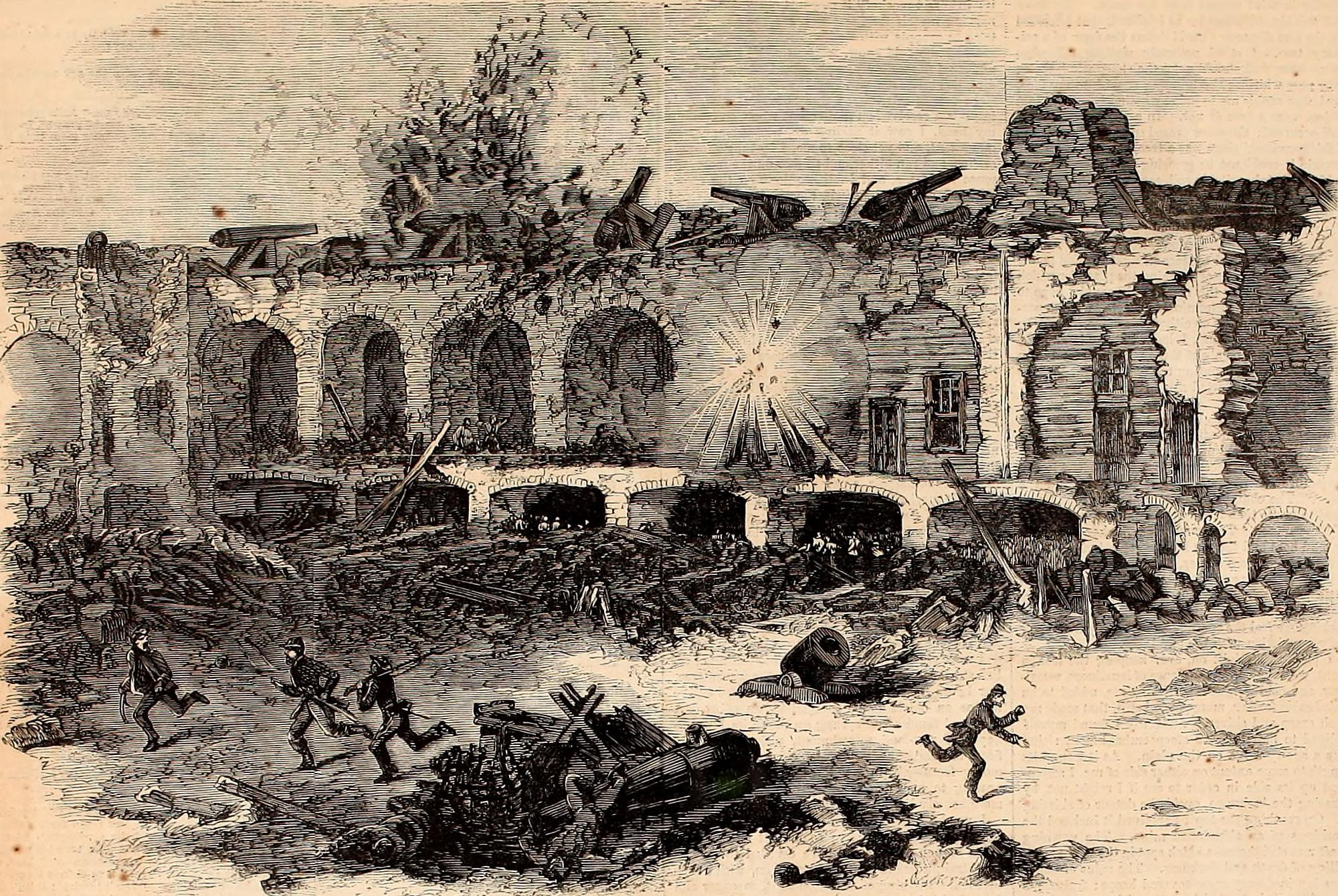
1864 sketch of bombardment of Ft Sumter

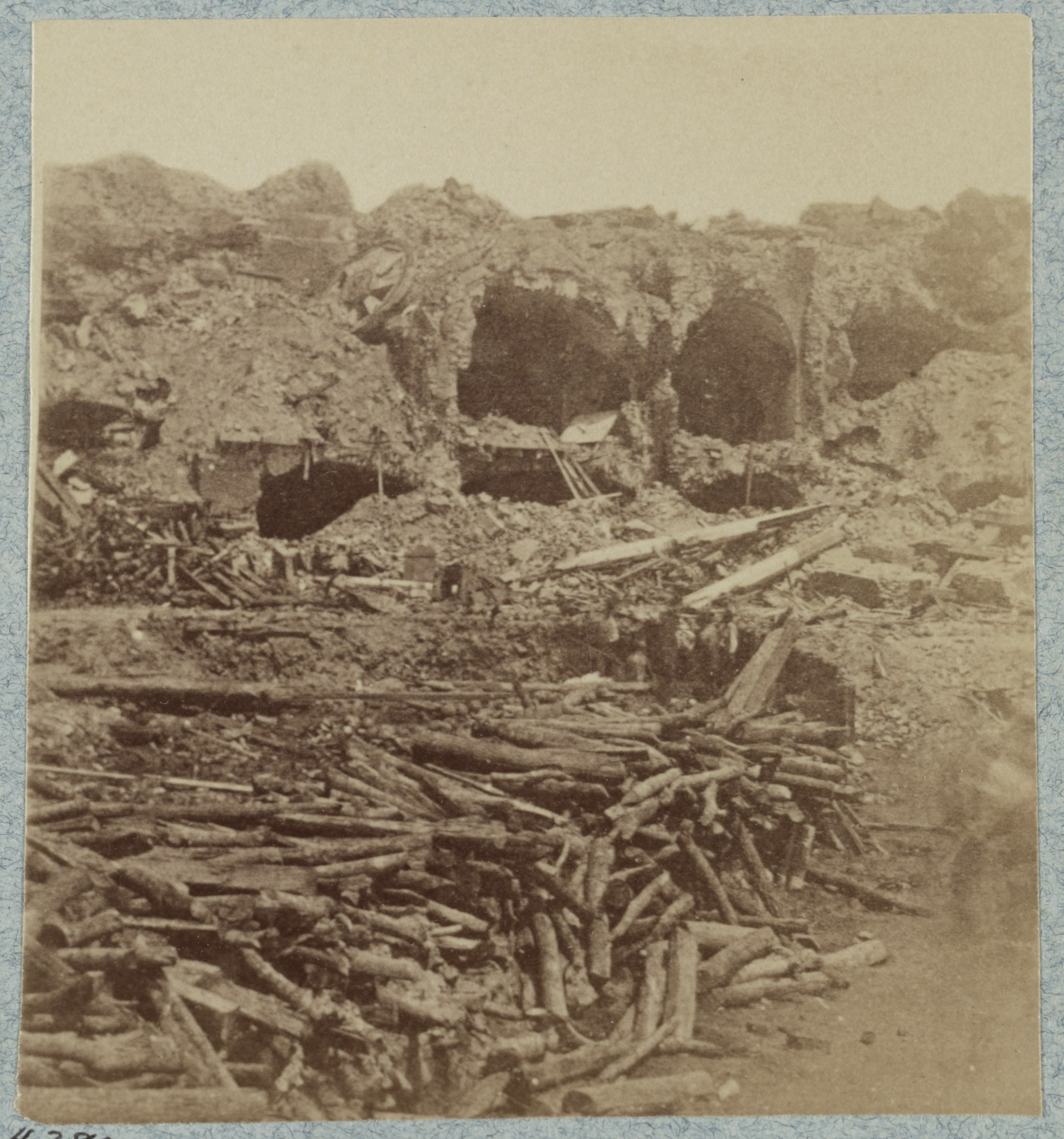
Interior View of Fort Sumter, taken by a Confederate photographer, 1864 [1863]

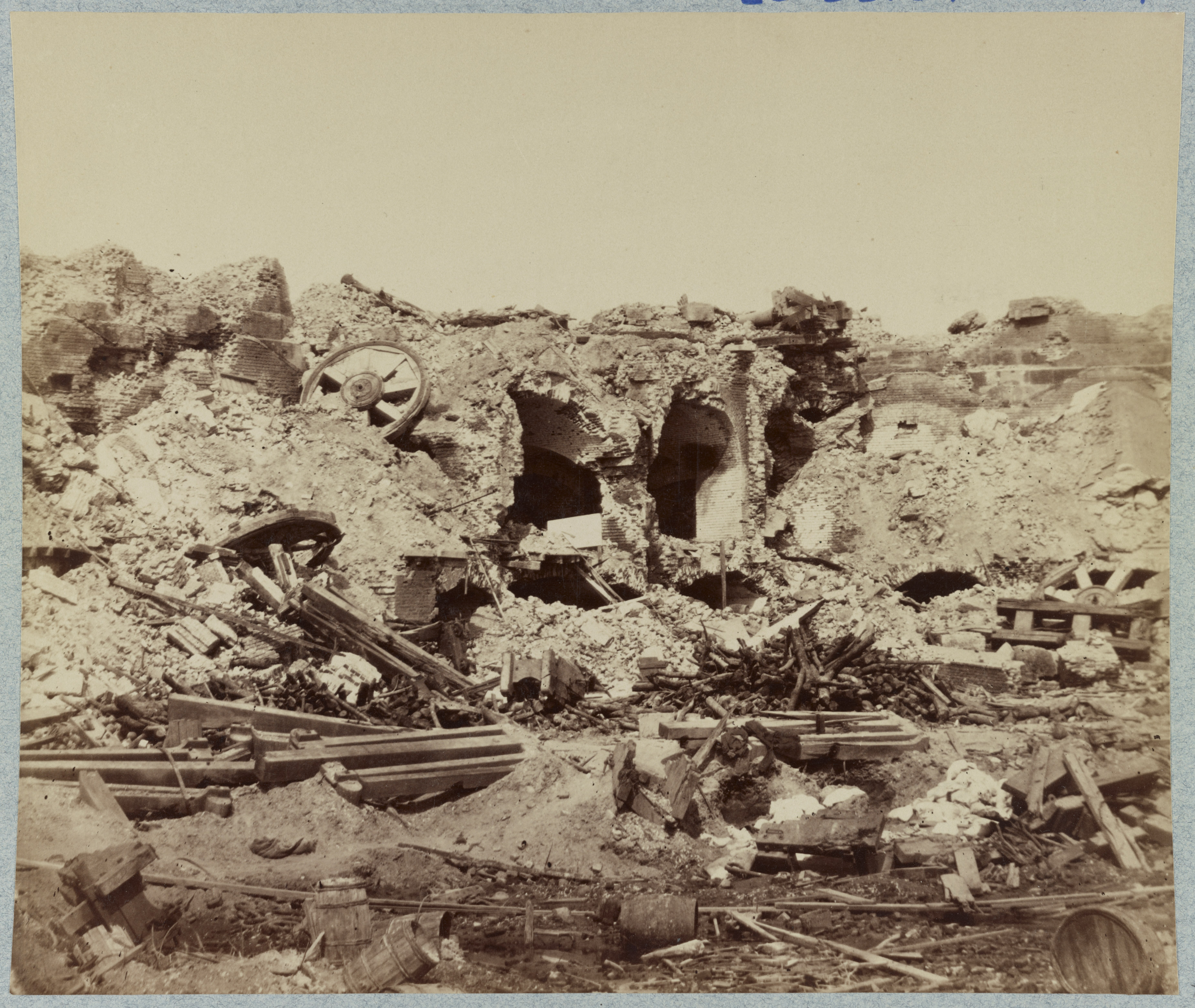
Interior View of Fort Sumter, taken by a Confederate photographer

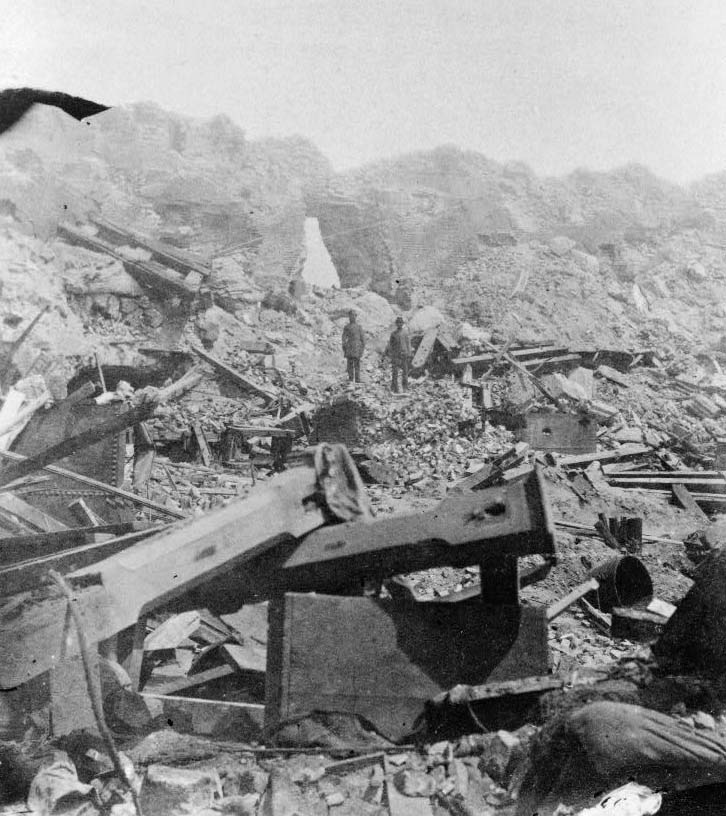
Interior View of Fort Sumter, taken by a Confederate photographer, 1864.

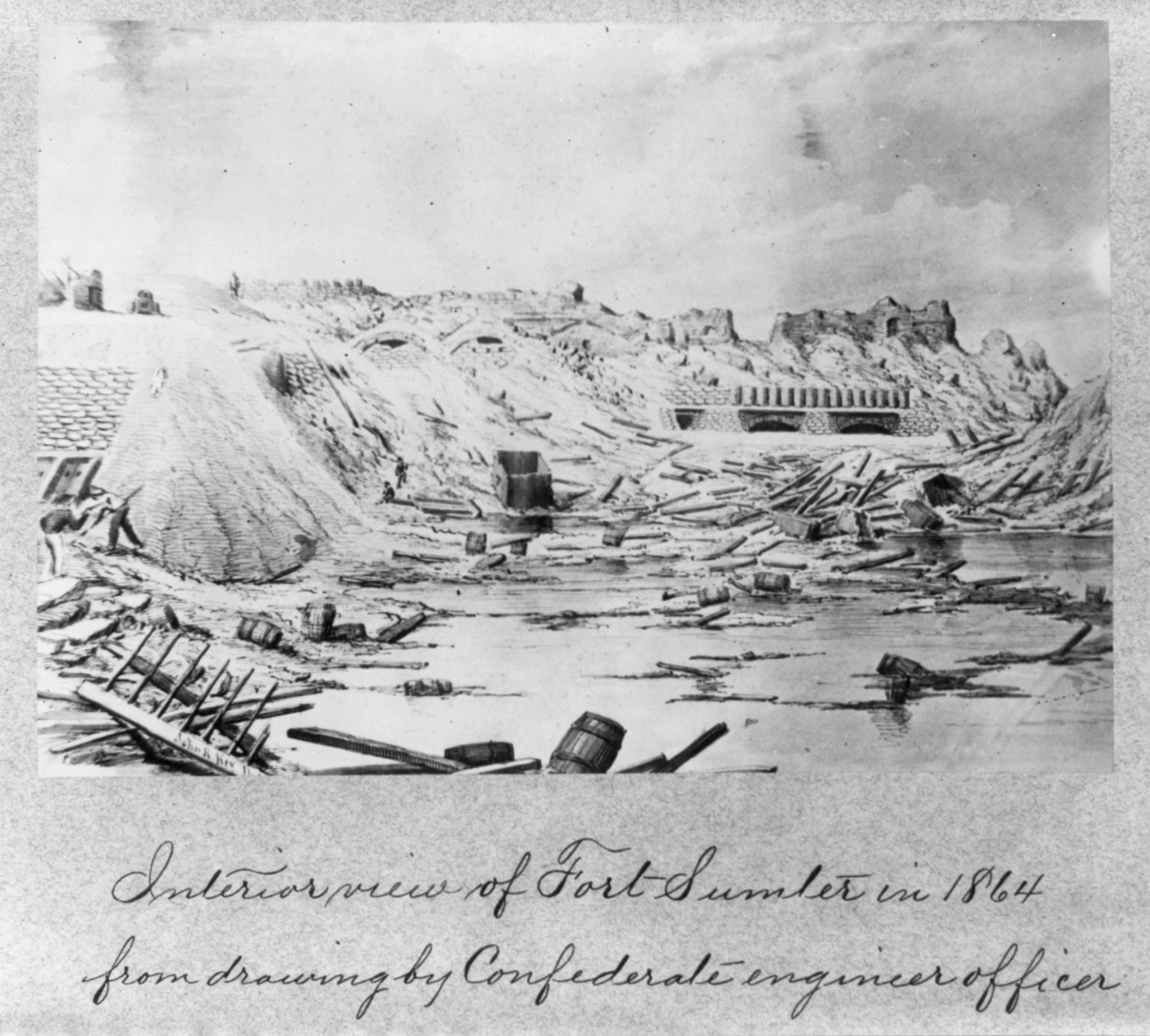
Interior View of Fort Sumter 1864

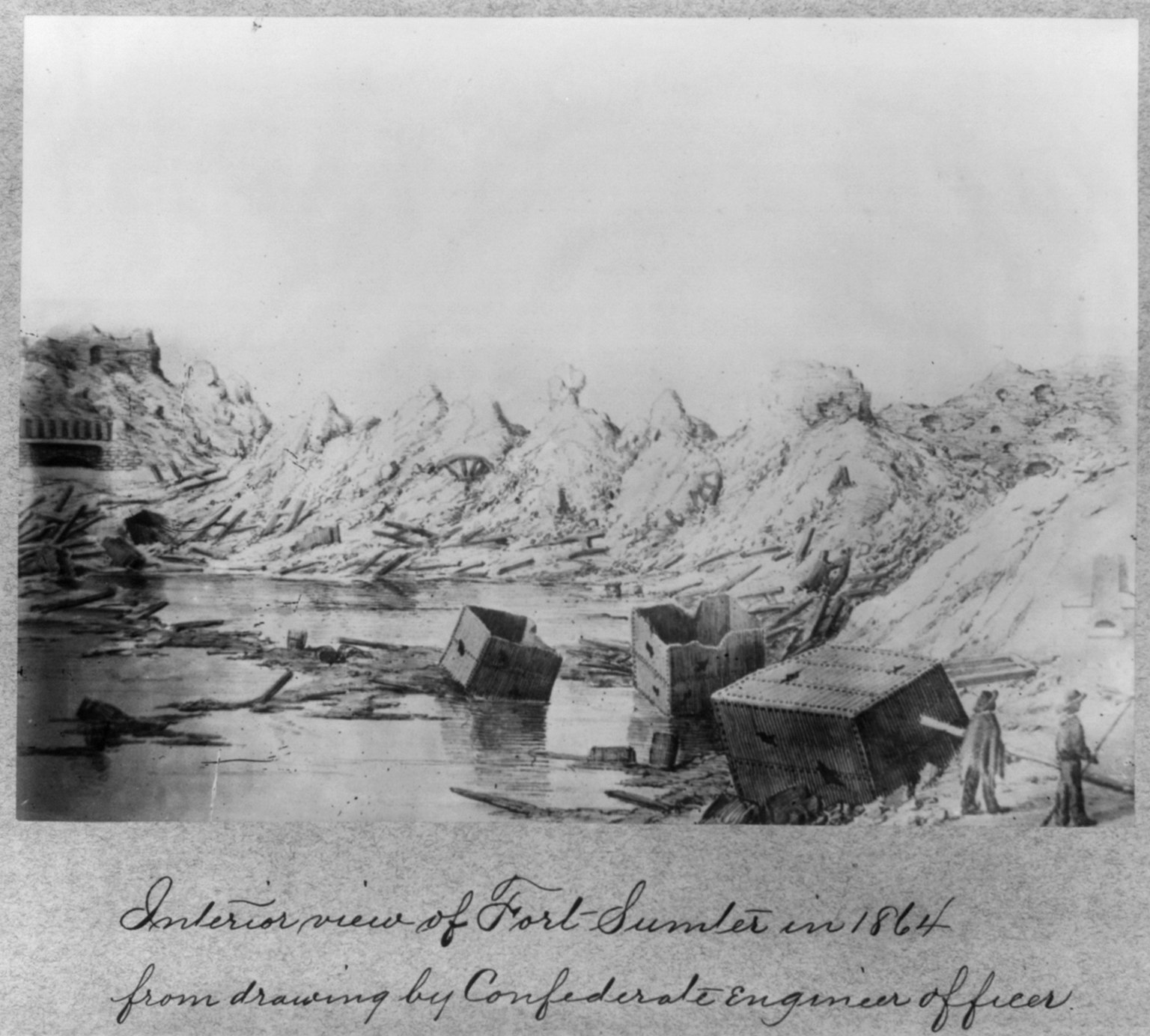
Interior View of Fort Sumter 1864

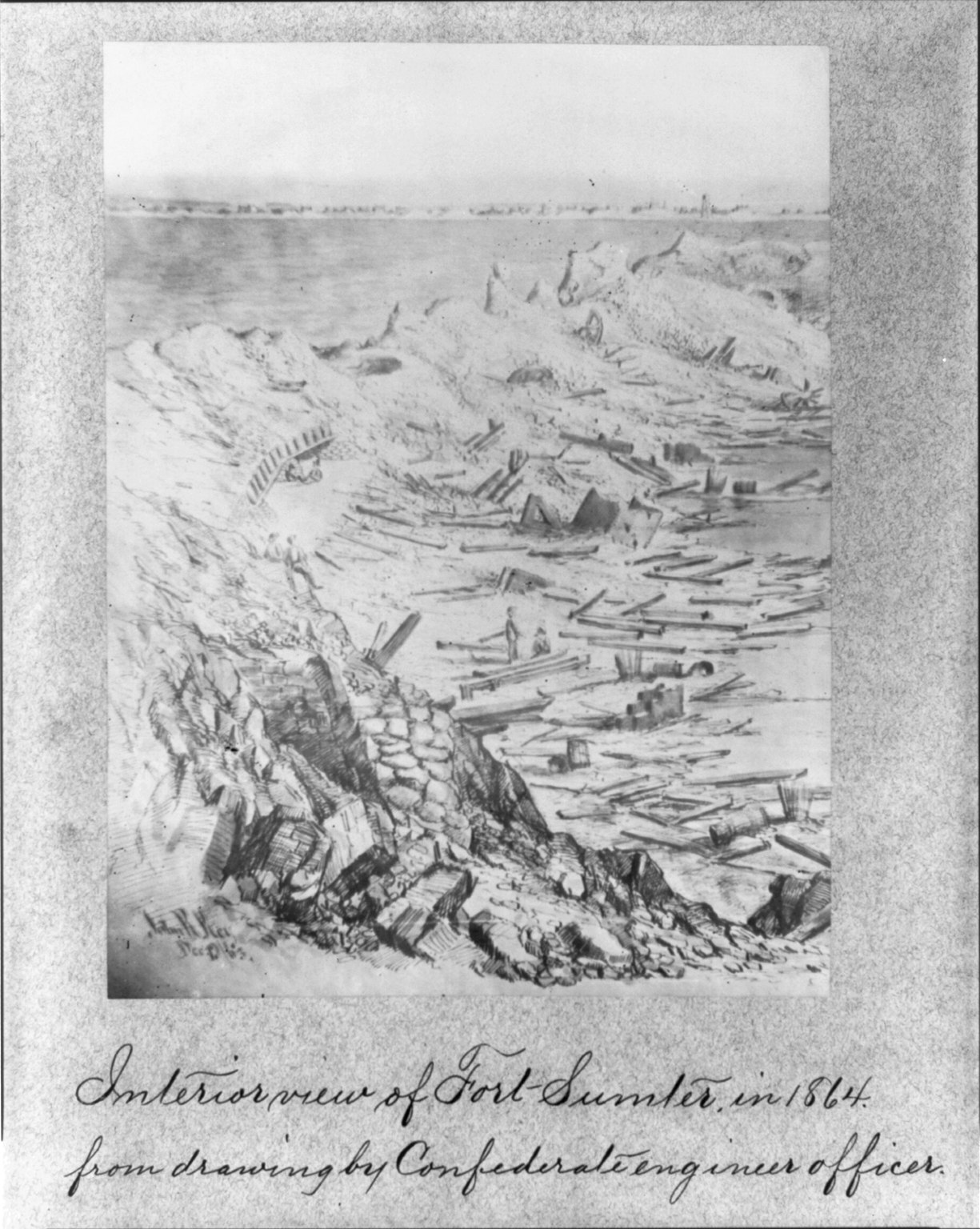
Interior View of Fort Sumter 1864

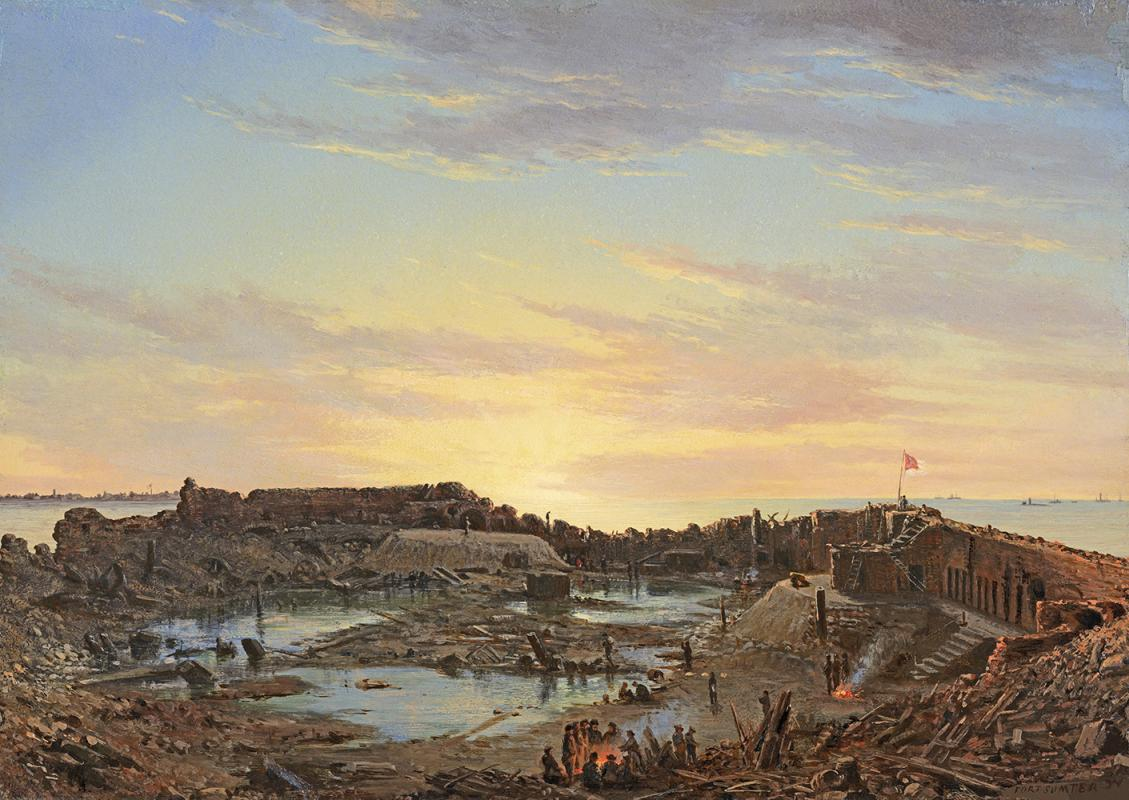
Interior View of Fort Sumter December 9, 1864

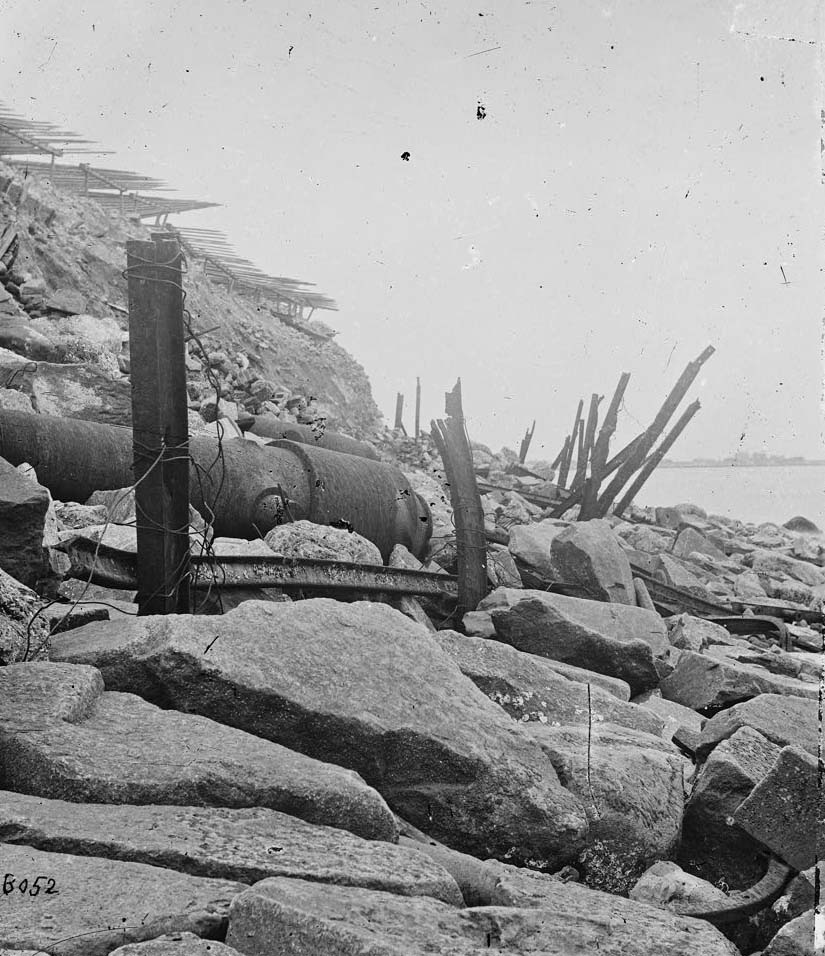
Exterior view of Fort Sumter, 1865. Banded rifle in the foreground, fraise at the top.

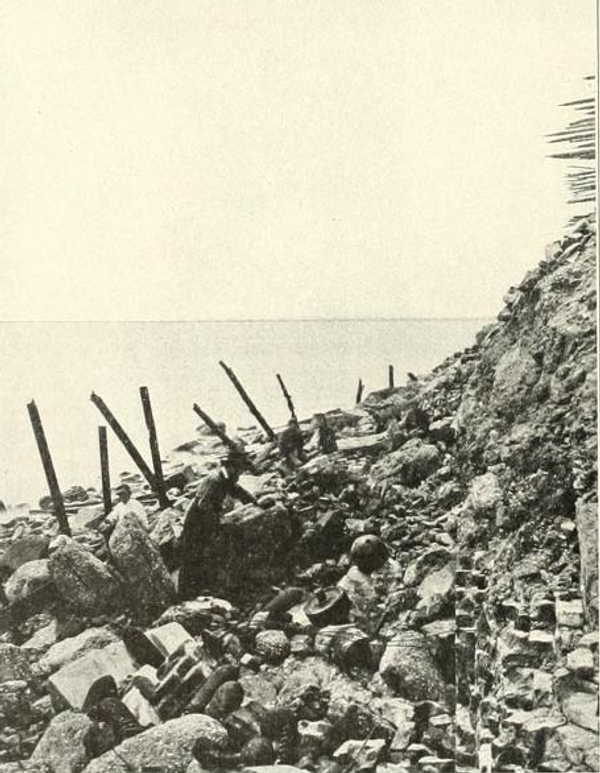
Exterior view of damage to Fort Sumter,

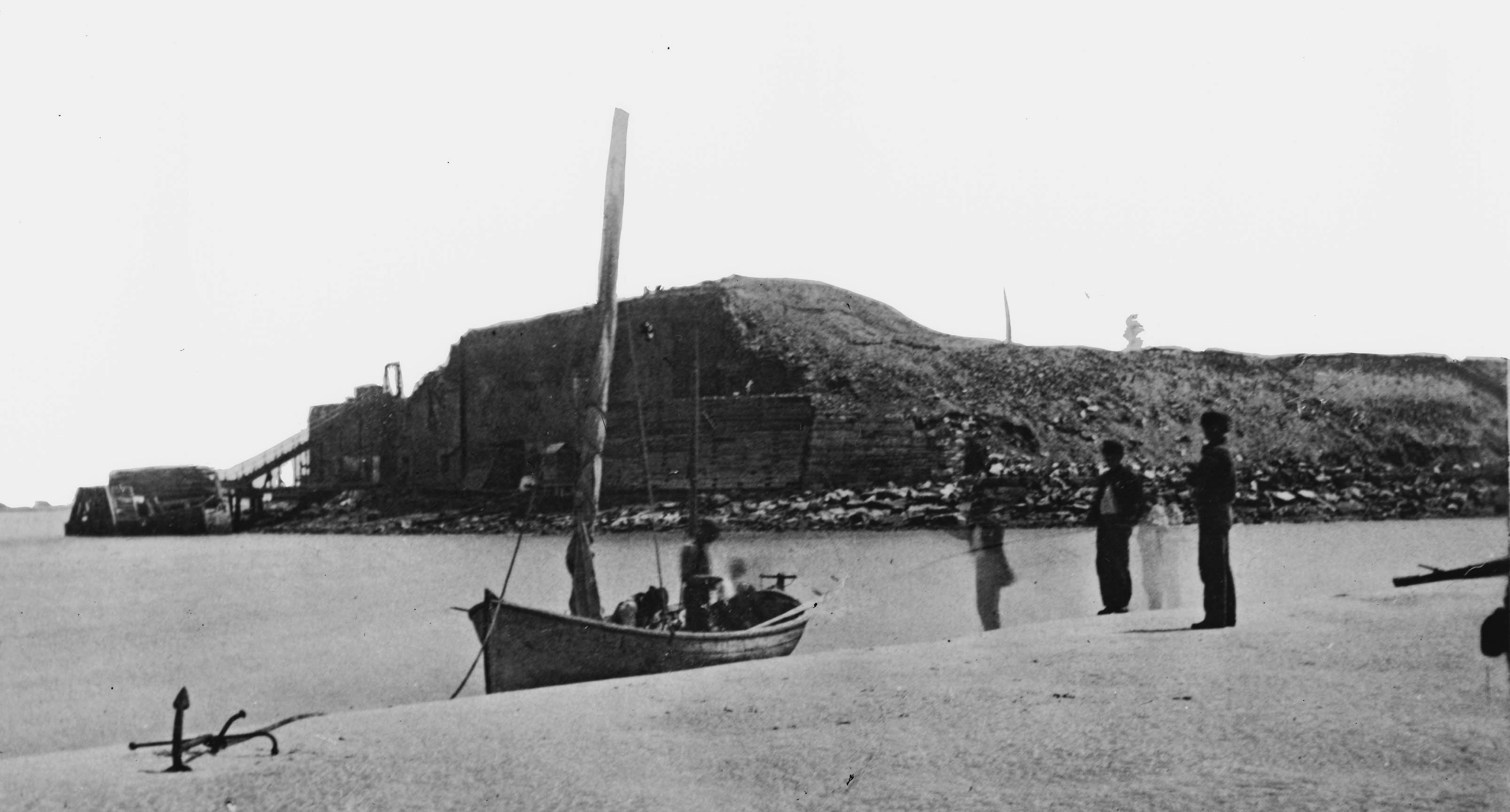
View of Fort Sumter from the sandbar, 1865.

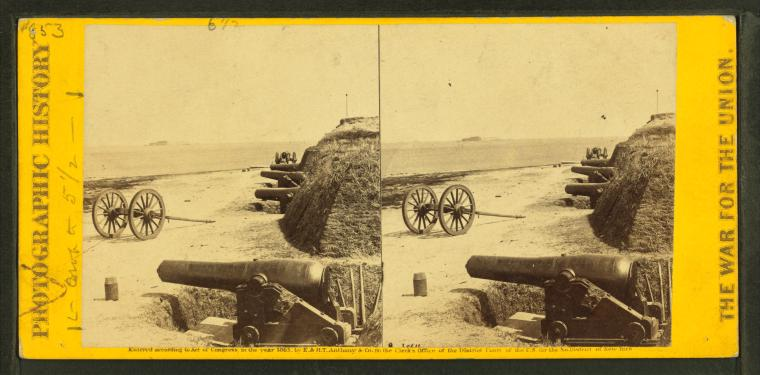
View of Battery Johnson with Ft Sumter in the background

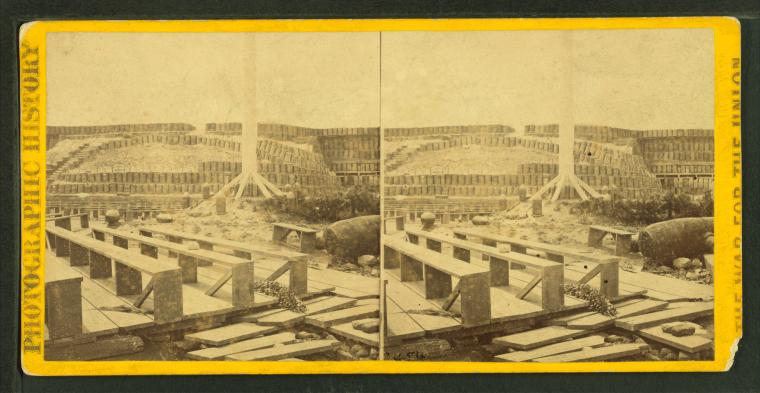
Interior of Ft Sumter

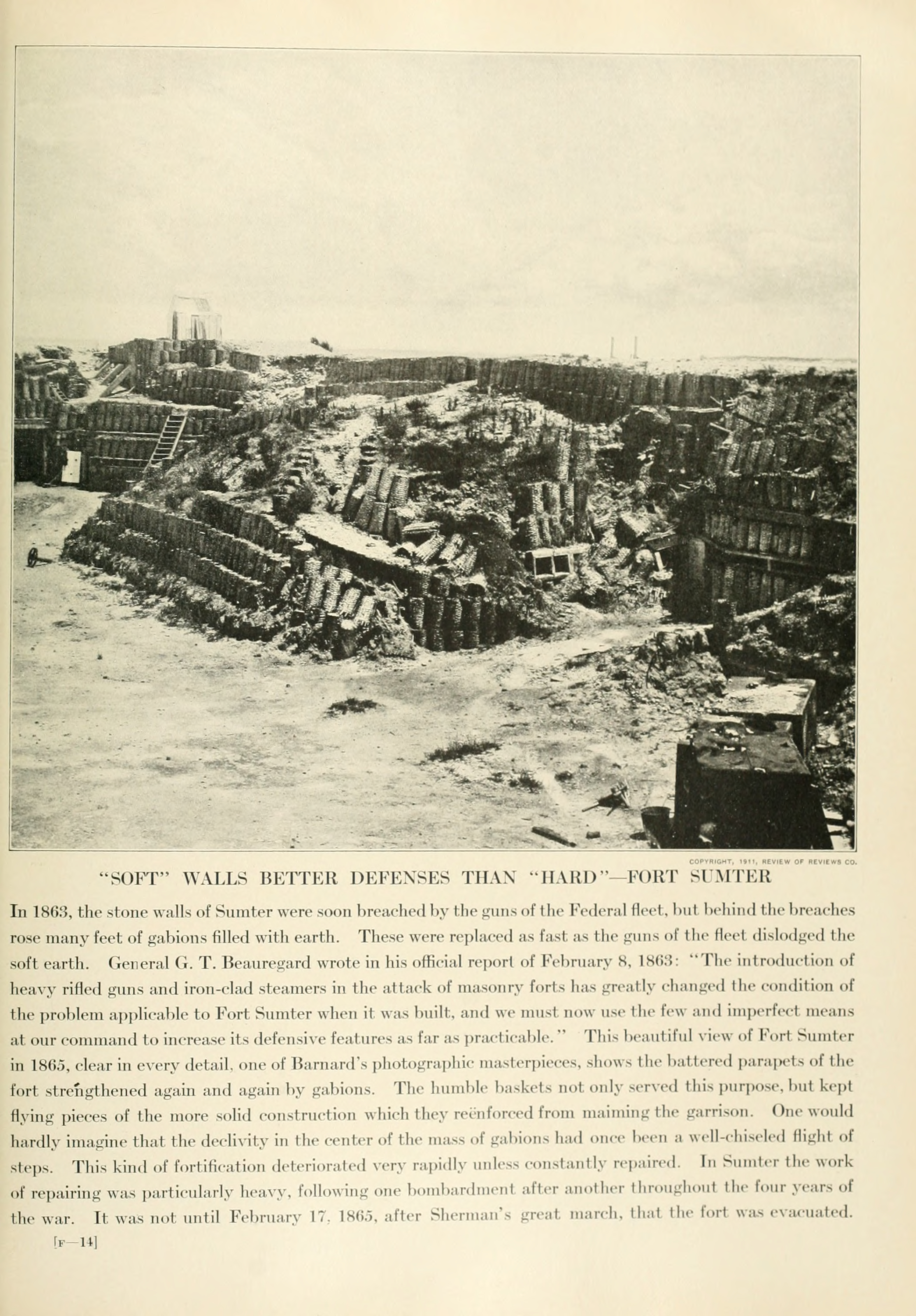
Interior of Ft Sumter 1865

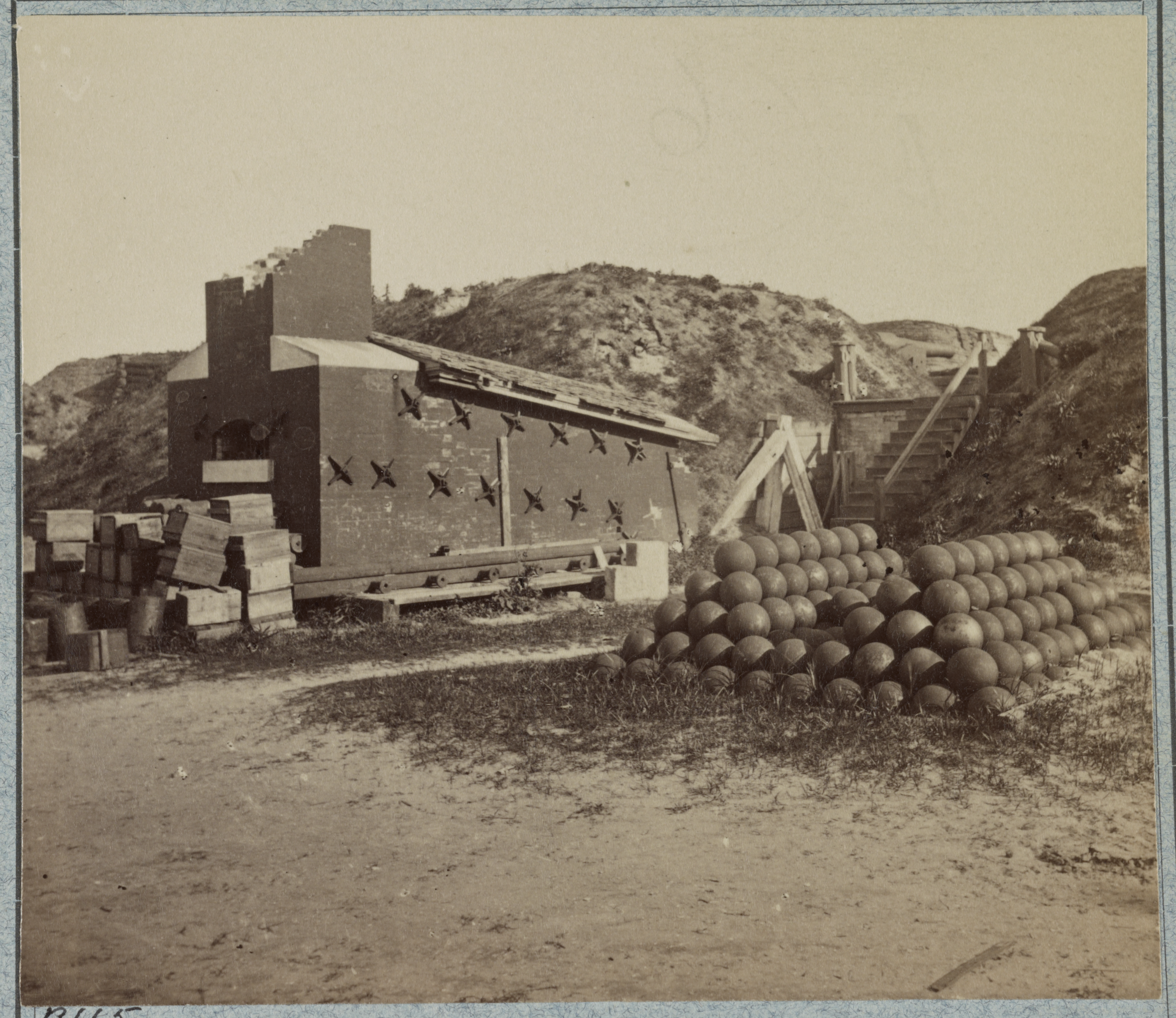
Interior of Ft Sumter 1865 showing the Hot Shot Furnace.

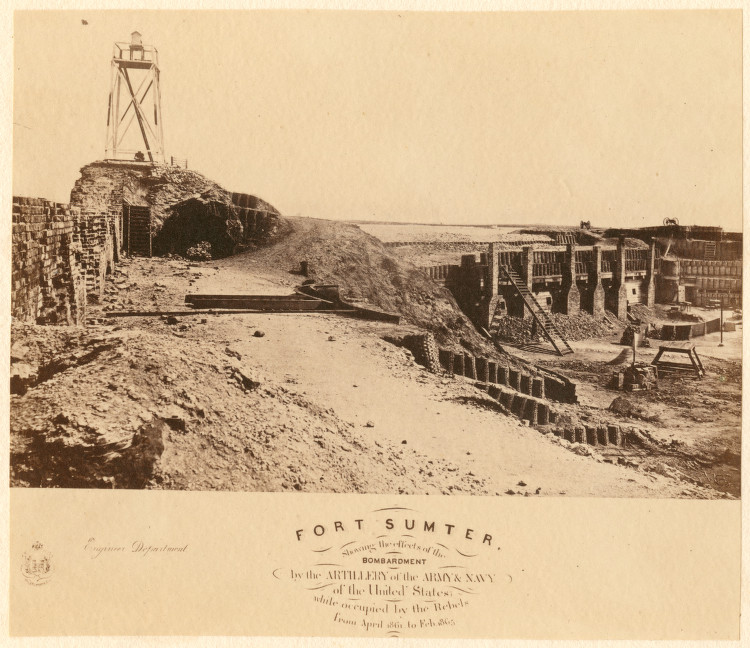
Interior view of Ft Sumter in 1865; at left is the "Light house" of Ft Sumter

After the devastating bombardment, both Major General Quincy A. Gillmore and Rear Admiral John A. Dahlgren, now commanding the South Atlantic Blockading Squadron, determined to launch a boat assault on Fort Sumter for the night of September 8–9, 1863. Cooperation between the Army and Navy was poor. Dahlgren refused to place his sailors and Marines under the command of an army officer, so two flotillas set out towards Fort Sumter that night. The army flotilla was detained off Morris Island by the low tide. By the time they could proceed, the navy assault had already been defeated and the army flotilla returned to shore.

The Navy's assault involved 400 sailors and Marines in 25 boats. The operation was a fiasco from beginning to end. Poor reconnaissance, planning, and communication all characterized the operation. Commander Thomas H. Stevens, Jr., commanding the monitor Patapsco, was placed in charge of the assault. When Commander Stevens protested that he "knew nothing of [the assault's] organization " and "made some remonstrances on this grounds and others." Dahlgren replied, "There is nothing but a corporal's guard [about 6–10 men] in the fort, and all we have to do is go and take possession." (Stevens 1902, p. 633). This underestimation of the Confederate forces on Dahlgren's part may explain why he was hostile to a joint operation wishing to reserve the credit for the victory to the navy. Less than half of the boats landed. Most of the boats that did land landed on the right flank or right gorge angle, rather than on the gorge where there was a passable breach. The Union sailors and Marines who did land could not scale the wall. The Confederates fired upon the landing party and as well as throwing hand grenades and loose bricks. The men in the boats that had not landed fired muskets and revolvers blindly at the fort, endangering the landing party more than the garrison. The landing party took shelter in shell holes in the wall of the fort. In response to a signal rocket fired by the garrison, Fort Johnson and the Confederate warship CSS Chicora opened fire upon the boats and landing party. A number of the boats withdrew under fire and the landing party surrendered. The Union casualties were 8 killed, 19 wounded, and 105 captured (including 15 of the wounded). The Confederates did not suffer any casualties in the assault.

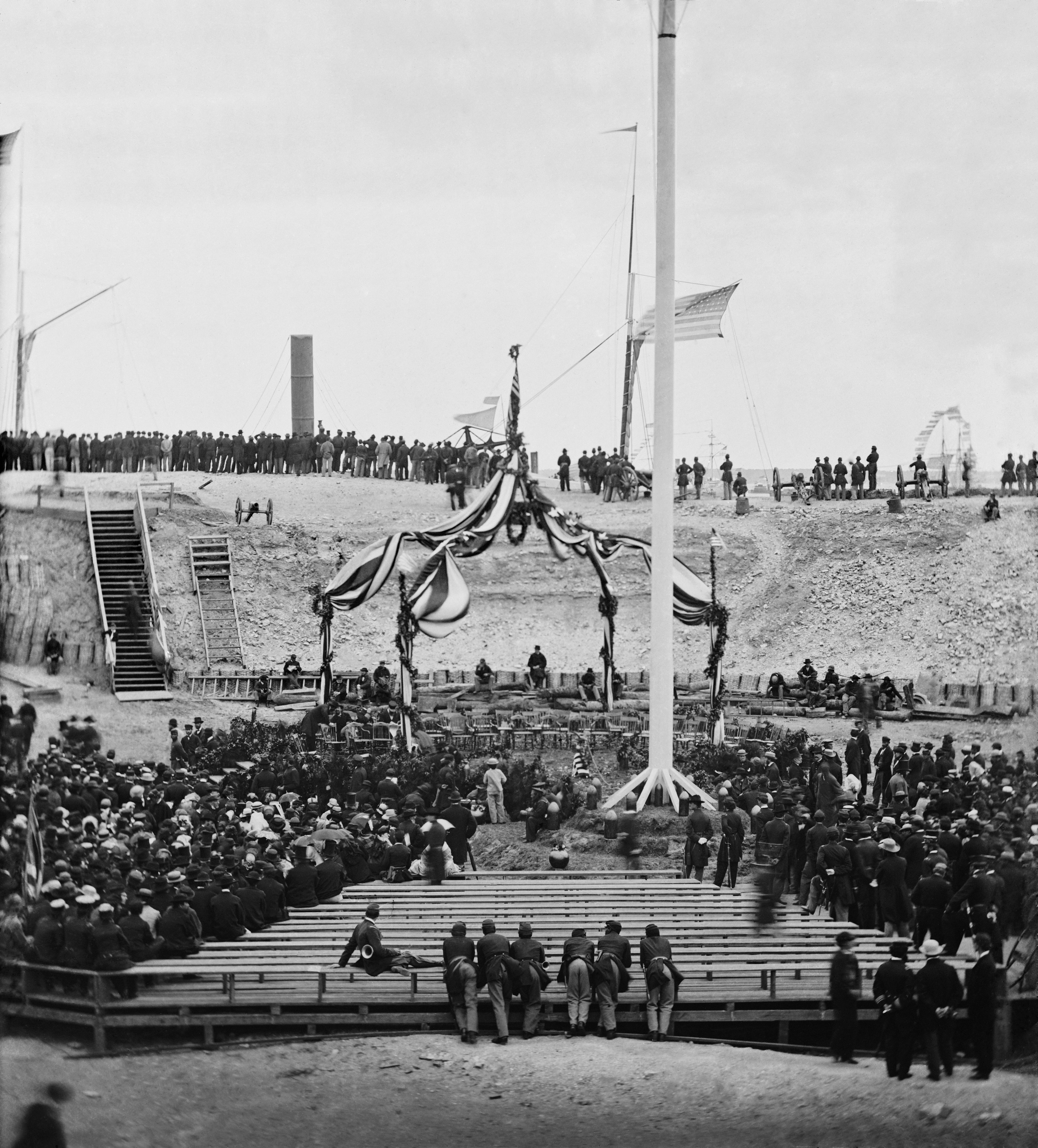
Flag-raising over Fort Sumter, April 14, 1865

After the unsuccessful boat assault, the bombardment recommenced and proceeded with the varying degree of intensity, doing more damage to Fort Sumter until the end of the war. The garrison continued to suffer casualties. The Confederates continued to salvage guns and other material from the ruins and harassed the Union batteries on Morris Island with sharpshooters. The Confederates mounted four 10-inch (250 mm) columbiads, one 8-inch (200 mm) columbiad rifled, and two rifled 42-pounders, in the left face, bottom tier casemates.

==== Recovery of Fort Sumter ====
The last Confederate commander, Major Thomas A. Huguenin, a graduate of The Citadel, never surrendered Fort Sumter, but General William Tecumseh Sherman's advance through South Carolina finally forced the Confederates to evacuate Charleston on February 17, 1865, and abandon Fort Sumter. The Federal government formally took possession of Fort Sumter on February 22, 1865.

Anderson, now a major general, returned to Sumter with the flag he had been forced to lower four years earlier, and on April 14, 1865, raised it in triumph over the ruined fort. Henry Ward Beecher was present and subsequently spoke at length about the occasion.

=== After the war ===
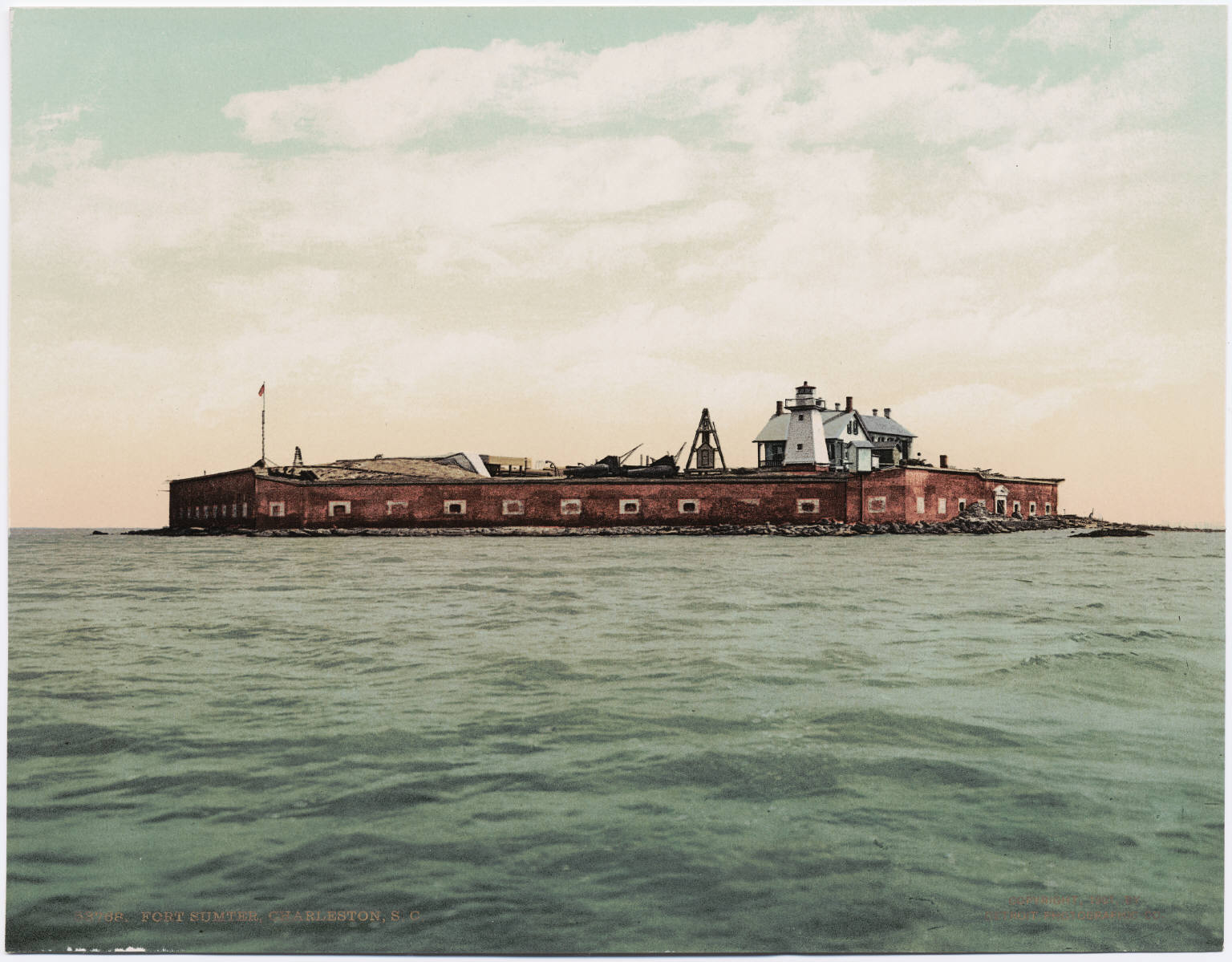
Fort Sumter, ca. 1900

When the Civil War ended, Fort Sumter was in ruins. The U.S. Army worked to restore it as a useful military installation. The damaged walls were re-leveled to a lower height and partially rebuilt. The third tier of gun emplacements was removed. Eleven of the original first-tier gun rooms were restored with 100-pounder Parrott rifles.

From 1876 to 1897, Fort Sumter was used only as an unmanned lighthouse station. The start of the Spanish–American War prompted renewed interest in its military use and reconstruction commenced on the facilities that had further deteriorated over time. A new massive concrete blockhouse-style installation was built in 1898 inside the original walls, armed with two 12-inch M1888 guns, one on a disappearing carriage. Named "Battery Huger" in honor of Revolutionary War General Isaac Huger, it never saw combat. This battery was deactivated in 1947, and in 1948 the fort became Fort Sumter National Monument under the control of the National Park Service.

One hundred and forty-seven years after it was sent, a rolled up telegraphic message was found in a trunk belonging to Col. Alexander Ramsay Thompson of New York and eventually given to a museum in Charleston, S.C. The telegram was dated April 14, 1861 from the Governor of South Carolina to Gazaway Bugg Lamar in New York, reading in part:

Fort Sumter surrendered yesterday after we had set all on fire... F.W. Pickens

In 1966, the site was listed on the National Register of Historic Places. The Civil War Trust (a division of the American Battlefield Trust) and its partners have acquired and preserved 0.23 acres (0.00093 km^{2}) of historic land related to the battles at Fort Sumter.

== Fort Sumter and Fort Moultrie National Historical Park ==
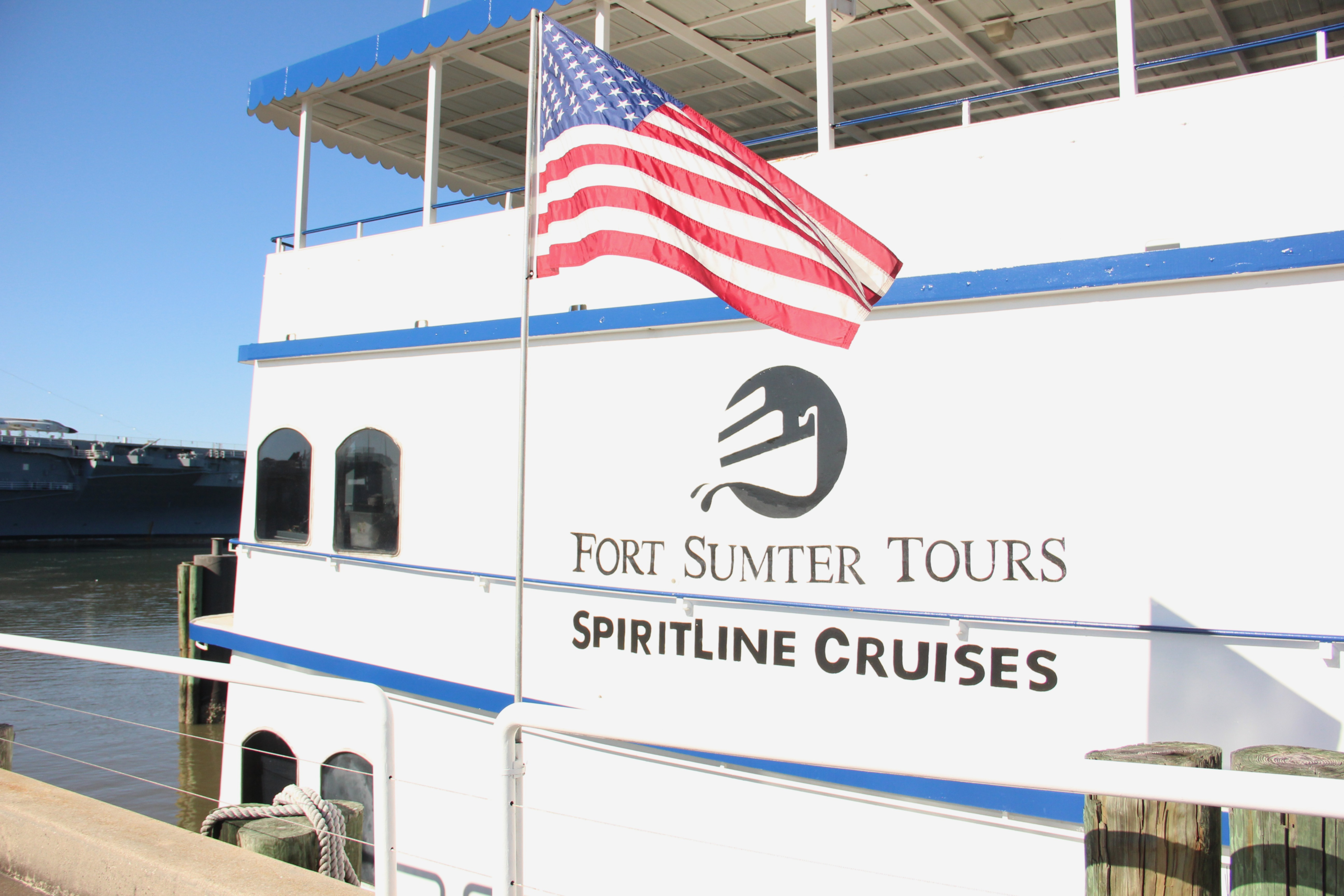
Fort Sumter ferry

Fort Sumter and Fort Moultrie National Historical Park encompasses three sites in Charleston: the original Fort Sumter, the Fort Sumter Visitor Education Center, and Fort Moultrie on Sullivan's Island. Access to Fort Sumter itself is by a 30-minute ferry ride from the Fort Sumter Visitor Education Center or Patriots Point. Access by private boat is no longer allowed.

The Visitor Education Center's museum features exhibits about the disagreements between the North and South that led to the incidents at Fort Sumter. The museum at Fort Sumter focuses on the activities at the fort, including its construction and role during the Civil War.

April 12, 2011, marked the 150th Anniversary of the start of the Civil War. There was a commemoration of the events by thousands of Civil War reenactors with encampments in the area. A United States stamp of Fort Sumter and a first-day cover were issued that day.

On June 28, 2015, in the aftermath of the events of June 17, 2015, when a mass shooting took place at Emanuel African Methodist Episcopal Church in downtown Charleston, South Carolina, the five small flags that were arranged in a semi-circle around the large flagpole flying the 50-star United States flag at Fort Sumter were lowered so that the South Carolina flag could be flown at half staff. Those flown include a 33-star United States flag, a Confederate First National Flag (Stars and Bars), a South Carolina State Flag, a Confederate Second National Flag (Stainless Banner), and a 35-star United States flag. This display was added to Fort Sumter National Monument in the 1970s. In August 2015, the flagpoles were removed to create a new exhibit. The four historic national flags now fly on the lower parade ground.

By December 2019, sea level rise led to a Park Service decision to move some of the large rocks "originally installed to protect the fort from the sea," farther from the fort's walls, in order to create a protective breakwater and wetland.

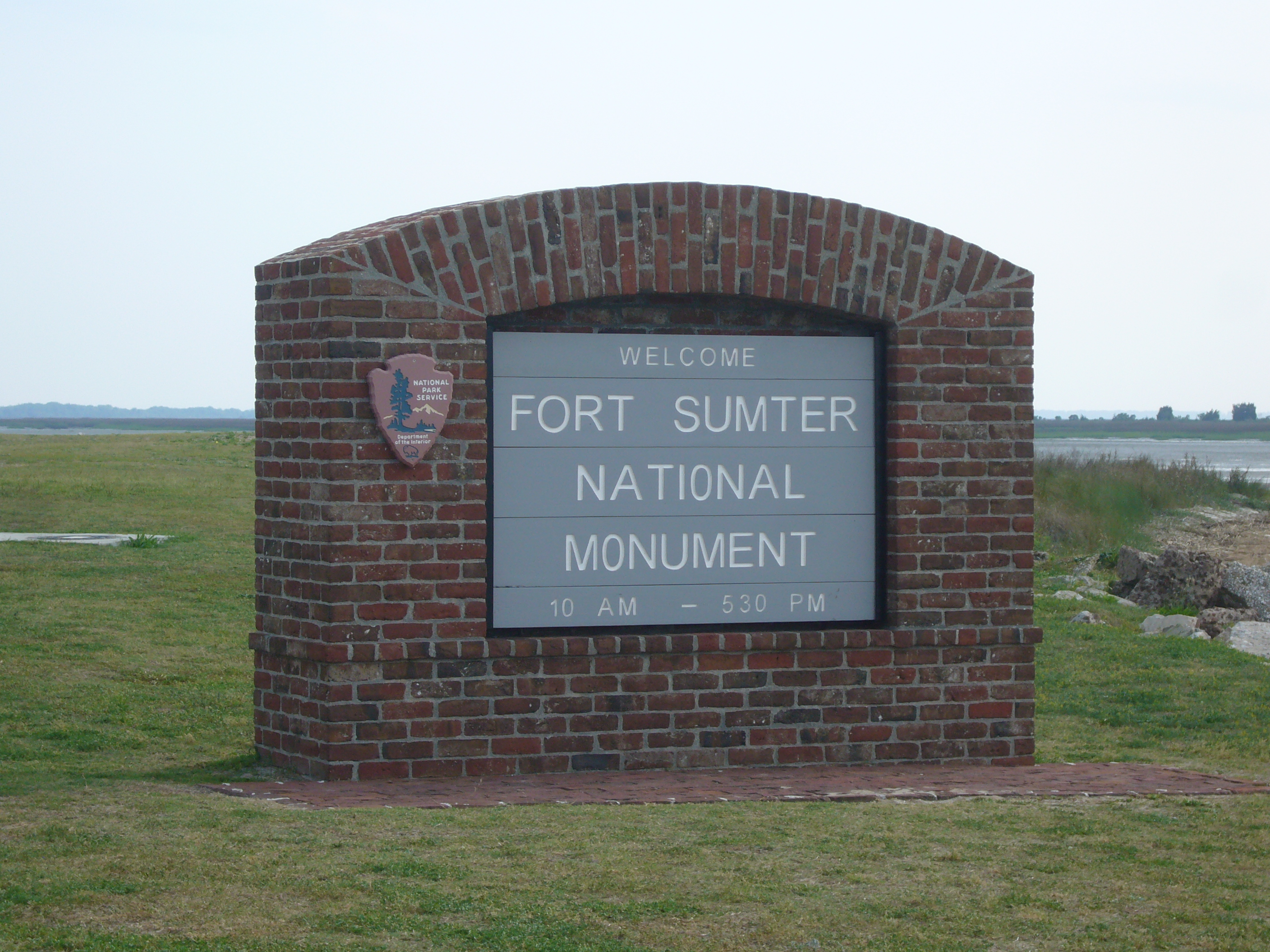
Fort Sumter National Monument

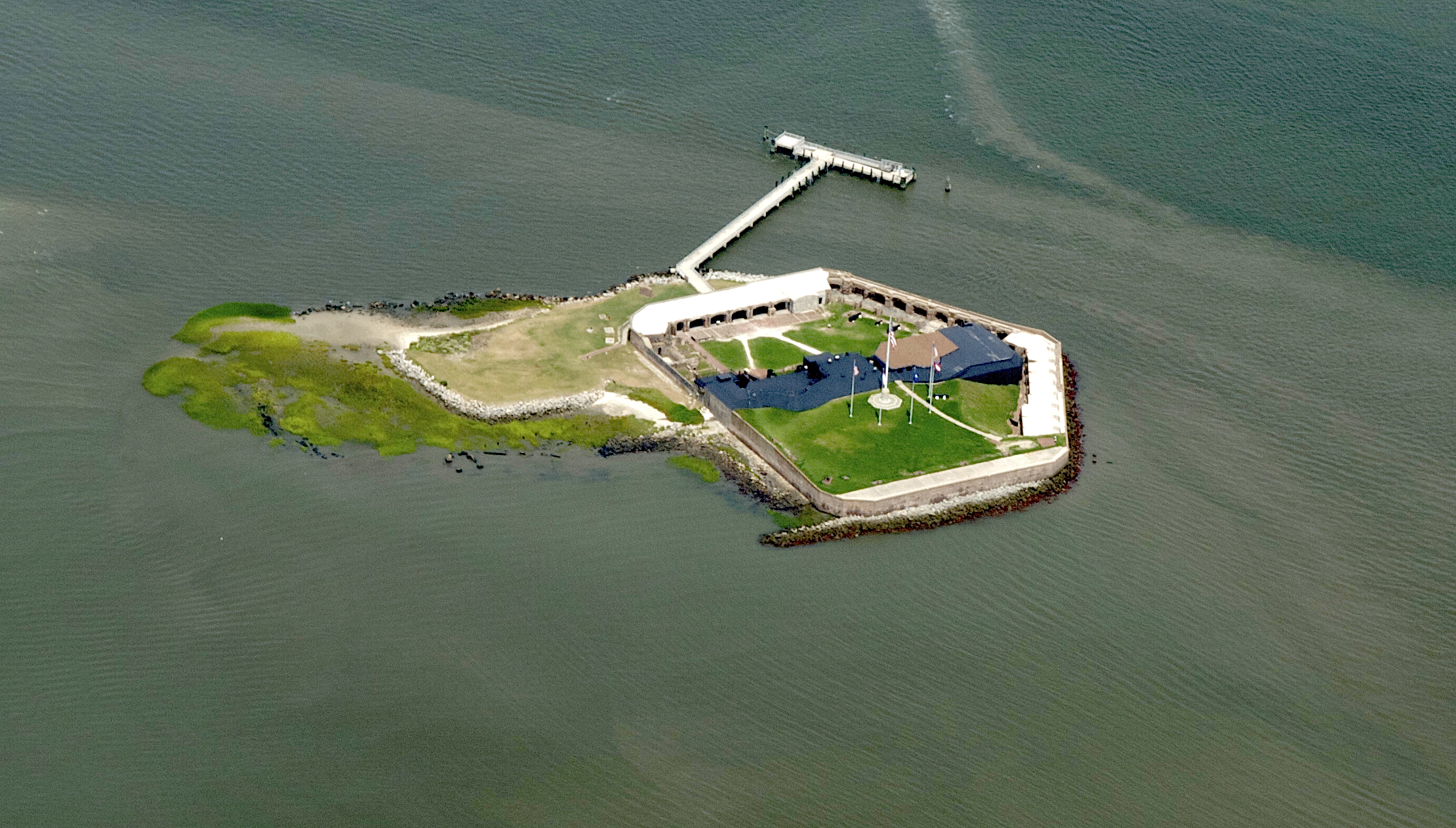
Aerial view of Fort Sumter National Monument

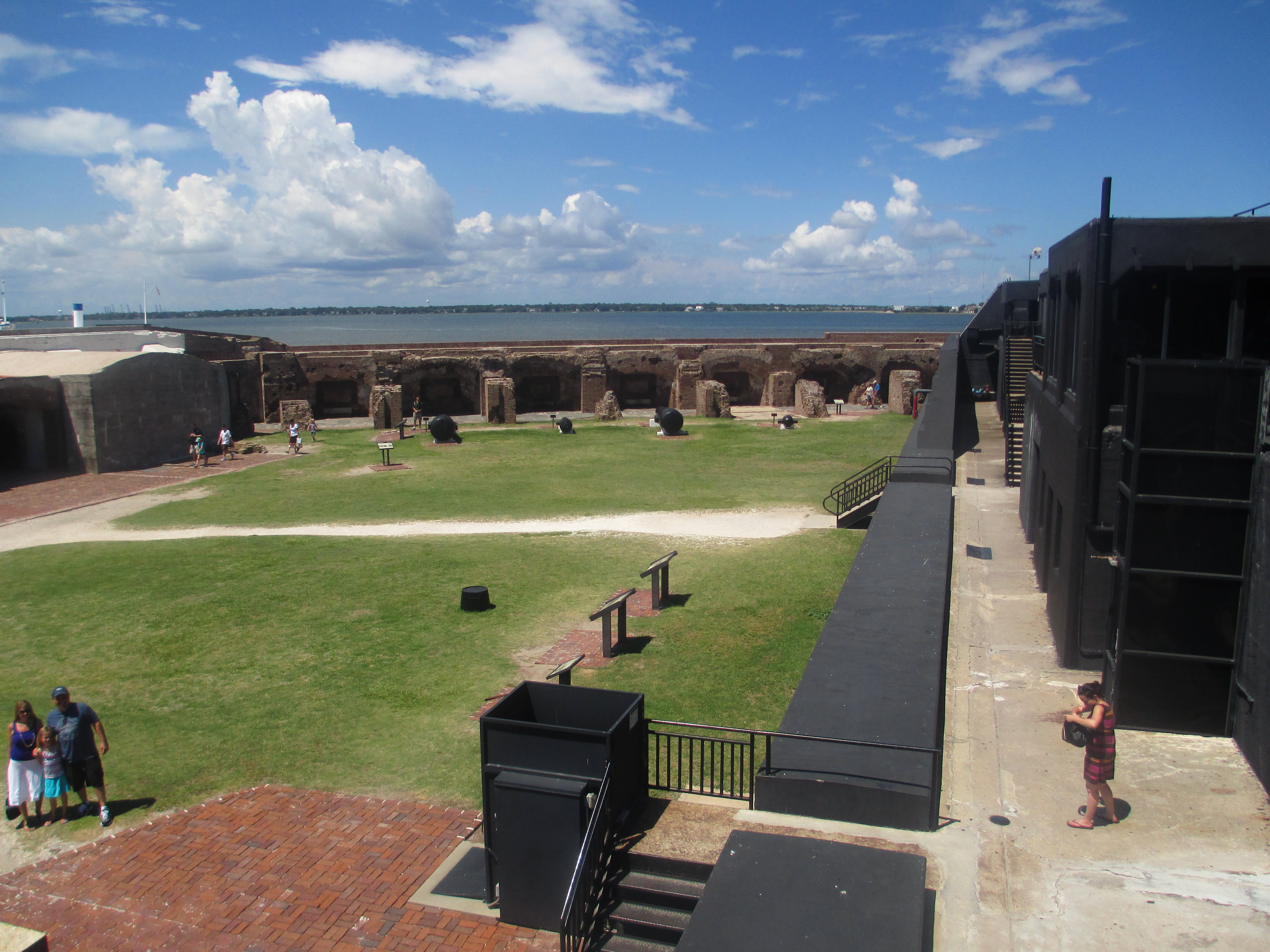
The interior of Fort Sumter from the top of the fort

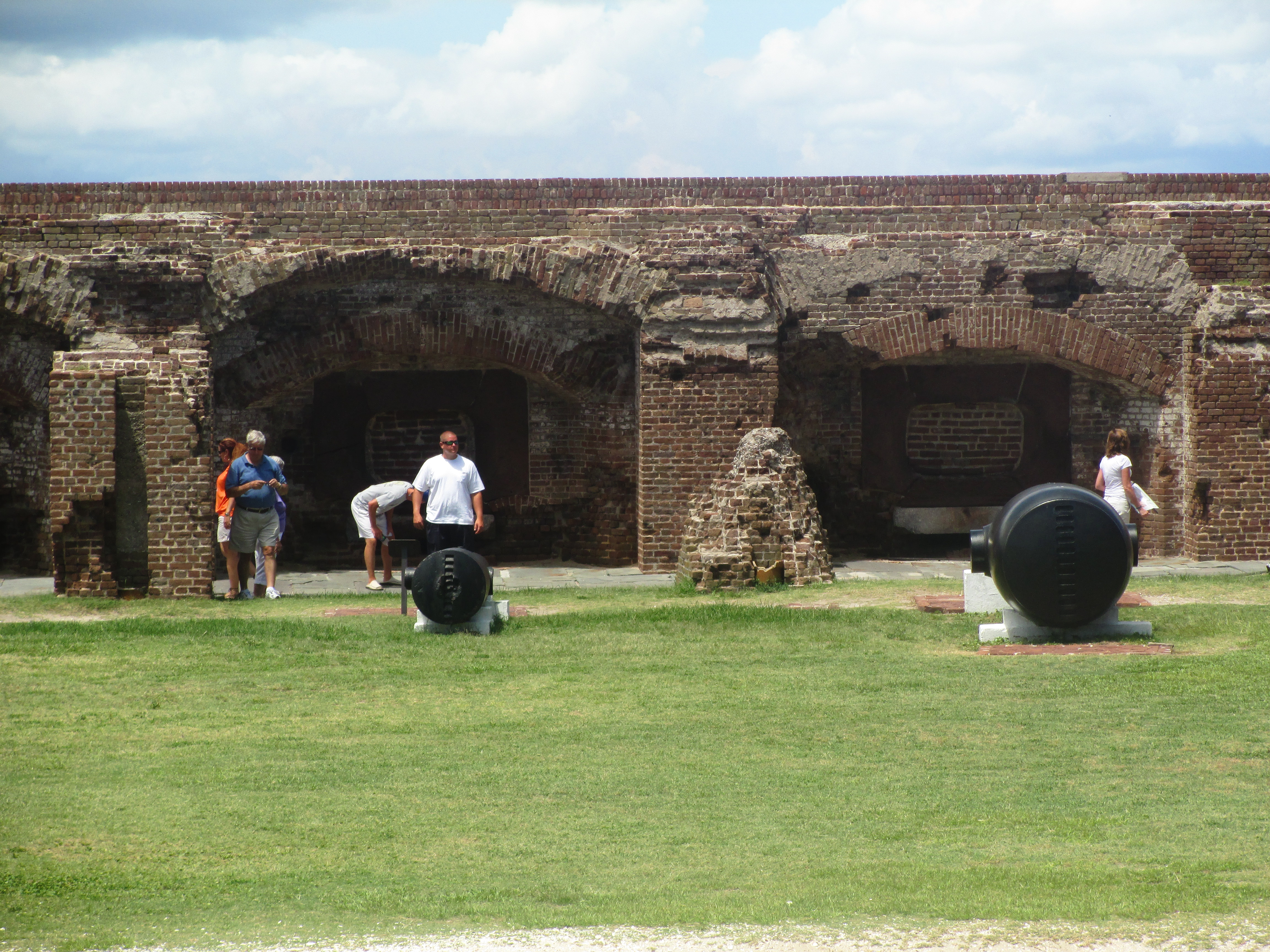
Tourists at Fort Sumter on a summer afternoon

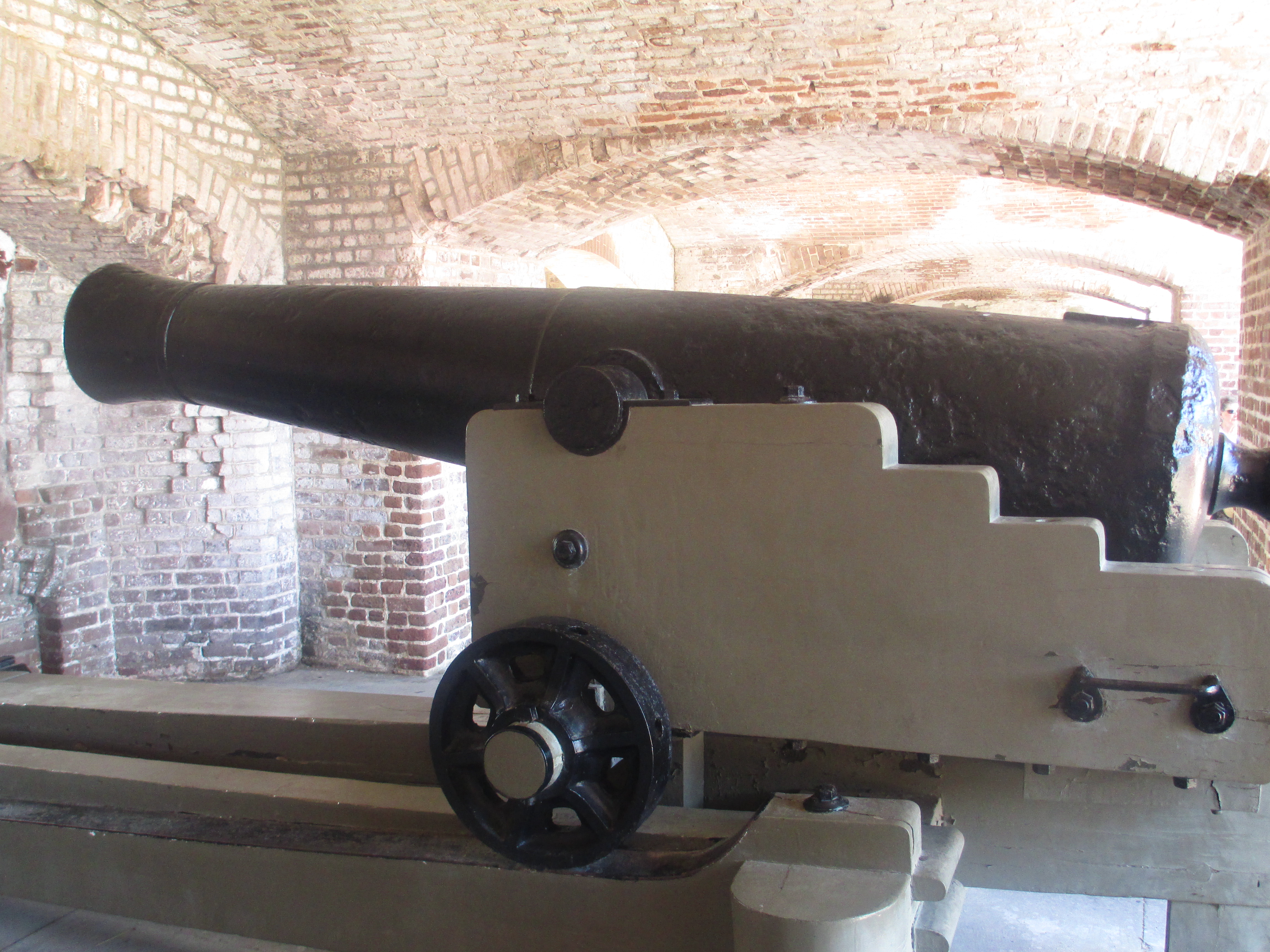
Cannon displayed at Fort Sumter

== See also ==
- Castle Pinckney
- Fort Sumter Flag
