= Second Battle of Charleston Harbor order of battle: Union =

The following Union Army units and commanders fought in the Siege of Charleston Harbor of the American Civil War. The Confederate order of battle is listed separately.

The following lists contain the commanders and units involved in the operations against Charleston Harbor from July to September 1863 which included the major engagements of First Fort Wagner, Grimball's Landing, Second Fort Wagner and the Siege of Charleston Harbor.

== Abbreviations used ==
=== Military ranks ===
- MG = Major general
- BG = Brigadier general
- Col = Colonel
- Ltc = Lieutenant colonel
- Maj = Major
- Cpt = Captain
- Lt = 1st lieutenant

=== Other ===
- w = wounded
- mw = mortally wounded
- k = killed

== Initial Operations (July 6–18, 1863) ==
=== X Corps (Department of the South) ===
BG Quincy A. Gillmore

Division	Brigade	Regiments and Others
First Division; BG Alfred H. Terry (Engaged at James Island)	1st Brigade BG Thomas G. Stevenson	4th New Hampshire; 10th Connecticut; 24th Massachusetts; 97th Pennsylvania
First Division; BG Alfred H. Terry (Engaged at James Island)	2nd Brigade Col William Watts Hart Davis	52nd Pennsylvania; 104th Pennsylvania; 56th New York; 100th New York
First Division; BG Alfred H. Terry (Engaged at James Island)	3rd Brigade Col James Montgomery	2nd South Carolina; 54th Massachusetts
2nd Division; BG Truman Seymour (Engaged at First Fort Wagner)	1st Brigade BG Israel Vogdes	39th Illinois; 62nd Ohio; 67th Ohio; 7th New Hampshire; 85th Pennsylvania; Independent New York Battalion
2nd Division; BG Truman Seymour (Engaged at First Fort Wagner)	2nd Brigade BG George C. Strong	3rd New Hampshire; 7th Connecticut; 9th Maine; 76th Pennsylvania

=== Fort Wagner (July 18, 1863) ===
Division	Brigade	Regiments and Others
Attacking Column; BG Truman Seymour (w)	Strong's Brigade BG George C. Strong (mw)	3rd New Hampshire; 6th Connecticut: Col John Lyman Chatfield (mw); 9th Maine; 48th New York: Col William B. Barton (w); 54th Massachusetts: Col Robert G. Shaw (k); 76th Pennsylvania
Attacking Column; BG Truman Seymour (w)	Putnam's Brigade Col Haldimand S. Putnam (k)	7th New Hampshire; 62nd Ohio; 67th Ohio; 100th New York
Attacking Column; BG Truman Seymour (w)	Stevenson's Brigade BG Thomas G. Stevenson	2nd South Carolina; 10th Connecticut; 24th Massachusetts; 97th Pennsylvania

== Siege Operations (July 18-September 7, 1863) ==
=== X Corps, Department of the South (July–August) ===
BG Quincy A. Gillmore

- Chief of Staff and Artillery: Col John Wesley Turner
- Engineers: Col Edward W. Serrell
- Medical Director: Ltc Augustus C. Hamlin

Division	Brigade	Regiments and Others
Morris Island; BG Alfred H. Terry	1st Brigade BG Israel Vogdes until 1 Aug; Col Henry R. Guss	3rd New Hampshire: Cpt James F. Randlett; 4th New Hampshire: Col Louis Bell; 7th Connecticut (detachment): Cpt Sylvester Gray; 9th Maine: Ltc Zina H. Robinson; 76th Pennsylvania: Cpt John S. Littell
Morris Island; BG Alfred H. Terry	2nd Brigade Col Joshua B. Howell	2nd South Carolina: Col James Montgomery; 39th Illinois: Col Thomas O. Osborn; 62nd Ohio: Col Francis Bates Pond; 67th Ohio: Maj Lewis Butler; 85th Pennsylvania: Ltc Henry A. Purviance
Morris Island; BG Alfred H. Terry	3rd Brigade BG Thomas G. Stevenson	7th New Hampshire: Ltc Joseph C. Abbott; 10th Connecticut: Maj Edwin S. Greeley; 24th Massachusetts: Col Francis A. Osborn; 54th Massachusetts: Col Milton S. Littlefield; 97th Pennsylvania: Col Henry R. Guss; 100th New York: Col George B. Dandy
Morris Island; BG Alfred H. Terry	Artillery Maj James E. Bailey	3rd Rhode Island Heavy Artillery, Battery A; 3rd Rhode Island Heavy Artillery, Battery B; 3rd Rhode Island Heavy Artillery, Battery C; 3rd Rhode Island Heavy Artillery, Battery D; 3rd Rhode Island Heavy Artillery, Battery H; 3rd Rhode Island Heavy Artillery, Battery I; 3rd Rhode Island Heavy Artillery, Battery M; 3rd New York Artillery, Battery B: Lt Edward A. Wildt; 3rd New York Artillery, Battery F: Lt Paul Birchmeyer; 1st U.S. Artillery, Battery B: Lt Guy V. Henry; 1st U.S. Artillery, Battery C: Lt James E. Wilson; 3rd U.S. Artillery, Battery E: Lt John R. Myrick; 48th New York Infantry (detachment serving as artillery): Maj Dudley Strickland; 11th Maine Infantry (detachment serving as artillery): Lt Charles Sellmer
Morris Island; BG Alfred H. Terry	Cavalry	1st Massachusetts Cavalry, Company I: Lt Charles V. Holt
Morris Island; BG Alfred H. Terry	Engineers	1st New York Engineers: Col Edward W. Serrell, Maj Thomas B. Brooks
Morris Island; BG Alfred H. Terry	Marines	Marine Battalion: Maj Jacob Zeilin
Folly Island; Col William W.H. Davis	Davis' Brigade Col William W.H. Davis	52nd Pennsylvania: Col John C. Dodge; 56th New York: Col Charles Van Wyck; 104th Pennsylvania: Ltc Thompson D. Hart
Folly Island; Col William W.H. Davis	Not brigaded	47th New York: Ltc Albert B. Nicholson; Independent New York Battalion: Ltc Simon Levy
Folly Island; Col William W.H. Davis	Artillery	1st Connecticut Battery: Cpt Alfred P. Rockwell; 3rd New York Artillery, Battery B: Cpt James Ashcroft

=== X Corps, Department of the South (August–September) ===
MG Quincy A. Gillmore

- Chief of Staff and Artillery: Col John Wesley Turner
- Engineers: Col Edward W. Serrell
- Medical Director: Ltc Augustus C. Hamlin

Division	Brigade	Regiments and Others
Morris Island; BG Alfred H. Terry	1st Brigade Col Henry R. Guss	3rd New Hampshire: Cpt James F. Randlett; 4th New Hampshire: Col Louis Bell; 9th Maine: Ltc Zina H. Robinson; 97th Pennsylvania: Maj Galusha Pennypacker
Morris Island; BG Alfred H. Terry	2nd Brigade Col Joshua B. Howell	39th Illinois: Col Thomas O. Osborn; 62nd Ohio: Col Francis Bates Pond; 67th Ohio: Maj Lewis Butler; 85th Pennsylvania: Maj Edward Campbell
Morris Island; BG Alfred H. Terry	3rd Brigade BG Thomas G. Stevenson	7th New Hampshire: Ltc Joseph C. Abbott; 7th Connecticut: Col Joseph R. Hawley; 10th Connecticut: Maj Edwin S. Greeley; 24th Massachusetts: Col Francis A. Osborn; 100th New York: Col George B. Dandy
Morris Island; BG Alfred H. Terry	4th Brigade Col James Montgomery	2nd South Carolina; 3rd U.S.C.T.: Col Benjamin C. Tilghman; 54th Massachusetts: Col Milton S. Littlefield
Morris Island; BG Alfred H. Terry	5th Brigade Col William W.H. Davis	47th New York: Maj Christopher R. MacDonald; 52nd Pennsylvania: Ltc Henry M. Hoyt; 104th Pennsylvania: Maj Edward L. Rodgers; Independent New York Battalion: Cpt Michael Schmitt
Morris Island; BG Alfred H. Terry	Artillery	3rd New York Artillery, Battery B: Cpt James E. Ashcroft; 3rd New York Artillery, Battery F: Lt Paul Birchmeyer; 3rd Rhode Island Heavy Artillery, Battery B: Cpt Albert E. Greene; 3rd Rhode Island Heavy Artillery, Battery C: Cpt Charles R. Brayton; 3rd Rhode Island Heavy Artillery, Battery D: Cpt Richard G. Shaw; 3rd Rhode Island Heavy Artillery, Battery H: Cpt Augustus Colwell; 3rd Rhode Island Heavy Artillery, Battery I: Cpt Charles G. Strahan; 3rd Rhode Island Heavy Artillery, Battery M: Cpt Joseph J. Comstock; 1st U.S. Artillery, Battery B: Lt Guy V. Henry; 1st U.S. Artillery, Battery C (detachment): Lt James W. Wilson; 3rd U.S. Artillery, Battery E: Lt John R. Myrick; 11th Maine Infantry (detachment serving as artillery): Lt Charles Sellmer
Morris Island; BG Alfred H. Terry	Unassigned	Marine Battalion: Cpt Edward M. Reynolds; 1st Massachusetts Cavalry, Company I: Lt Charles V. Holt
Morris Island; BG Alfred H. Terry	Engineers	1st New York Engineers: Col Edward W. Serrell
North End of Folly Island; BG Israel Vogdes	1st Brigade BG Robert S. Foster	13th Indiana: Col Cyrus J. Dobbs; 112th New York: Col Jeremiah C. Drake; 169th New York: Col Clarence Buell
North End of Folly Island; BG Israel Vogdes	2nd Brigade Col Samuel M. Alford	3rd New York: Ltc Eldridge G. Floyd; 89th New York: Col Harrison S. Fairchild; 103rd New York: Col Wilhelm Heine; 117th New York: Col Alvin White
North End of Folly Island; BG Israel Vogdes	3rd "African" Brigade BG Edward A. Wild	1st North Carolina: Col James C. Beecher; 2nd North Carolina (detachment): Col Alonzo G. Draper; 3rd North Carolina (one company): Cpt John Wilder; 55th Massachusetts: Col Norwood P. Hallowell
North End of Folly Island; BG Israel Vogdes	Artillery	1st Connecticut Battery: Cpt Alfred P. Rockwell
South End of Folly Island; BG George H. Gordon	1st Brigade BG Alexander Schimmelfennig	41st New York: Ltc Detlev von Einsiedel; 54th New York: Cpt Clemens Knipschild; 127th New York: Col Stewart L. Woodford; 142nd New York: Col Newton M. Curtis; 74th Pennsylvania: Cpt Henry Krauseneck; 107th Ohio: Cpt William Smith
South End of Folly Island; BG George H. Gordon	2nd Brigade BG Adelbert Ames	17th Connecticut: Col William H. Noble; 25th Ohio: Cpt Nathaniel Haughton; 75th Ohio: Col Andrew L. Harris; 40th Massachusetts: Ltc Joseph A. Dalton; 144th New York: Col David E. Gregory; 157th New York: Maj James C. Carmichael

== Naval Blockade ==
=== South Atlantic Blockading Squadron ===
Rear Admiral John A. Dahlgren

Class	Vessel
Ironclads	U.S.S. Montauk
Ironclads	U.S.S. Nahant
Ironclads	U.S.S. Catskill
Ironclads	U.S.S. Passaic
Ironclads	U.S.S. Patapsco
Ironclads	U.S.S. New Ironsides: Cdre Thomas Turner, Capt Stephen C. Rowan
Gunboats	U.S.S. Canandaigua
Gunboats	U.S.S. Mahaska
Gunboats	U.S.S. Ottawa
Gunboats	U.S.S. Wissahickon
Gunboats	U.S.S. Dai Ching
Gunboats	U.S.S. Lodona
Gunboats	U.S.S. Seneca
U.S. Marines	Marine Battalion: Maj Jacob Zeilen

== See also ==
- South Carolina in the American Civil War
- United States Colored Troops
