= Second Battle of Charleston Harbor order of battle =

The order of battle for the Second Battle of Charleston Harbor (also known as the Siege of Charleston Harbor) includes:

- Second Battle of Charleston Harbor order of battle: Confederate
- Second Battle of Charleston Harbor order of battle: Union
