= Quincy Adams Gillmore =

American general (1825–1888)

Quincy A. Gillmore
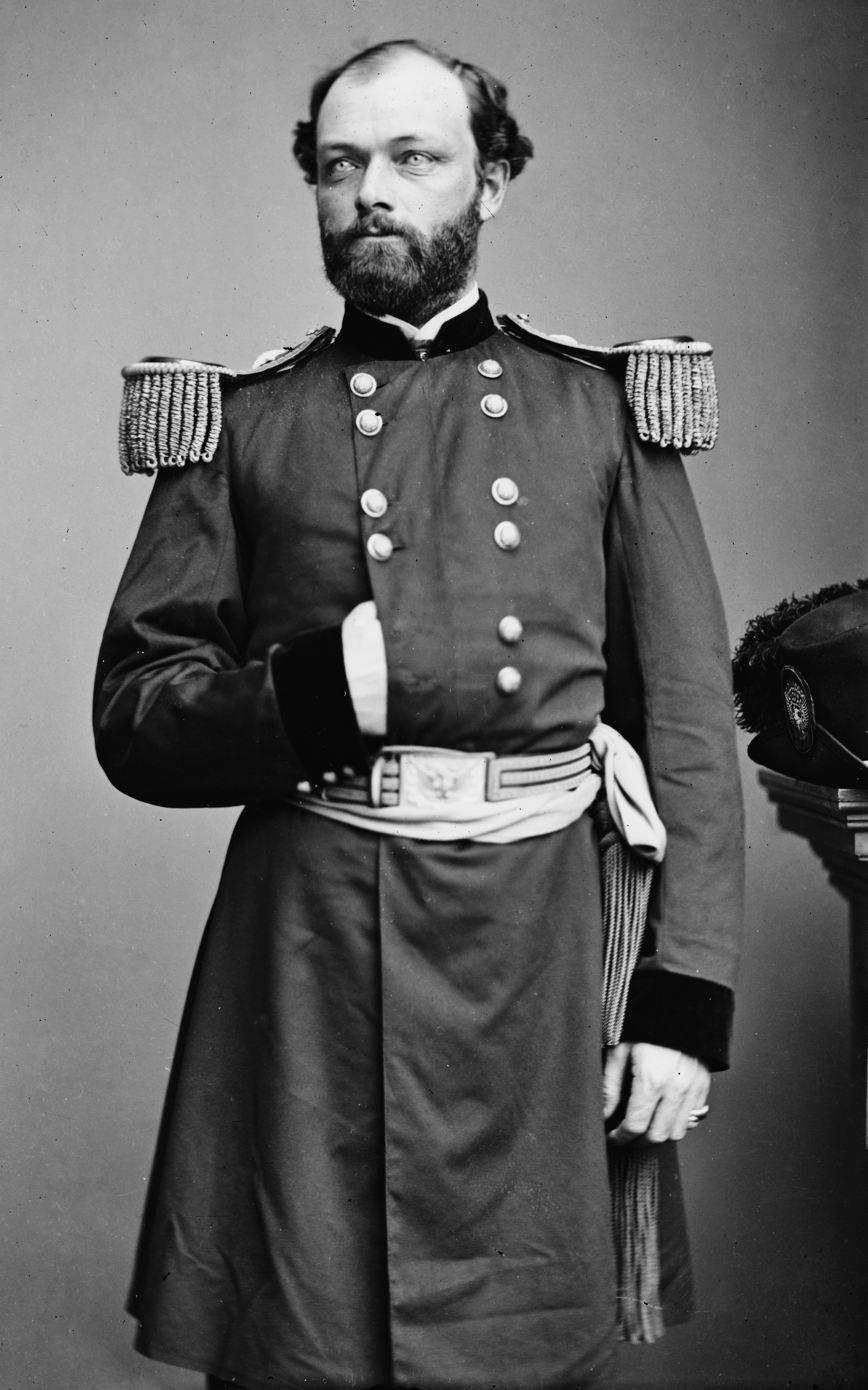
- Civil War–era portrait of Gillmore
- Born: February 28, 1825; Black River (now Lorain), Ohio, U.S.
- Died: April 7, 1888 (aged 63); Brooklyn, New York, U.S.
- Military career
- Allegiance: United States of America; Union
- Branch: United States Army; Union Army
- Service years: 1849–1888
- Rank: Major General
- Commands: X Corps
- Conflicts: American Civil War; Siege of Fort Pulaski; Battle of Somerset; First Battle of Fort Wagner; Second Battle of Fort Wagner; Siege of Charleston Harbor; Battle of Proctor's Creek; Battle of Fort Stevens
- Awards: Gillmore Medal

Quincy Adams Gillmore (February 28, 1825 – April 7, 1888) was an American civil engineer, author, and a general in the Union Army during the American Civil War. He was noted for his actions in the Union victory at Fort Pulaski, where his modern rifled artillery readily pounded the fort's exterior stone walls, an action that essentially rendered stone fortifications obsolete. He earned an international reputation as an organizer of siege operations and helped revolutionize the use of naval gunnery.

== Early life and career ==
Gillmore was born and raised in Black River (now the City of Lorain) in Lorain County, Ohio. He was named after the president-elect at the time of his birth, John Quincy Adams.

Gillmore entered the United States Military Academy at West Point, New York, in 1845. He graduated in 1849, first in a class of 43 members. Gillmore was appointed to the engineers and was promoted to first lieutenant in 1856. From 1849 until 1852, he was engaged in constructing the fortifications at Hampton Roads in coastal Virginia. For the next four years, Gillmore was instructor of Practical Military Engineering at West Point and designed a new riding school. He was conferred an honorary A.M. degree by Oberlin College in 1856.

Beginning in 1856, Gillmore served as a purchasing agent for the Army in New York City. He was promoted to captain on August 6, 1861.

== Civil War ==
=== Engineering duty on the Atlantic Coast ===
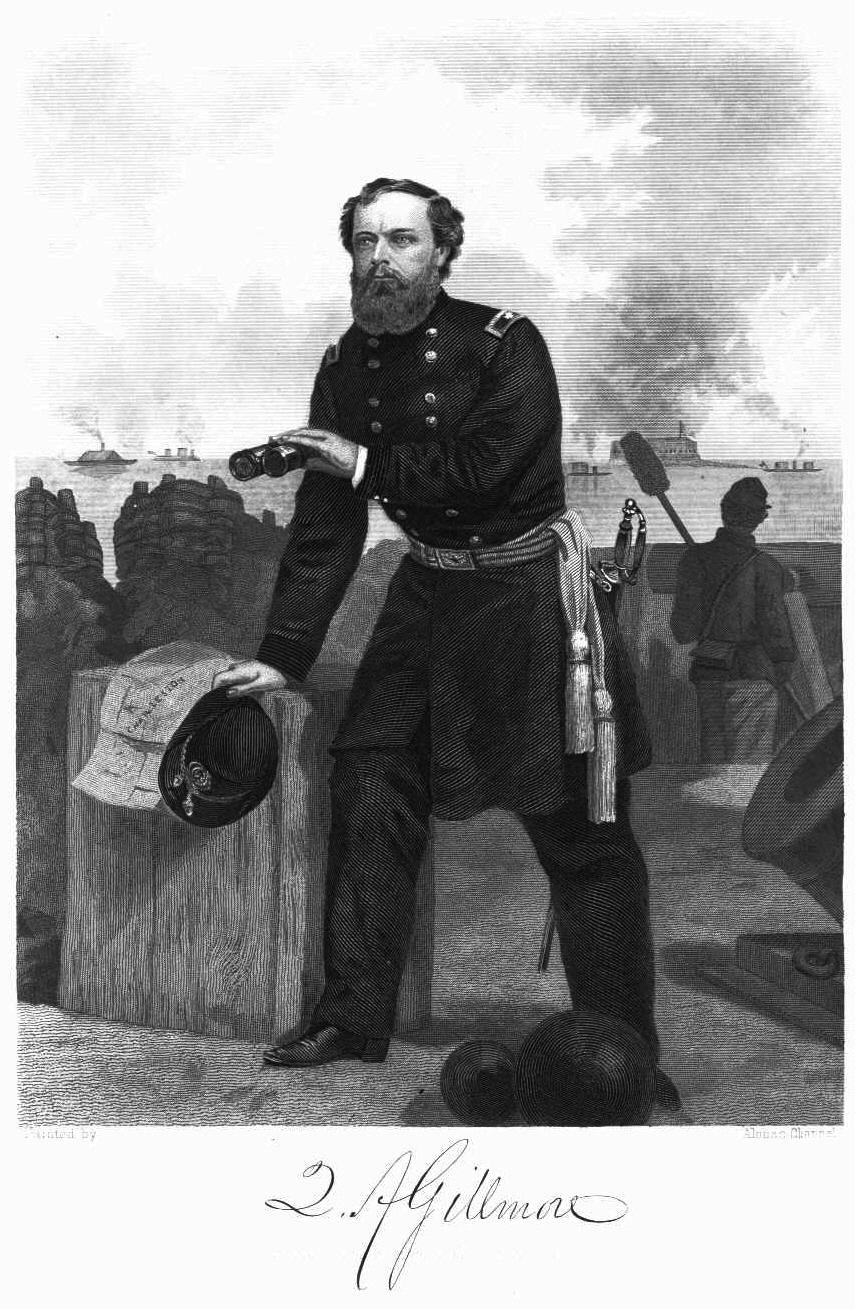
Gillmore at Charleston Harbor, 1863

With the outbreak of the Civil War in early 1861, Gillmore was assigned to the staff of Brigadier General Thomas W. Sherman and accompanied him to Port Royal, South Carolina. After being appointed as a brigadier general, Gillmore took charge of the siege operations against Fort Pulaski. A staunch advocate of the relatively new naval rifled guns, he was the first officer to effectively use them to knock out an enemy stone fortification. More than 5,000 artillery shells fell on Pulaski from a range of 1,700 yards during the short siege, which resulted in the fort's surrender after its walls were breached.

The result of the efforts to breach a fort of such strength and at such a distance confers high honor on the engineering skill and self-reliant capacity of General Gilmore. Failure in an attempt made in opposition to the opinion of the ablest engineers in the army would have destroyed him. Success, which in this case is wholly attributable to his talent, energy, and independence, deserves a corresponding reward. — New York Tribune

Although he was one of the best artillerists and engineers in the army he was not well respected by his men.

=== Service in Kentucky ===
After an assignment in New York City, Gillmore traveled to Lexington, Kentucky, where he supervised the construction of Fort Clay on a hilltop commanding the city. January 11, 1863 Gillmore and Horatio Wright inspect the 103rd Ohio Infantry Regiment at Frankfort Kentucky and Fort Hill (Frankfort, Kentucky). Gillmore commanded a division in the Army of Kentucky then the District of Central Kentucky. Though long associated with engineering and artillery, Gillmore's first independent command came at the head of a cavalry expedition against Confederate General John Pegram. Gillmore defeated the Confederates at the battle of Somerset for which he was given a brevet (military) promotion to colonel in the U.S. Army.

=== Return to the Department of the South ===
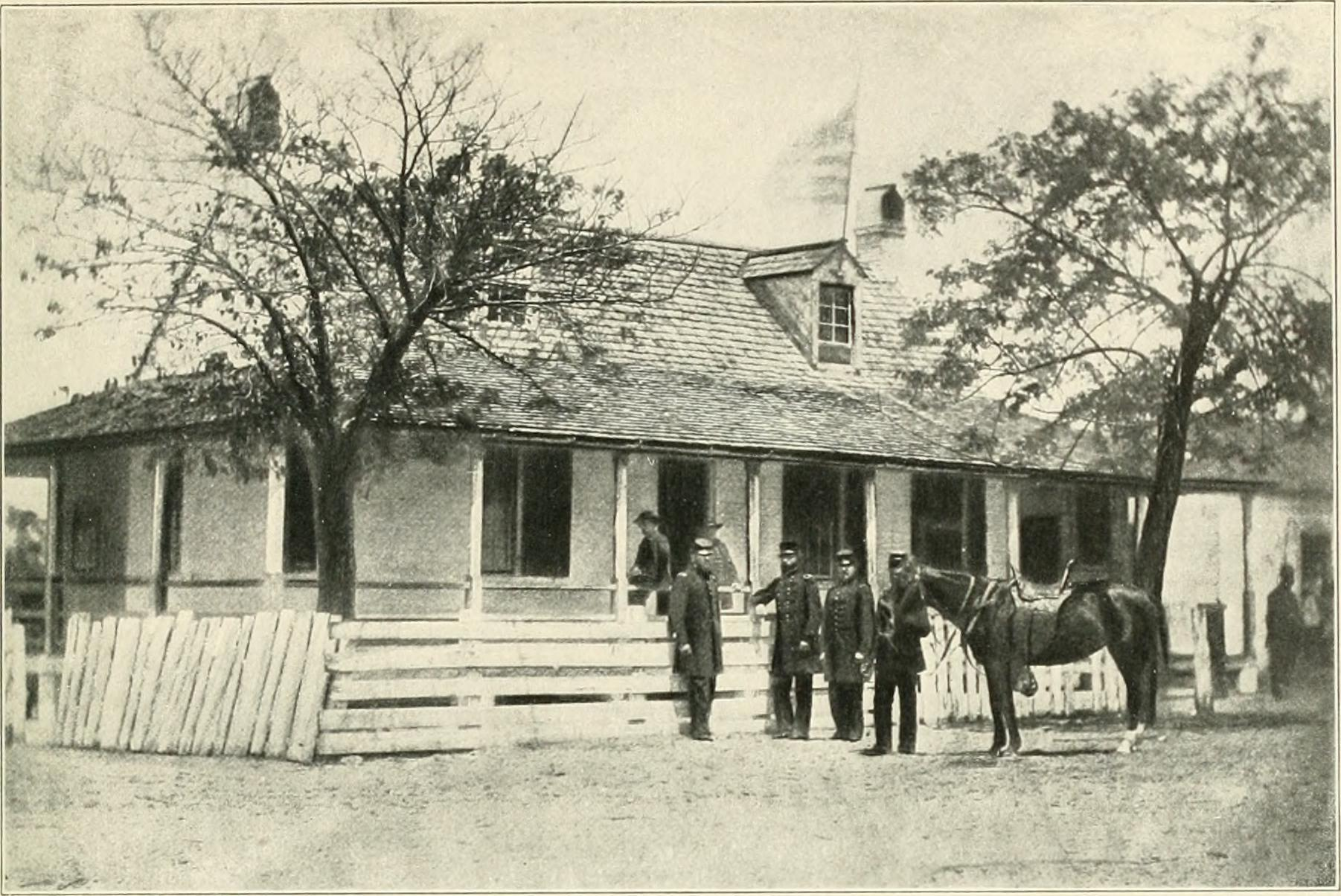
Gillmore's headquarters

Gillmore was assigned to replace Major General David Hunter in charge of the X Corps. In addition, Gillmore commanded the Department of the South, consisting of North and South Carolina, Georgia and Florida, with headquarters at Hilton Head, from June 12, 1863, to May 1, 1864. Under his direction, the army constructed two earthen forts in coastal South Carolina—Fort Mitchel and Fort Holbrook, located in the Spanish Wells area near Hilton Head Island.

He then turned his attention against Charleston, South Carolina. Initially successful in an attack on the southern end of Morris Island on July 10, Gillmore had enough confidence to assault Fort Wagner on the north end of the island. The following day he launched the first attack on Fort Wagner which was defeated. He assembled a larger assault force and with the assistance of John A. Dahlgren's naval fleet planned a second attack. On July 18, 1863, Gillmore's troops were repulsed with heavy losses in the Second Battle of Fort Wagner. Gillmore's divisional commander, General Truman Seymour was wounded and two brigade commanders, George Crockett Strong and Haldimand S. Putnam were killed in the attack.

==== The Gillmore Medal ====
First issued on October 28, 1863, the Gillmore Medal (also called the Fort Sumter Medal) was struck and issued by Gilmore to all Union soldiers who had served under his command in the fighting around Charleston during 1863.

=== Gillmore Orders His Command Integrated ===
Among the troops who assaulted Ft. Wagner was the 54th Massachusetts, a regiment of African-Americans led (as required by regulation) by white commissioned officers. Gillmore had ordered that his forces be integrated and that African-Americans were not to be assigned menial tasks only, such as KP or latrine duty, but instead they were to carry arms into battle. They and their assault on Ft. Wagner were the subject of the 1989 Civil War movie Glory.

=== The Swamp Angel ===
Gillmore decided on siege operations to capture Fort Wagner using innovative technology such as the 25-barreled Requa gun and calcium flood light to blind opponents during trenching efforts. He also implanted a massive Parrott rifle, nicknamed the "Swamp Angel", which fired 200-pound shots into the city of Charleston itself. Despite the swampy ground Union troops were able to work their way toward Fort Wagner. Meanwhile, Gillmore's artillery pounded Fort Sumter into rubble. On September 7, 1863, Gillmore's forces captured Fort Wagner.

In February 1864, Gillmore sent troops to Florida under the command of General Truman Seymour. Despite orders from Gillmore not to advance into the interior of the state, General Seymour advanced toward Tallahassee, the capitol, and fought the largest battle in Florida, the Battle of Olustee, which resulted in a Union defeat.

=== Virginia and Washington DC ===
In early May, Gillmore and the X Corps were transferred to the Army of the James and shipped to Virginia. They took part in the Bermuda Hundred operations and played a principal role in the disastrous Drewry's Bluff action. Gillmore openly feuded with his superior, Benjamin F. Butler over the blame for the defeat. Butler relieved Gillmore of his command who asked for reassignment and left for Washington, D.C. In July 1864, Gillmore helped organized new recruits and invalids into a 20,000-man force to help protect the city from a threat by 10,000 Confederates under Jubal A. Early, who had reached the outer defenses of the Union capital. Federal reinforcements from the Gulf coast were being transferred East at the time and Gillmore was put in command of a detachment of the XIX Corps which had been quickly diverted to the defense of the capital at the battle of Fort Stevens.

=== Close of the War ===
With the threat to Washington over the XIX Corps was transferred to the Army of the Shenandoah and Gillmore was reassigned to the Western Theater as inspector of military fortifications. As the war was drawing to an end he was reassigned to command of the Department of the South one final time and was in command when Charleston and Fort Sumter were finally turned over to Union forces. He received brevet promotions to Brigadier General and Major General in the U.S. Army for the campaign against Battery Wagner, Morris Island and Fort Sumter dated March 13, 1865.

With the war over, he resigned from the volunteer army on December 5, 1865, and returned to being a major in the Corps of Engineers.

== Postbellum career ==
Gillmore returned to New York City after the war. There he became a prominent civil engineer, authoring several books and articles on structural materials, including cement. Gillmore served on the city's Rapid Transit Commission that planned elevated trains and mass public transportation, and led efforts to improve the harbor and coastal defenses. Socially, he was a prominent member of the University Club of New York.

Gillmore performed engineering work in other areas as well. He was involved in the reconstruction of fortifications along the Atlantic coast (including some that he had participated in destroying during the war). He was promoted to lieutenant colonel on June 13, 1874, and then to colonel on February 20, 1883. Gillmore was conferred an honorary Ph.D. degree by Rutgers College in 1878. He became a member of the newly created Mississippi River Commission on June 30, 1879, and served as its president from 1879 to 1882 and again from 1884 until his death.

General Gillmore died at Brooklyn, New York, at the age of 63. His son and grandson, both also named Quincy Gillmore, were West Point graduates, officers in the U.S. Army and generals in the New Jersey National Guard. All three Gillmores were buried in Section XXI of the West Point Cemetery.

== In memoriam ==
Some African Americans in the 19th century took the surname "Gillmore" or "Gilmore" as a tribute to the general. The traveling secretary of the Negro League's Kansas City Monarchs from 1920 to 1925 was named Quincy J. Jordan Gilmore. The first name "Quincy" may have originated in the same fashion.

A coal schooner named in his honor, the General Q.A. Gillmore, sank in 1881 in Lake Erie about 45 miles west of Lorain, near Kelleys Island. The shipwreck remains in the shallow waters of the lake.

A second ship was launched bearing his name, called the "Q.A. Gillmore." It was a steam-powered tugboat "Hull #24" built for the Great Lakes Towing Company of Cleveland, Ohio, and launched around 1912–13. It operated on the Great Lakes and participated in rescues of ships during the notable Great Lakes storm of 1913.

== Books ==
- The Siege and Reduction of Fort Pulaski (1863) (ISBN 0939631075)
- Engineer and artillery operations against the defences of Charleston harbor in 1863: (1865)
- The Strength of the Building Stones of the United States (1874)
- A Practical Treatise on Roads, Streets, and Pavements (1876)
- Limes, Hydraulic Cements, and Mortars (ISBN 1933998245)

== See also ==
- List of American Civil War generals (Union)
- Battle of Fort Pulaski
