= Second Battle of Charleston Harbor order of battle: Confederate =

The following Confederate Army units and commanders fought in the Siege of Charleston Harbor of the American Civil War. The Union order of battle is listed separately.

The following lists contain the commanders and units involved in the operations against Charleston Harbor from July to September 1863. The first phase from July 10–18 includes the initial engagements at First Fort Wagner, Grimball's Landing and Second Fort Wagner. The second phase from July 19-September 8 includes siege operations against Charleston Harbor and Fort Sumter.

== Abbreviations used ==
=== Military rank ===
- Gen = General
- LTG = Lieutenant General
- MG = Major General
- BG = Brigadier General
- Col = Colonel
- Ltc = Lieutenant Colonel
- Maj = Major
- Cpt = Captain
- Lt = Lieutenant
- Sgt = Sergeant

=== Other ===
- w = wounded
- mw = mortally wounded
- k =killed
- c = captured

== Initial Engagements (July 10–18, 1863) ==
=== Department of South Carolina, Georgia and Florida ===
Gen Pierre G. T. Beauregard

==== First District ====
BG Roswell S. Ripley

Division	Post	Regiments and Others
First Sub-Division "James Island" Col Charles H. Simonton until 10 July; BG Johnson Hagood	Secessionville	25th South Carolina Infantry: Ltc John G. Presley; 20th South Carolina Infantry (7 companies): Ltc Olin M. Dantzler; 1st South Carolina Light Battery: Cpt Francis D. Blake
First Sub-Division "James Island" Col Charles H. Simonton until 10 July; BG Johnson Hagood	Clark House	Company D, Palmetto Battalion (Wagner Artillery): Cpt Charles E. Kanapaux; Company G, Palmetto Battalion (DeSaussure Artillery): Cpt William L. De Pass
First Sub-Division "James Island" Col Charles H. Simonton until 10 July; BG Johnson Hagood	West James Island	Company E, Palmetto Battalion: Cpt John D. Johnson; Company H, Palmetto Battalion: Cpt Thomas A. Holtzclaw; Company I, Palmetto Battalion: Cpt J.R. Bowden; Company K, Palmetto Battalion: Cpt Samuel M. Richardson
First Sub-Division "James Island" Col Charles H. Simonton until 10 July; BG Johnson Hagood	Fort Pemberton	Company A, Lucas Battalion: Cpt John A Gary; Company B, Lucas Battalion: Cpt Robert Pringle; Company C, Lucas Battalion: Cpt Theodore B. Hayne
First Sub-Division "James Island" Col Charles H. Simonton until 10 July; BG Johnson Hagood	Fort Lamar	Company B, 2nd South Carolina Artillery: Cpt J.W. Lancaster; Company K, 2nd South Carolina Artillery: Cpt Harry C. Culbreath
First Sub-Division "James Island" Col Charles H. Simonton until 10 July; BG Johnson Hagood	Fort Johnson	Company I, 2nd South Carolina Artillery: Cpt Joseph B. Humbert
First Sub-Division "James Island" Col Charles H. Simonton until 10 July; BG Johnson Hagood	Fort Glover	Company G, 2nd South Carolina Artillery: Cpt George W. Stallings
First Sub-Division "James Island" Col Charles H. Simonton until 10 July; BG Johnson Hagood	Batteries Haig and Palmer	Company C, 2nd South Carolina Artillery: Cpt Medicus Rickenbacker
First Sub-Division "James Island" Col Charles H. Simonton until 10 July; BG Johnson Hagood	East James Island	Company A, 2nd South Carolina Artillery: Cpt William A. Hunter; Company D, 2nd South Carolina Artillery: Cpt William Charles; Company E, 2nd South Carolina Artillery: Cpt B. E. Dickson; Company H, 2nd South Carolina Artillery: Cpt William Kennedy; Company F, 2nd South Carolina Artillery: Cpt Thomas K. Lagare
First Sub-Division "James Island" Col Charles H. Simonton until 10 July; BG Johnson Hagood	Cavalry	5th South Carolina Cavalry (3 companies): Ltc Robert J. Jeffords
2nd Sub-Division Col Lawrence M. Keitt	Fort Moultrie	1st South Carolina Artillery (4 companies)
2nd Sub-Division Col Lawrence M. Keitt	Battery Bee	1st South Carolina Artillery (2 companies)
2nd Sub-Division Col Lawrence M. Keitt	Battery Marshall	1st South Carolina Artillery (3 companies)
2nd Sub-Division Col Lawrence M. Keitt	Battery Beauregard	1st South Carolina Artillery (1 company)
2nd Sub-Division Col Lawrence M. Keitt	Palmetto Battery	1st South Carolina Artillery (1 company)
2nd Sub-Division Col Lawrence M. Keitt	Christ Church	5th South Carolina Cavalry (2 companies); Sparks' (South Carolina) Cavalry Company
2nd Sub-Division Col Lawrence M. Keitt	Mount Pleasant	20th South Carolina Infantry (3 companies); Santee (South Carolina) Artillery: Cpt Christopher Gaillard
Third Sub-Division "Morris Island" Col Robert F. Graham 9-12 July; BG William B. Taliaferro 12-18 July; BG Johnson Hagood 19-22 July	Battery Mitchell "Oyster Point"	21st South Carolina Infantry (Detachment): Maj George W. McIver; Company I, 1st South Carolina Artillery: Cpt John C. Mitchell; Company E, 1st South Carolina Artillery: Cpt J. Ravenel Macbeth; Company H (Detachment), 1st South Carolina Artillery: Lt H. W. Frost; Company D, 1st South Carolina Artillery (serving as infantry): Cpt Charles T. Haskell
Third Sub-Division "Morris Island" Col Robert F. Graham 9-12 July; BG William B. Taliaferro 12-18 July; BG Johnson Hagood 19-22 July	Battery Wagner	1st South Carolina Infantry (Cos. H and I); 21st South Carolina Infantry: Col Robert F. Graham; 31st North Carolina Infantry; 51st North Carolina Infantry; 22nd Georgia Battalion; 63rd Georgia Infantry (Cos. B, K and detachment of D); Charleston Battalion; Gist Guard (South Carolina) Heavy Artillery Company: Cpt Charles E. Chichester; Mathewes (South Carolina) Heavy Artillery Company: Cpt John E. Mathewes; Company A, 1st South Carolina Artillery
Third Sub-Division "Morris Island" Col Robert F. Graham 9-12 July; BG William B. Taliaferro 12-18 July; BG Johnson Hagood 19-22 July	Battery Gregg	31st North Carolina Infantry; 5th South Carolina Cavalry (Detachment of Couriers); Company H (Detachment), 1st South Carolina Artillery: Cpt Henry R. Lesesne; Company G (Detachment), Palmetto Battalion
Fourth Sub-Division "Inner Harbor" Col Alfred M. Rhett	Fort Sumter	1st South Carolina Artillery (5 companies)
Fourth Sub-Division "Inner Harbor" Col Alfred M. Rhett	Castle Pinckney and Fort Ripley Cpt William H. Peroneau	Company K, 1st South Carolina Artillery
Fourth Sub-Division "Inner Harbor" Col Alfred M. Rhett	Charleston	5th South Carolina Cavalry (Detachment); Charleston Battalion: Ltc Peter C. Gaillard; South Carolina Siege Train: Maj Edward Manigault

== Siege Operations (July 19-September 8, 1863) ==
=== Department of South Carolina, Georgia and Florida ===
Gen Pierre G. T. Beauregard

==== First District ====
BG Roswell S. Ripley

Division	Brigade	Regiments and Others
First Sub-Division BG William B. Taliaferro	Infantry	Olmstead's Command: Col Charles H. Olmstead; 1st Georgia Infantry (4 companies); 12th Georgia Artillery Battalion (4 companies): Ltc Henry D. Capers; 6th Georgia Infantry: Col John T. Lofton; 19th Georgia Infantry: Col A.J. Hutchins; 23rd Georgia Infantry Maj. M.R. Ballenger; 27th Georgia Infantry: Maj. James Gardner; 28th Georgia Infantry: Col Tully Graybill; 32nd Georgia Infantry: Col George B. Harrison II; 54th Georgia Infantry: Col Charleton H. Way; 8th North Carolina Infantry: Col Henry M. Shaw; 31st North Carolina Infantry: Col John V. Jordon
First Sub-Division BG William B. Taliaferro	Cavalry	5th South Carolina Cavalry (5 companies): Col John Dunovant
First Sub-Division BG William B. Taliaferro	Artillery	1st South Carolina Artillery (5 companies): Maj Ormsby Blanding; 2nd South Carolina Artillery (9 companies): Col Andrew D. Frederick; 3rd (Palmetto) South Carolina Artillery Battalion (5 companies): Ltc Edward B. White; 18th South Carolina Artillery Battalion "South Carolina Siege Train": Maj Edward Manigault; 12th Georgia Artillery Battalion, Company C: Cpt W.W. Billopp; 15th (Lucas') South Carolina Heavy Artillery Battalion: Maj Jonathan J. Lucas; Chatham (Georgia) Artillery Company: Cpt John F. Wheaton; Marion (South Carolina) Artillery Company: Cpt E.L. Parker; Mathewes (South Carolina) Heavy Artillery Company: Cpt John R. Mathewes
First Sub-Division BG William B. Taliaferro	Anderson's Brigade BG George T. Anderson (arrived Sept 9)	7th Georgia Infantry: Col William W. White; 8th Georgia Infantry: Col John R. Towers; 9th Georgia Infantry: Col Benjamin Beck; 11th Georgia Infantry: Col Francis H. Little; 59th Georgia Infantry: Col Jack Brown
First Sub-Division BG William B. Taliaferro	Hagood's Brigade BG Johnson Hagood	11th South Carolina Infantry: Col Frederick H. Gantt; 21st South Carolina Infantry: Col Robert F. Graham; 25th South Carolina Infantry: Col Charles H. Simonton
Second Sub-Division; BG Alfred H. Colquitt until Aug; BG Thomas L. Clingman	Infantry	51st North Carolina Infantry: Col Hector McKethan; 61st North Carolina Infantry: Col James D. Radcliffe; 20th South Carolina Infantry: Col Lawrence M. Keitt; 7th South Carolina Battalion: Ltc Patrick H. Nelson; 18th Georgia Infantry Battalion (3 companies): Maj William S. Basinger
Second Sub-Division; BG Alfred H. Colquitt until Aug; BG Thomas L. Clingman	Cavalry	Company E, 5th South Carolina Cavalry: Col Louis A. Whilden; Peterkin's (South Carolina) Cavalry Company: Cpt J.A. Peterkin; Sparks' (South Carolina) Cavalry Company: Cpt A.D. Sparks
Second Sub-Division; BG Alfred H. Colquitt until Aug; BG Thomas L. Clingman	Artillery	1st South Carolina Artillery: Col William Butler; Company K, 1st South Carolina Artillery: Cpt Alfred S. Gaillard; German (South Carolina) Artillery: Cpt Frederick W. Wagener; Macbeth (South Carolina) Artillery Company: Cpt B.A. Jeter
Second Sub-Division; BG Alfred H. Colquitt until Aug; BG Thomas L. Clingman	Evans' Brigade BG Nathan G. Evans	17th South Carolina Infantry: Col Fritz W. McMaster; 18th South Carolina Infantry: Col William H. Wallace; 22nd South Carolina Infantry: Ltc James O'Connell; 23rd South Carolina Infantry: Col Henry L. Benbow; 26th South Carolina Infantry: Col Alexander D. Smith; Holcombe Legion: Ltc William J. Crawley
Harbor Forts	Fort Sumter Maj Stephen Elliott, Jr.	Charleston Battalion: Maj Julius A. Blake
Harbor Forts	Castle Pinckney and Fort Ripley	1st S.C.A., Company G: Cpt William H. Peronneau
Charleston BG Wilmot G. DeSaussure	Infantry	1st South Carolina Militia: Col Edward Magrath; 18th South Carolina Militia: Col John E. Carew; 5th South Carolina State Troops: Col James H. Williams; Cadet Battalion: Maj John B. White
Charleston BG Wilmot G. DeSaussure	Cavalry	5th South Carolina Cavalry (Cos. D and H): Ltc Robert J. Jeffords; Company K, 4th South Carolina Cavalry: Cpt Robert H. Colcock
Charleston BG Wilmot G. DeSaussure	Artillery	1st S.C.A. (Cos. D and H); 1st South Carolina Militia Artillery: Col John A. Wagener; Company A, Palmetto Battalion (Furman Artillery): Cpt William E. Eale; Gist Guard (South Carolina) Artillery Company: Cpt Charles E. Chichester
Charleston BG Wilmot G. DeSaussure	Sailors	Boat details (3 companies): Cpt Thomas J. China
Reserve	St. Andrew's Parrish BG Henry A. Wise (arrived Sept 19)	4th Virginia Heavy Artillery [serving as infantry]: Col Thomas J. Goode; 26th Virginia Infantry: Col Powhatan R. Page; 46th Virginia Infantry: Col Richard T. W. Duke; 59th Virginia Infantry: Col William B. Tabb

=== Morris Island Commanders (July 9-September 7) ===
The commanders of Morris Island, scene of the majority of fighting, proved to be ever fluctuating. The following is a list and dates of the officers who commanded Morris Island during the campaign.

Commander	Dates
Col Robert F. Graham	9-12 July
BG William B. Taliaferro	13-18 July
BG Johnson Hagood	19-22 July
BG William B. Taliaferro	23-25 July
BG Alfred H. Colquitt	26-27 July
BG Thomas L. Clingman	28 July-1 August
Col Lawrence M. Keitt	2-5 Aug
BG Johnson Hagood	6-10 Aug
Col George P. Harrison Jr.	11-15 Aug
Col Lawrence M. Keitt	16-21 Aug
BG Johnson Hagood	22-27 Aug
BG Alfred H. Colquitt	28 Aug-3 September
Col Lawrence M. Keitt	3-7 Sept

== See also ==
- South Carolina in the American Civil War
