= Independent Battalion of New York Volunteer Infantry =

Independent Battalion of New York Volunteer Infantry (Enfants Perdu Regiment)
- Active: April 18, 1862 – January 30, 1864
- Country: United States of America
- Allegiance: New York
- Branch: Union Army
- Type: Battalion
- Role: Infantry
- Size: 6 companies (initially); 10 companies
- Organized at: New York City
- Nicknames: German Legion; New York Corps of Light Infantry
- Engagements: American Civil War: Action at Williamsburg; First Battle of Fort Wagner; Siege of Charleston Harbor; Operations against the Defenses of Charleston

Commanders
- Notable commanders: Lt.Col. Felix Confort; Lt.Col. Simon Levy

The Independent Battalion of New York Volunteer Infantry, also known as the German Legion or the New York Corps of Light Infantry, was an infantry battalion from New York City that served in the Union Army during the American Civil War. It was formed in April 1862, originally as the Enfants Perdu Regiment, but was immediately downgraded to a battalion as it couldn't muster enough companies. The unit served in the Carolinas for the duration of its existence. It was disbanded in January 1864, the men being transferred to the 47th and 48th infantry regiments and to the 1st Engineer Regiment.

== Organisation ==
The battalion initially fielded only 6 companies, thus not serving as regiment, and stayed a battalion despite mustering additional companies over time in 1862 and 1863.

- Company A – Cpt. Joseph Torrens
- Company B – Cpt. Jules F. Rochefort
- Company C – Cpt. Joseph Schmidt Kraus
- Company D – Cpt. Charles Daillet
- Company E – Cpt. Francois Boucher
- Company F – Cpt. Michael Schmidt
- Company G – Cpt. Thaddedus Ferris
- Company H – Cpt. Ferdinand Levy (1862)
- Company I – Cpt. John G. Gundlack
- Company K – Cpt. Ferdinand Levy (1863)

== Commanders ==
- Lieutenant Colonel Felix Confort (resigned May 9, 1863)
- Lieutenant Colonel Simon Levy

== Casualties ==
During its service the battalion lost 9 enlisted men killed and mortally wounded and 52 enlisted men by disease, for a total of 61 men.

== See also ==
- List of New York Civil War units
