= Gillmore Medal =

Obsolete United States Army decoration

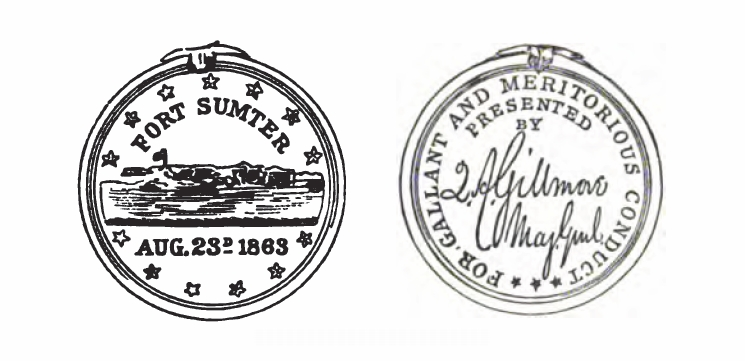
- Gillmore Medal, front and back
- Type: Medal
- Presented by: Department of War
- Status: Obsolete

The Gillmore Medal is a military decoration of the United States Army which was first issued on October 28, 1863. The medal is named after Major General Quincy A. Gillmore who commanded Union troops attempting to seize Fort Wagner in 1863 during the American Civil War.

Also called the Fort Sumter Medal, the Gillmore Medal commemorates the men who served in the fighting around Charleston, South Carolina, in 1863 and was presented to all Union soldiers who had served under General Gillmore’s command. The medal was pinned to the front of a military jacket from a swivel with no attached ribbon.

Since the Gillmore Medal was issued on the local authority of General Gillmore, it was considered an unofficial decoration by the United States Army, but was permitted for wear on a military uniform. In 1905, with the creation of the Civil War Campaign Medal, the Gillmore Medal was declared obsolete.

One such medal was awarded to Albert York (commanding Company I, 100th New York Volunteer Infantry) for gallant and meritorious conduct while participating in the Battle of Morris Island, April 1863. These medals are extremely rare because they are usually coveted by the living heirs and rarely come up for sale.

== See also ==
- Awards and decorations of the United States military

== Notes ==
Gillmore Medal in the Staten Island Historical Society Online Collections Database
