= 3rd New Hampshire Infantry Regiment =

- Active: August 23, 1861 - July 20, 1865
- Country: United States of America
- Allegiance: Union
- Branch: United States Army; Union Army
- Type: Infantry
- Size: 1,047
- Engagements: Battle of Secessionville; First Battle of Fort Wagner; Second Battle of Fort Wagner; Battle of Proctor's Creek; Second Battle of Deep Bottom; Battle of Fort Fisher

3rd New Hampshire Infantry Regiment was an infantry regiment in the Union Army during the American Civil War.

It was organized at Camp Berry in Concord and mustered in on August 23, 1861, for three years service, 1,047 officers and men. The regiment served most of its time on the Atlantic coast in the Carolinas. The 3rd New Hampshire finished the war in North Carolina and were mustered out of Federal service on July 20, 1865, arriving back in Concord on the 28th for final discharge and payment. The 3rd had a total of 198 casualties, with another 154 dying in Confederate prisons, disease, or warfare-related accidents.

Company C had a dog named "Ned" as their mascot. He was described as being very intelligent and well trained. He also had a beautiful collar containing an engraving of Columbia with an Irish harp and American flag the next to large silver eagle.

== Military service ==
After being mustered in, the 3rd New Hampshire left for Long Island, New York, encamping at Camp Winfield Scott at Hempstead Plains. From here, they went to Washington, D.C. and Annapolis, Maryland where the regiment embarked on the steamer Atlantic for the assault on Hilton Head, South Carolina. It was part of the forces used to establish Federal footholds on the South's Atlantic Coast. Except for minor skirmishes with Confederate pickets, they did not see action until June 16, 1862, where it participated in the Battle of Secessionville. The 3rd entered battle with 26 officers and 597 men and suffered 104 casualties—27 of them killed or mortally wounded.

In August 1862, the undersized Company H, consisting of 48 men, was stationed at the northern end of Pinckney Island. A Confederate raid overran this position, resulting in seven deaths and 36 prisoners of war, who were later exchanged.

The 3rd New Hampshire then engaged in amphibious operations for several months and was assigned to one of the brigades to attack Fort Wagner. From July 10–13, 1863, the 3rd attempted the first assault, which failed, losing seven killed and 21 wounded. The regiment lost another eight in a second failed assault which took place July 18, 1863, led by Captain James F. Randlett.

During the spring of 1864, the 3rd New Hampshire was transferred north to Virginia where they joined the 10th Corps, also known as the Army of the James. Soon after, they were heavily engaged at Drewry's Bluff on May 16, 1864, where sixty-six New Hampshire men were killed or wounded. On August 16, 1864, they also fought at Deep Bottom, Virginia, where Lt. Colonel Josiah Plimpton, in command of the regiment, was mortally wounded.

On August 23, 1864, the three-year term of service was up for the original volunteers, and those who did not reenlist were mustered out and sent home. Only 180 men remained of the thousand who had left Concord three years prior

In January 1865, the 3rd New Hampshire also took part in the successful attack on Fort Fisher in North Carolina.

== Demographics ==
Out of the 900 men in the regiment, 450 were farmers, 69 laborers, 44 machinists, 31 carpenters, 30 manufacturers, 27 painters, 15 teamsters, and 16 clerks. The origin of the 3rd New Hampshire is as follows: six hundred twenty-nine (629) from New Hampshire, 118 from Massachusetts, 116 from Ireland, 81 from Vermont, 70 from Maine, and 31 from New York, and the remaining from various other places. Company C, commanded by Capt. Michael Donohoe, was almost entirely Irish.

== See also ==
- List of New Hampshire Civil War Units
