= Joshua B. Howell =

American general

Joshua Blackwood Howell
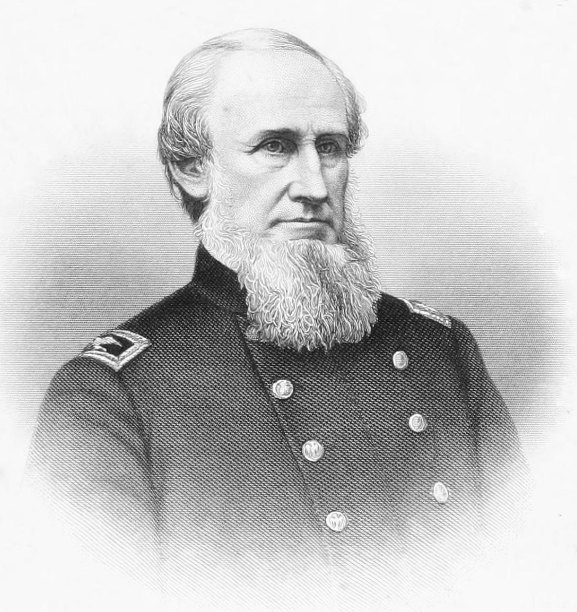
- Born: September 11, 1806; Woodbury, New Jersey
- Died: September 14, 1864 (aged 58); Petersburg, Virginia
- Burial place: Eglington Cemetery, Clarksboro, New Jersey
- Military career
- Allegiance: United States of America; Union
- Branch: United States Army; Union Army
- Rank: Colonel; Brigadier General (posthumous)
- Commands: 85th Pennsylvania Infantry
- Conflicts: American Civil War; Peninsula Campaign; Goldsborough Expedition; Siege of Charleston Harbor; Bermuda Hundred Campaign; Siege of Petersburg
- Other work: Lawyer

Joshua B. Howell (September 11, 1806 – September 14, 1864) was a Union Army officer during the American Civil War. He served in Southeast Virginia and the Carolinas. He was mortally wounded late in the war following a horse riding accident.

== Early life ==
Howell was born in New Jersey in 1806 on his family's estate named "Fancy Hill". His father, Colonel Joshua Ladd Howell, had served in the War of 1812, and his grandfather, also named Joshua Ladd Howell, served as a quartermaster during the American Revolution.

== Early war service ==
In 1861, at the outbreak of the Civil War, Howell was appointed Brigadier General in the Pennsylvania Militia. He was also commissioned colonel of the 85th Pennsylvania Volunteer Infantry with which he would serve during the war. His regiment was assigned to the IV Corps during the Peninsula Campaign. Following the battle of Malvern Hill, Colonel Howell and the 85th Pennsylvania were transferred to North Carolina, serving under the XVIII Corps. Howell fought in the Goldsborough Expedition at the battles of Kinston, White Hall and Goldsborough.

== Charleston ==
For the next 6 months, Howell was in command of a brigade in the XVIII Corps along the North Carolina coast. In July 1863, his brigade was transferred to the X Corps in the Department of the South. Howell's brigade was designated the 2nd Brigade, Terry's Division, X Corps and took part in the siege of Charleston Harbor. At one point during the siege, Howell was wounded in the head when a Confederate artillery shell from Fort Wagner hit the bombproof he was in. His soldiers feared he was dead, but his wound proved to be minor, and Howell returned to his command. He kept a piece of the shell fragment with him in remembrance of his close call.

== Petersburg and death ==
In 1864, the X Corps was transferred to the Army of the James in conjunction with Ulysses S. Grant's Overland Campaign. Howell led his brigade during the Bermuda Hundred Campaign and the early stages of the Siege of Petersburg where he was occasionally in command of a division. He happened to be acting commander of the 3rd Division, X Corps, when he was severely injured in a fall from his horse. His injuries proved to be mortal, and Colonel Howell died in the field hospital of the 85th Pennsylvania on September 14, 1864, three days after his 58th birthday. He was posthumously promoted to brigadier general, backdated to September 13, 1864. He was interred in Clarksboro, New Jersey.

== Memorial ==
In the fall of 1864 the 32nd U.S.Colored Infantry constructed fortifications on Hilton Head Island to protect the Freedmen's town of Mitchelville. General John G. Foster named the post Fort Howell in honor of Colonel Howell.

== Notes ==
- Eicher, John H., & Eicher, David J., Civil War High Commands, Stanford University Press, 2001, ISBN 0-8047-3641-3.
- Wise, Stephen R. (1994) Gate of Hell: Campaign for Charleston Harbor, 1863.
  University of South Carolina Press, Columbia, ISBN 0-87249-985-5.
