= Billinghurst Requa Battery =

Billinghurst Requa Battery Gun
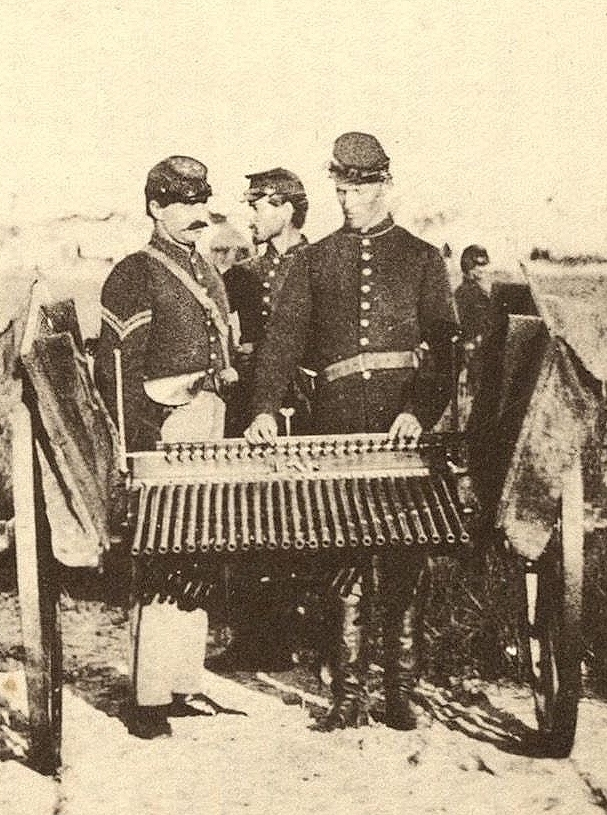
- Place of origin: United States

Service history
- Used by: U.S Union Forces; C.S Forces; France; Germany (captured)
- Wars: American Civil War, Franco-Prussian War

Production history
- Designer: Dr. Josephus Requa
- Unit cost: $500 (During American Civil war) $ 17920 current equivalent

Specifications
- Barrel length: 2 ft (0.61 m)
- Crew: 3
- Cartridge weight: 1 oz (28 g)
- Caliber: 0.58 in (1.5 cm)
- Barrels: 25
- Rate of fire: 175 rounds/min
- Effective firing range: 1,800 ft (550 m)
- Feed system: 25 round magazine

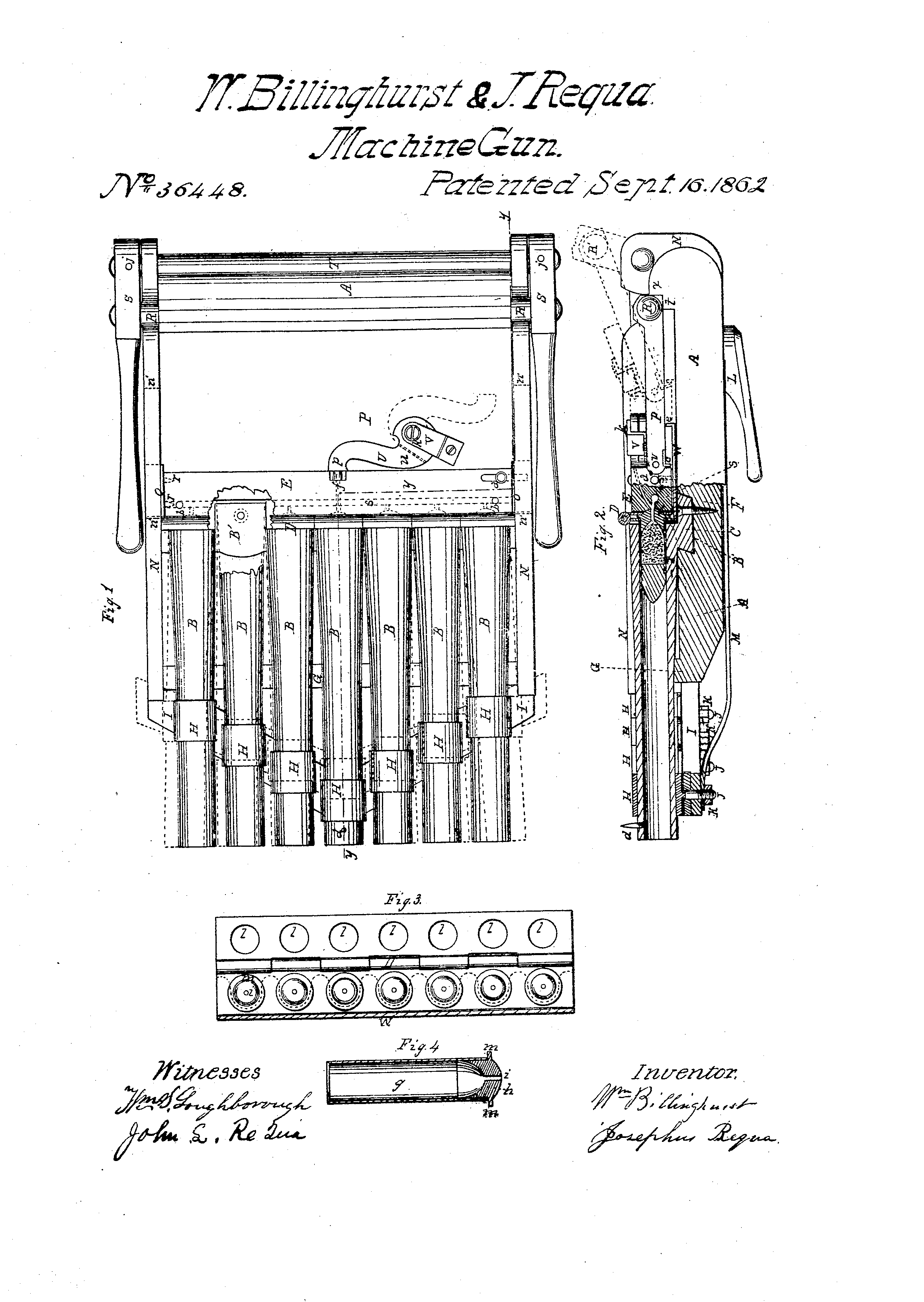
Billinghurst Requa Battery patent application

The Billinghurst Requa Battery gun was an early rapid-fire gun used during the American Civil War. It was invented by a Dr. Josephus Requa (1833–1910), a dentist by profession, who had at the age of 16 spent three years as an apprentice to William Billinghurst (1807–1880), a New York riflemaker.

== Design ==
The gun consisted of twenty-five heavy .58 caliber rifle barrels, each 2 feet (0.61 m) long and mounted together in a secure frame, which could be elevated for range. The frame was then mounted on a two-wheeled carriage. Ammunition was loaded as a long magazine of twenty-five rounds, which were fired by a single percussion cap in a single volley. With a crew of three, it could be reloaded and fired seven times a minute, giving a rate of fire of 175 rounds per minute. The .58 caliber bullets were conical and weighed approximately one ounce. It was also possible to adjust the spread of the guns to make them diverge for use at close range.

== History ==
In 1861 on the suggestion of an Albert Mack, Requa began thinking about the design of a rapid-fire gun. Requa talked with Billinghurst, who he remained friends with and came up with a scale model of a design by 11 July 1861. After it was received favorably, Billinghurst and Requa decided to build a full-scale prototype, which cost approximately $500 to build.

Requa met with General James Wolfe Ripley on 22 April 1862 to propose the idea. Ripley however dismissed Requa with the argument that such a weapon would consume expensive ammunition at such a rate that it would cause logistical problems. Requa then approached President Abraham Lincoln on 1 May 1862, who listened to Requa's explanation of Ripley's dismissal. He gave Requa a note which said: Gen. Ripley, please see Mr. Requa A. Lincoln, May 1, 1862.

Ripley, however, would not move from his position. Requa went back to Lincoln, who then ordered Ripley to arrange a demonstration of the weapon. Two tests were arranged on 12 May 1862 and 24 May 1862 with favorable results. Requa and Billinghurst needed financial backing to proceed with production of the weapon, and arranged for a public demonstration of the weapon as proof to backers. This was conducted on 12 August 1862 at Rochester, New York. At the demonstration, the gun blasted holes in a wooden barrel target setup 1,800 feet (550 m) away in the Genesee River. The backers were impressed, and contracts were drawn up to produce 50 units. A patent numbered 36,448 was also issued on 16 September 1862.

The battery was never officially accepted into service, yet it saw action at the Siege of Port Hudson, Fort Wagner, Fort Sumter and Siege of Petersburg as well as the Battle of Cold Harbor. However, Their limitations gave the Confederates very little trouble.

The Requa Battery gun was deploy by the Confederate forces for defensive purposes like Charleston, and there was no problem of mobility. It weighed 1,382 pounds and was of considerably larger caliber than the Northern version. Prior to the onset of hostilities, the Confederate government acquired a minimum of twenty volley guns, with the possibility of subsequent procurements. Due to fragmented Southern documentation, the precise quantity and tactical deployment of these armaments remain unverified.

A final test of the gun was conducted at the Washington Arsenal in August 1864, with a report issued in 1866 indicating that the gun was reliable and performed well during the testing. As a result, an additional five guns were ordered, but advances in firearms technology soon rendered the weapon obsolete.

Approximately half of their artillery was seized by the Prussians at Sedan, while the remainder was immobilized during the siege of Metz. Consequently, foreign machine guns were procured, with the United States supplying Billinghurst-Requa batteries and various Gatling guns.
