= William Watts Hart Davis =

American journalist

William Watts Hart Davis (July 27, 1820 – December 26, 1910) was a brevetted Brigadier General of the United States Volunteers during the American Civil War. The rank was awarded to him on March 13, 1865, "for gallant and meritorious services, during operations against Charleston, South Carolina." Outside of his military service, he worked as a journalist, author and government official.

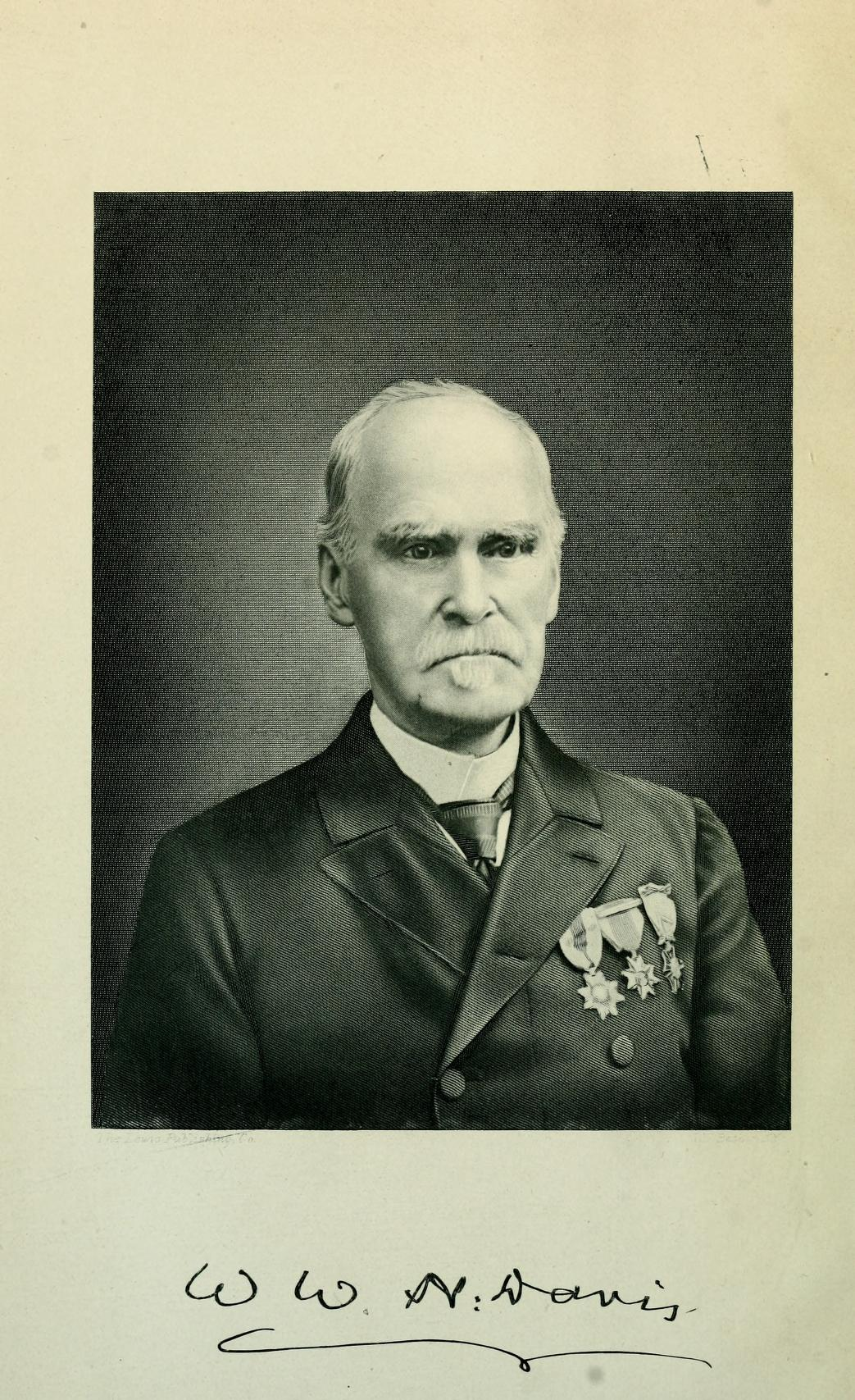
William Watts Harts Davis

Davis was born in Bucks County, Pennsylvania, in 1820 to Major General John Davis and Amy (Hart) Davis. He was first educated at a private school run by Anna Longstreth and later attended a school at the Southampton Baptist Church. In 1832, he was enrolled in the Doylestown Academy. He finished his elementary education at a boarding school in Burlington, New Jersey. In 1841, he began studying at the American Literary, Scientific and Military Academy, now Norwich University, in Norwich, Vermont, graduating in 1842. After graduating, he was hired as a maths teacher and commandant of cadets in the military academy at Portsmouth, Virginia, where he worked for three years. In 1846, while studying law at Harvard, he volunteered for service in the Mexican–American War, enlisting as a private in the 1st Massachusetts Infantry Regiment. He was commissioned first lieutenant of Captain Crowningshield's Company on December 1, 1846. He was mustered out on July 24, 1848, when the war ended. Davis later served in the Civil War, raising his own regiment, the 104th Pennsylvania Regiment, after being given the authority to do so on August 21, 1861.

Davis, an avid historian, founded the Bucks County Historical Society. He wrote several books on topics ranging from local genealogy to military and political history. His books include: El Gringo, or, New Mexico and Her People (1857); A History of the Hart Family (1867); Spanish Conquest of New Mexico (1869); History of Doylestown Guards (1887); The Fries Rebellion, 1798-99: An Armed Resistance (1899); History of Bucks County (1905).

Davis lived in New Mexico from 1853 to 1857, serving as (at various times) US district attorney, attorney general, acting governor, superintendent of Indian affairs, and superintendent of public buildings.

== See also ==
- List of American Civil War brevet generals (Union)
