= First Battle of Fort Wagner =

Battle of the American Civil War

Coordinates: 32.730°N 79.871°W

- Part of the American Civil War
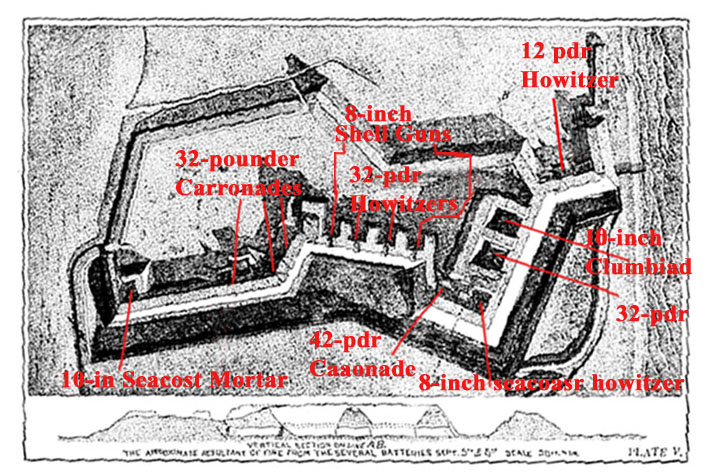
- Plan of Fort Wagner, with overlay showing armament
Date	July 10, 1863 – July 11, 1863
Location	Charleston, South Carolina
Result	Confederate victory

Belligerents
United States (Union)	(Confederate States of America) CSA (Confederacy)

Commanders and leaders
Quincy A. Gillmore; John A. Dahlgren; George C. Strong	P.G.T. Beauregard; Robert F. Graham

Units involved
2nd Division, X Corps (Department of the South)	Fort Wagner garrison

Strength
1 brigade	1,770

Casualties and losses
339 total (49 killed; 123 wounded; 167 captured/missing)	12

The First Battle of Fort Wagner was fought on July 10 and 11, 1863, on Morris Island in Charleston harbor during the American Civil War. An attempt by the Union Army to capture Fort Wagner was repulsed. The more famous Second Battle of Fort Wagner, which involved an assault by the 54th Massachusetts, would be fought on July 18.

== Background ==
In early June 1863, Union Brig. Gen. Quincy A. Gillmore replaced Maj. Gen. David Hunter as commander of the Department of the South. Gillmore, an Army engineer, had successfully captured Fort Pulaski in April 1862. He began preparations for capturing Morris Island and parts of James Island, which dominated the southern approaches to Charleston Harbor. If Union artillery could be placed in those locations, they could assist in the bombardment of Fort Sumter, whose guns prevented the U.S. Navy from entering the harbor.

== Battle ==
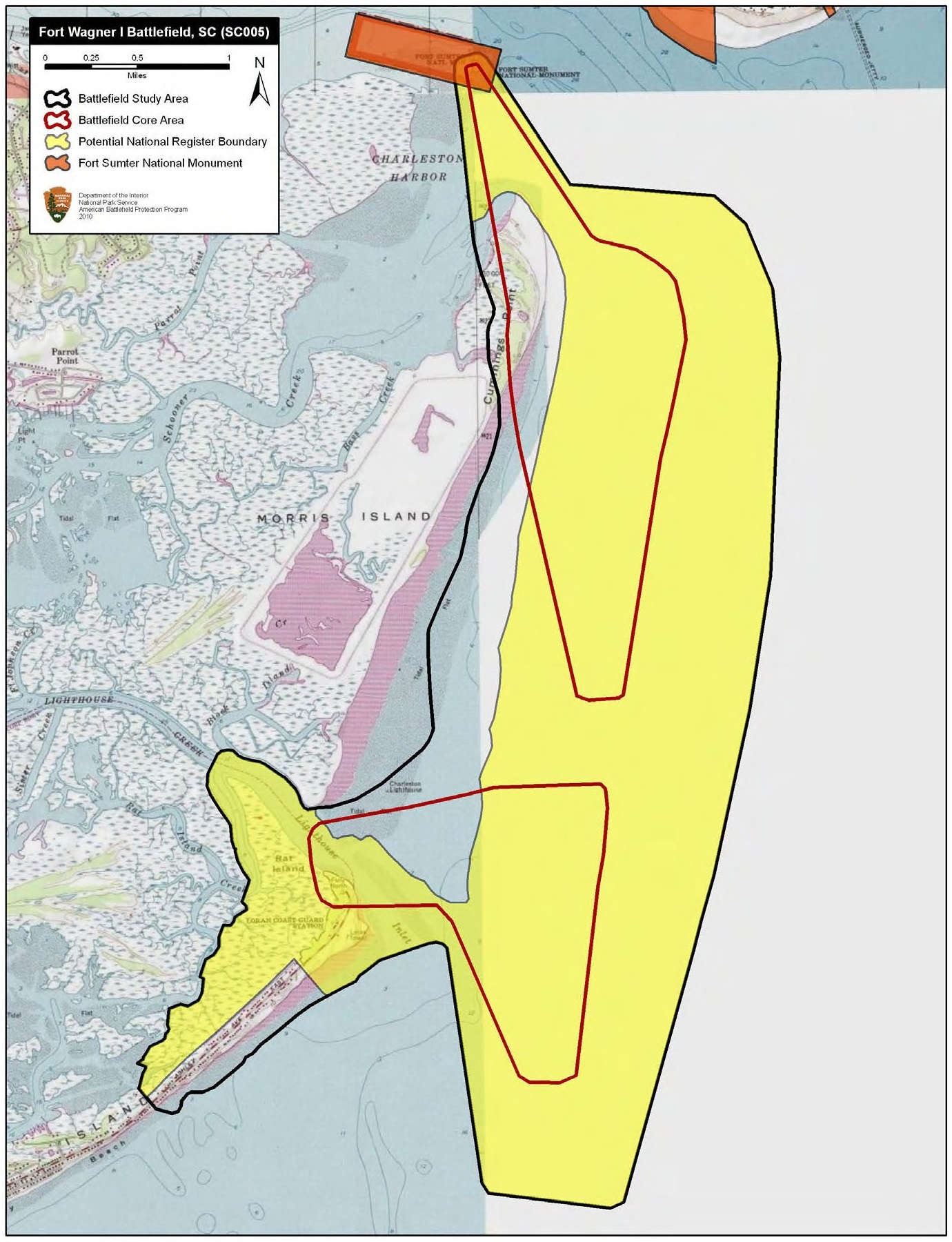
Map of Fort Wagner I Battlefield core and study areas by the American Battlefield Protection Program.

On July 10, Union shot artillery on Folly Island (which had been occupied in April 1863) and naval gunfire from Rear Admiral John A. Dahlgren's four ironclad warships bombarded the Confederate defenses protecting the southern end of Morris Island. This provided cover for the landing of Brig. Gen. George C. Strong's brigade, which crossed Lighthouse Inlet and landed at the southern tip of the island. Strong's troops advanced, capturing several batteries, moving about three miles to within range of Fort Wagner. Also known as Battery Wagner, it was a heavily gunned redoubt that covered nearly the entire width of the northern end of Morris Island, facing Sumter. Strong's report described the advance:

The two columns now moved forward, under a lively discharge of shell, grape, and canister, converging toward the works nearest the southern extremity of the island, and thence along its commanding ridge and eastern coast, capturing successively the eight batteries, of one heavy gun each, occupying the commanding points of that ridge, besides two batteries, mounting, together, three 10-inch seacoast mortars.

On July 11, Strong's brigade attacked at dawn, advancing through a thick fog, attempting to seize Fort Wagner. Although the men of the 7th Connecticut Infantry overran a line of rifle pits, they were repulsed by the 1,770-man force under Confederate Col. Robert F. Graham. Heavy artillery fire from Fort Wagner prevented other units from joining the attack.

== Aftermath ==
Union casualties were 339 (49 killed, 123 wounded, 167 missing), Confederate 12. The First Battle of Fort Wagner was followed on July 16 by assaults on James Island and on July 18 by the famous, but also unsuccessful, charge of the 54th Massachusetts Infantry on July 18 in the Second Battle of Fort Wagner.

== Battlefield preservation ==
In May 2008, TPL and partners, including the South Carolina Conservation Bank, the South Carolina State Ports Authority, the Civil War Trust, (a division of the American Battlefield Trust) and many private donors, purchased the island on behalf of the City of Charleston from Ginn Resorts for $3 million. Previously, in 2003, when a builder announced his plans to build houses on the tract, for which he had an option to buy, the Trust, local preservationist Blake Hallman and others formed the Morris Island Coalition, generated media attention and support for preservation and defeated the effort. Ginn Resorts was interested in developing the property, too, but ultimately decided to purchase it and then immediately sell it to the preservationists. According to TPL, the city and county are working "to complete a management plan to protect the island's nationally significant historical and natural resources."
