= George Crockett Strong =

Union Army general (1832–1863)

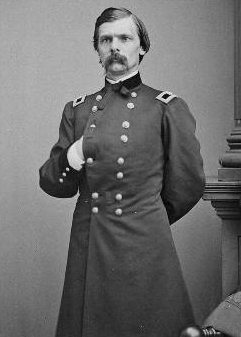
- Born: October 16, 1832; Stockbridge, Vermont, U.S.
- Died: July 30, 1863 (aged 30); New York City, New York, U.S.
- Burial place: Green-Wood Cemetery, Brooklyn, New York
- Military career
- Allegiance: United States of America; Union
- Branch: United States Army; Union Army
- Service years: 1857–1863
- Rank: Major General
- Conflicts: American Civil War; First Battle of Bull Run; Second Battle of Fort Wagner

George Crockett Strong (October 16, 1832 – July 30, 1863) was a Union brigadier general in the American Civil War.

== Biography ==
Strong was born in Stockbridge, Vermont, and attended Williston Seminary but left after 1851. Strong's ancestors all came to America from England, and they all arrived in early colonial New England as part of the Puritan migration to New England between 1620 and 1640. He attended Union College, but left for the U.S. Military Academy, from which he graduated in 1857. He served as an ordnance officer with the rank of lieutenant on the staff of General McDowell at the First Battle of Bull Run. He later served on the staffs of Generals George B. McClellan and Benjamin Butler.

"Cadet Life at West Point by an Officer of the United States Army" (Boston: T.O.H.P. Burnham, 1862), although published anonymously, is attributed to Strong.

Strong commanded an expedition sent from Ship Island against Biloxi, Mississippi, in April 1862, and another sent against Ponchatoula, and was commissioned brigadier general of volunteers in November 1862. He was wounded on July 18, 1863, while leading the assault against Fort Wagner on Morris Island, South Carolina, and died of tetanus in New York City. He posthumously received a commission as major general, dated from the day of the battle. Strong is buried in Green-Wood Cemetery in Brooklyn, New York, where there is a monument dedicated to his memory.

His name is the first listed on a monument in Easthampton, Massachusetts dedicated to those who were killed in the "Great Rebellion". Beneath his name are the names of all the other Easthampton natives who died during the Civil War. The memorial claims he graduated third in his class at West Point.

Fort Strong, a U.S. Coast Artillery fort at the northern end of Deer Island in Boston Harbor, was named after him in 1899.

== In popular culture ==
Strong was portrayed by Jay O. Sanders in the film Glory (1989).

== See also ==
- List of American Civil War generals (Union)
