= Fort Wagner =

Former fortification in South Carolina

Coordinates: 32°43′07″N 79°53′05″W

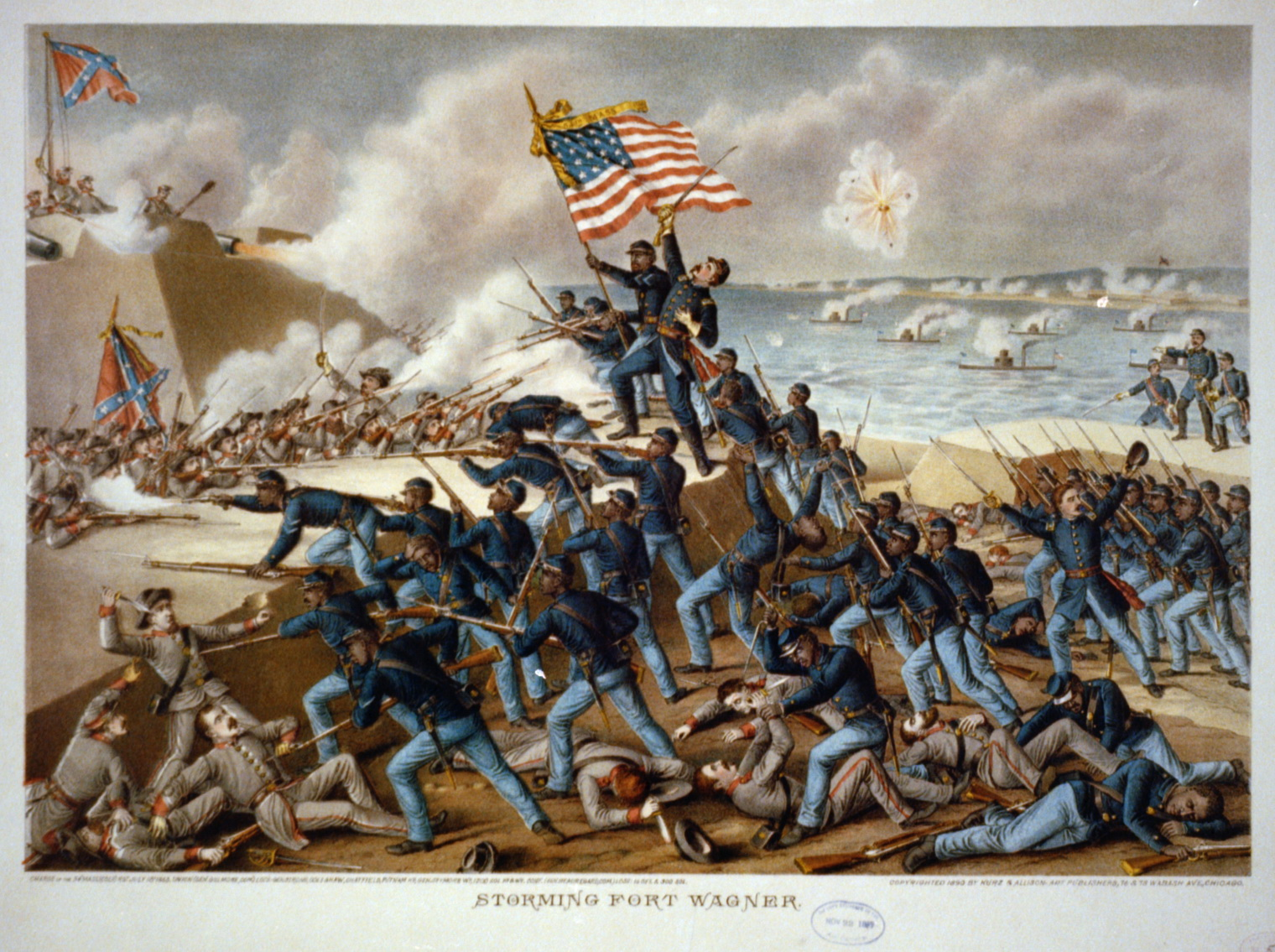
Storming Fort Wagner, an 1890 print showing U.S. soldiers of the 54. Massachusettes regiment attacking the Confederates at the fort. We see the Death of Col. Robert Goult Shaw.

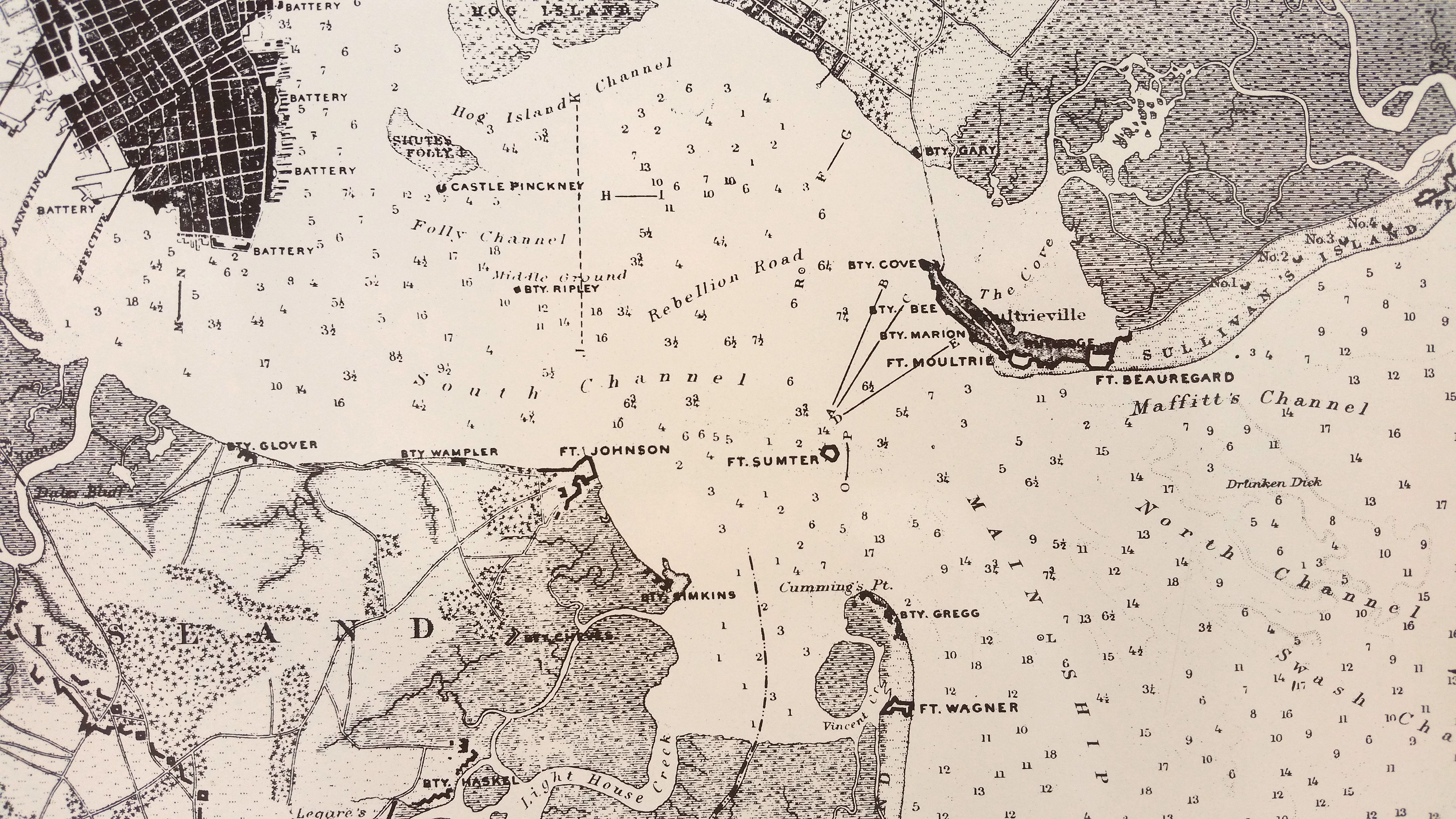
Fort Sumter National Monument marker of the Map of Charleston Harbor defenses

Fort Wagner or Battery Wagner was a beachhead fortification on Morris Island, South Carolina, that covered the southern approach to Charleston Harbor. Named for deceased Lt. Col. Thomas M. Wagner, it was the site of two American Civil War battles in the campaign known as Operations Against the Defenses of Charleston in 1863, in which United States forces took heavy casualties while trying to seize the fort. The Union Army's second assault on Fort Wagner, the Second Battle of Fort Wagner, included African American soldiers from the 54th Massachusetts Infantry Regiment and 3rd United States Colored Infantry Regiment. Josiah T. Walls, who went on to become a United States Congressman from Florida, was one of the soldiers.

== Construction ==
Fort Wagner measured 250 yards (230 m) by 100 yards (91 m), and spanned an area between the Atlantic on the east and an impassable swamp on the west. Its walls, composed of sand and earth, rose 30 feet (9.1 m) above the level beach and were supported by palmetto logs and sandbags. The fort's arsenal included fourteen cannons, the largest a 10-inch (250 mm) Columbiad that fired a 128-pound shell. It was a large structure capable of sheltering nearly 1,000 of the fort's 1,700-man garrison and provided substantial protection against naval shelling. The fort's land face was protected by a water-filled trench, 10 feet (3.0 m) wide and 5 feet (1.5 m) deep, surrounded by buried land mines and sharpened palmetto stakes. The fort itself was supported by defenses throughout Morris Island.

== History ==
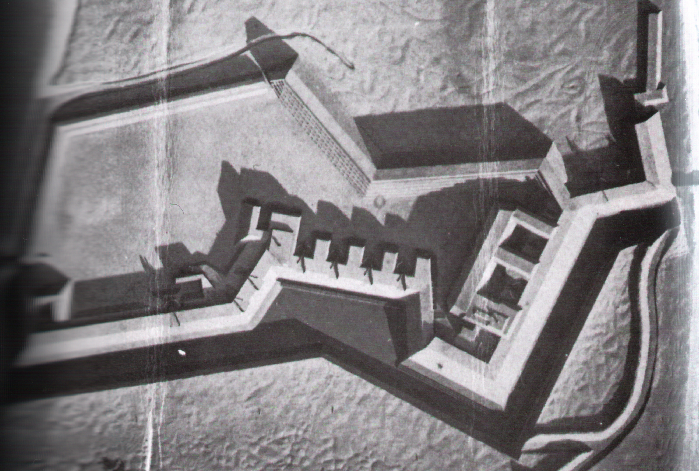
Model of Fort Wagner

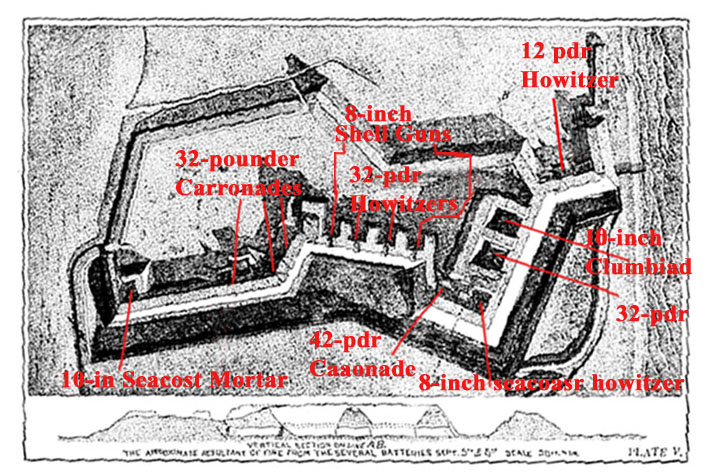
Plan of Fort Wagner, with overlay showing armament

The First Battle of Fort Wagner, occurred on July 11, 1863. Only 12 Confederate soldiers were killed, as opposed to 339 losses for the U.S. side.

The Second Battle of Fort Wagner, a week later, is better known. It was the Union attack on July 18, 1863, led by the 54th Massachusetts Volunteer Infantry, one of the first major American military units made up of black soldiers. Colonel Robert Gould Shaw led the 54th Massachusetts on foot while they charged, and was killed in the assault.

Although a tactical defeat, the publicity of the battle of Fort Wagner led to further action for black U.S. troops in the Civil War, and it spurred additional recruitment that gave the Union Army a further numerical advantage in troops over the South.

Union forces besieged the fort after the unsuccessful assault. By August 25, Union entrenchments were close enough to attempt an assault on the Advanced Rifle Pits, 240 yards in front of the Battery, but the attempt was defeated. A second attempt, by the 24th Massachusetts Infantry, on August 26 was successful. After enduring almost 60 days of heavy U.S. shelling, the Confederates abandoned it on the night of September 6–7, 1863, withdrawing all operable cannons and the garrison.

The main reason the fort was abandoned was a concern about the loss of the garrison due to artillery fire and the threat of imminent assault. On September 6, the garrison commander, Colonel Keitt, wrote to his superiors,

"The garrison must be taken away immediately after dark, or it will be destroyed or captured. It is idle to deny that the heavy Parrott shells have breached the walls and are knocking away the bomb-proofs. Pray have boats immediately after dark at Cummings Point to take away the men. I say deliberately that this must be done or the garrison will be sacrificed. I am sending the wounded and sick now to Cummings Point, and will continue to do so, if possible, until all are gone. I have a number of them now there. I have not in the garrison 400 effective men, including artillery. The engineers agree in opinion with me, or, rather, shape my opinion. I shall say no more."

A council of war in Charleston on the 4th had already reached the same conclusion, and the evacuation was carried out as planned.

The fall of Battery Wagner had considerable strategic significance. With its loss and that of Fort Gregg, Morris Island fell to the US. Although Charleston remained in the hands of the rebels its port was effectively closed. At the end of the year, Secretary of the Navy Gideon Welles could report that "the commerce of Charleston has ceased." The impact also showed directly in rebel customs receipts, which fell drastically from 1863 to 1864. The labors and sacrifices of the US forces during the storms and siege had in the end shut down a vital lifeline to the rebellion.

== 54th Massachusetts ==
The best-known regiment that fought for the Union in the battle of Fort Wagner was the 54th Massachusetts, which was one of the first African-American regiments in the war. The 54th was controversial in the North, where many people supported the abolition of slavery but still treated African Americans as lesser or inferior to whites. Though some claimed blacks could not fight as well as whites, the actions of the 54th Massachusetts demonstrated once again the fallacy in that argument, as this was not the first time blacks ever fought in war or even for the United States.

William Carney, an African American and a sergeant with the 54th, is considered the first black recipient of the Medal of Honor for his actions at Fort Wagner in recovering and returning the unit's American flag to Union lines. After the battle, the Confederates buried the regiment's commanding officer, Colonel Shaw, in an unmarked mass grave with the African-American soldiers of his regiment as an insult to him. Instead, his family considered it an honor that Shaw was buried with his men.

Morris Island is smaller than 1,000 acres and is subject to extensive erosion by storm and sea. Much of the site of Fort Wagner has been eroded away, including the place where the Union soldiers were buried. However, by the time that happened, the soldiers' remains were no longer there because soon after the end of the Civil War, the Army disinterred and reburied all the remains, including presumably those of Shaw, at the Beaufort National Cemetery in Beaufort, South Carolina, where their gravestones were marked as "unknown". The number missing presumed dead at Battery Wagner was 391, among the 10 regiments involved. 54th with the most at 146. 100 NY with 119, 48th NY with 112. The number of unknowns at Beaufort on their Civil War Monument 1870s is 174 unknowns. These unknowns collected from three Southern states. Sites include East Florida, Millen and Lawton, Georgia and Hilton Head, South Carolina. Two Confederate POW sites are included. Given the missing at Morris Island is more than double the total unknowns at Beaufort National Cemetery, it appears many bodies were not removed and were lost to the shifting sea and sands.

== In popular culture ==
The fort is an important setting in the 1989 film Glory. The final scene portrays Shaw and the men of the 54th Massachusetts leading the attack and storming the fort unsuccessfully.

In the 2017 book Magnus Chase and the Ship of the Dead, a character named T.J. dies charging the battlements at Fort Wagner.

== Preservation ==
Within twenty years of the Civil War, the remnants of the fort had been washed away by erosion on Morris Island. A group of three ex-servicemen traveled to the fort in May 1885 and reported that the entire fort and approaches to it had washed away into the ocean.

Although the Atlantic Ocean consumed Fort Wagner and the original site is now offshore, the Civil War Trust (a division of the American Battlefield Trust) and its partners have acquired and preserved 118 acres (0.48 km^{2}) of historic Morris Island, which had gun emplacements and other military installations during the war.
