= Daniel Ammen =

United States Navy admiral (1820–1898)

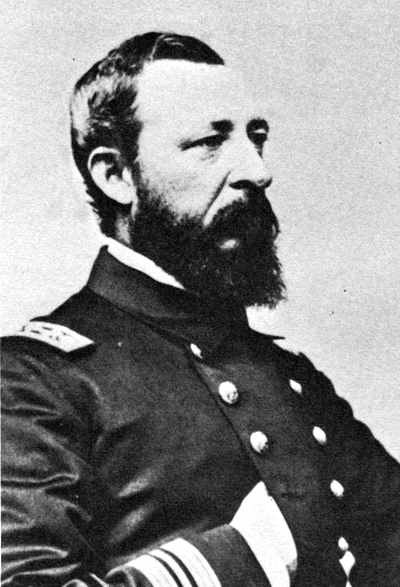
- Born: May 15, 1820; Brown County, Ohio, US
- Died: July 11, 1898 (aged 78); Washington, D.C., US
- Burial place: Arlington National Cemetery
- Relatives: BG Jacob Ammen
- Military career
- Allegiance: United States of America
- Branch: United States Navy
- Service years: 1836–1878
- Rank: Rear Admiral
- Commands: Bureau of Navigation; Bureau of Yards and Docks; USS Piscataqua; USS Miantonomoh; USS Mohican; USS Shenandoah (Interim); USS Patapsco; USS Sebago; USS Seneca
- Conflicts: American Civil War: Battle of Port Royal; Battle of Fort McAllister (1863); Second Battle of Fort Sumter; First Battle of Fort Fisher; Second Battle of Fort Fisher
- Other work: Author

Daniel Ammen (May 15, 1820 – July 11, 1898) was a U.S. naval officer during the American Civil War and the Reconstruction era, as well as a prolific author. His last assignment in the Navy was Chief of the Bureau of Navigation.

== Early career ==
Daniel Ammen was born on May 15, 1820, in Brown County, Ohio, the son of David and Sarah Ammen. His father served in the War of 1812 and migrated to Ohio from Virginia. His older brother was Jacob Ammen, who became a brigadier general in the Union Army. They both attended the same school as Ulysses S. Grant, who was best friends with Daniel. As children, Ammen rescued Grant from drowning.

Ammen entered the Navy as a midshipman on 7 July 1836 and following the basic training, he was attached to the newly commissioned supply ship USS Relief, which was preparing for the Wilkes Exploring Expedition to Antarctica. Before he could depart for South Ocean, he was transferred to the frigate USS Macedonian in July 1837 and then transferred to USS Levant in March 1838. Ammen sailed for West Indies and while there, he was transferred to USS Vandalia.

In March 1840, Ammen was attached to USS Preble and took part in a cruise along the coast of Labrador, the Preble sailed for the Mediterranean Sea in January 1841 to join the squadron of Commodore Charles W. Morgan. In May that year he was transferred to the USS Ohio, in which he returned to Boston, Massachusetts, in July 1841.

He was subsequently ordered to the Naval School at Philadelphia (predecessor of the United States Naval Academy) and following the study during the winter of 1841–42, Ammen was promoted to passed midshipman on July 1, 1842. He then served at the schooner USS Experiment, which was used as the receiving ship at Philadelphia Navy Yard. Ammen joined the crew of frigate USS Savannah and took part in the several patrol cruises in the Pacific Ocean.

In October 1843, Ammen was transferred to the sloop USS Lexington and made several trips to the Mediterranean Sea to deliver supplies. He was attached to the USS Vincennes in April 1845 and took part in the cruise to the East Indies. Following his promotion to the rank of Master (equivalent of present rank of Lieutenant (junior grade), Ammen was granted three-month leave with permission to visit Europe and then join the Mediterranean Squadron under Commodore Charles W. Morgan, whose Ammen knew from his previous assignment in 1841.

Morgan promoted Ammen to lieutenant on November 4, 1849, and appointed him Commanding officer of frigate USS St. Lawrence. Ammen commanded the ship in the Mediterranean during the crisis caused by First Schleswig War and returned to the United States with that vessel in November 1850.

Following a tour of coast survey duty, Ammen was ordered to the gunboat USS Water Witch under command of Lieutenant Thomas J. Page and sailed for South America for expedition to explore the Río de la Plata Basin. He then joined the crew of brig USS Bainbridge in May 1854 and participated in the patrol cruises with the Brazil Squadron until January 1855.

He then served at the Naval Observatory in Washington, D.C., until August 1857 and then joined USS Saranac which patrolled Pacific Ocean areas. Ammen was transferred to the Flagship of the Pacific Squadron, USS Merrimack and served under Commodore John C. Long until ship's return to the United States in February 1860. He was then stationed at the Naval Facility in Baltimore, Maryland, until the outbreak of the American Civil War in April 1861.

== American Civil War ==
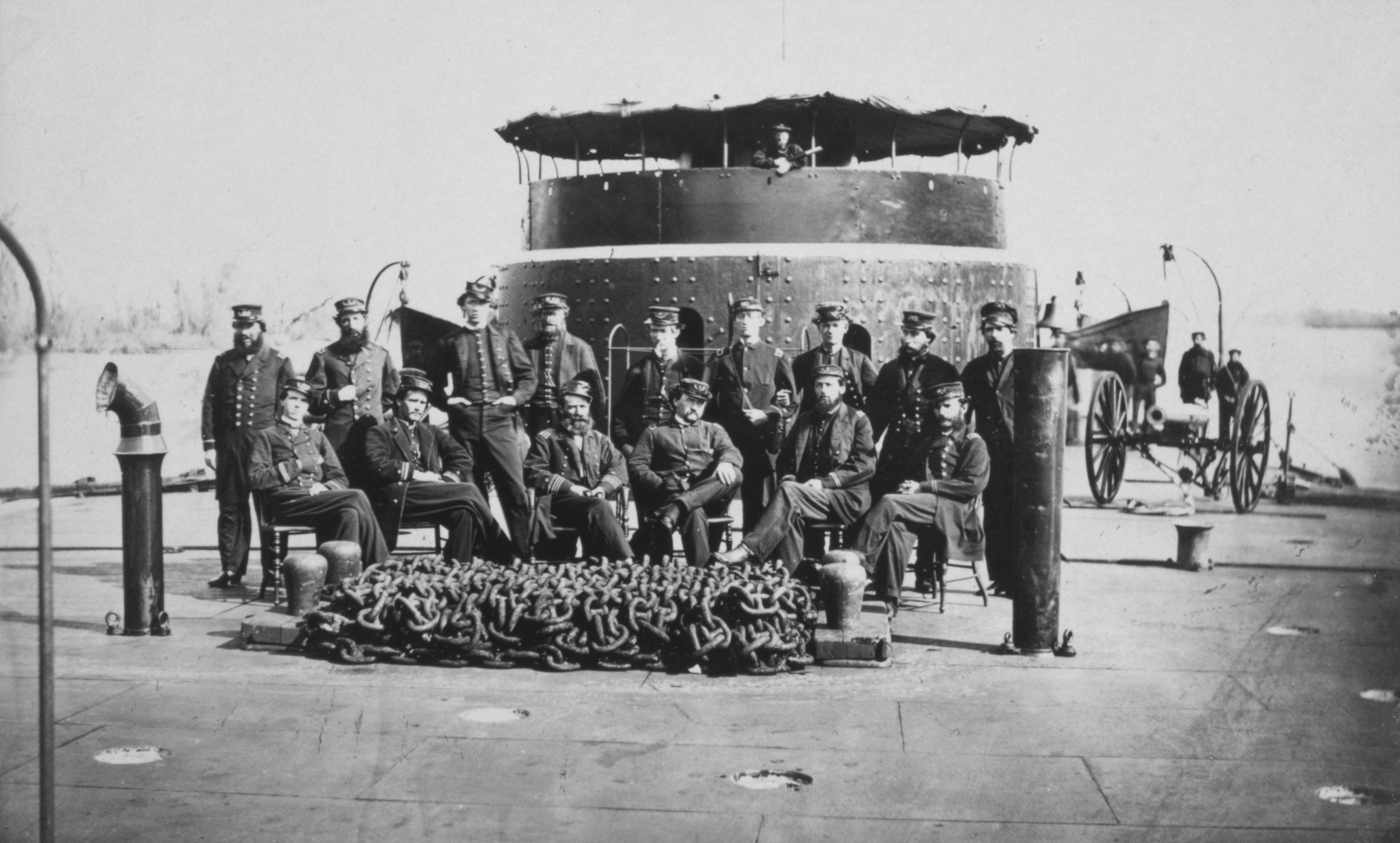
Officers of a Union monitor, probably USS Patapsco, photographed during the American Civil War

One month following the outbreak of the War, Ammen was attached to the frigate USS Roanoke and immediately embarked for the Union blockade. He was aboard, when Roanoke destroyed the Confederate schooner Mary off Lockwood Folly Inlet, North Carolina, in July 1861. Ammen was appointed commanding officer of newly commissioned gunboat USS Seneca in September that year and took part in the South Atlantic Blockading Squadron.

Ammen then participated in the Battle of Port Royal on November 7, 1861, and was commended for bravery, when he went ashore to hoist the flag over the surrendered forts, and hold them till the army took possession. He then took part in the actions on the Wilmington River at the end of January 1862 and participated in the capture of several Confederate vessels and the town of Fernandina, Florida.

Upon his promotion to commander on July 16, 1862, Ammen assumed command of the gunboat USS Sebago, which he commanded only for a brief period. He was ordered to Washington, D.C., in October 1862 and joined the monitor USS Patapsco, which was just launched. The Patapsco was commissioned in January 1863, and Ammen joined with her the South Atlantic Blockading Squadron.

He took part in the Naval bombardment of Fort McAllister between January–March 1863 and although Union ships did not capture the fort, commanding admiral Samuel F. Du Pont had the opportunity to test ship's new guns. Ammen was relieved due to illness in June that year and was on sick leave until September. He was subsequently attached to the staff of the South Atlantic Blockading Squadron under Rear Admiral John A. Dahlgren and served as Dahlgren's aide aboard the USS Philadelphia. Ammen took part in the Second Battle of Fort Sumter in September 1863.

Ammen became ill again in January 1864 and spent two months with treatment. He then assumed temporary command of the USS Shenandoah in March that year and served with the North Atlantic Blockading Squadron for one month, before he was appointed officer-in-charge of Marine recruits aboard the merchant vessel SS Ocean Queen in May 1864. His main task was to transport approximately 220 Naval recruits from Aspinwall, Pennsylvania, to New York City. There was also about 500 passengers aboard that vessel.

The recruits were recently transferred from the Army to the Navy as replacements, and shortly after the departure from Aspinwall, approximately 30 recruits began planning the plot to seize the ship. They intended to kill everyone who should oppose them, and the conspiracy included the running of the vessel, after her seizure, on their own account. The mutineers attacked Captain Tinklepaugh, but he refused to comply and called for Commander Ammen.

Captain Tinklepaugh, who had expected the difficulty and was prepared, aimed his revolver at the head of the one of mutineers' leaders, and warned him that if he advanced a step further he would lose his life. Mutineer sprang forward and Tinklepaugh killed him instantly, Ammen subsequently pulled out his revolver and shot another one, who tried to attack him. The rest of the mutineers then surrendered and Ammen ordered to put them all to the handcuffs.

In October 1864, Ammen was appointed commander of the USS Mohican and commanded Mohican during the attacks on Fort Fisher in December 1864 and January 1865.

== Postwar service ==
Following the War, Ammen was assigned to the Naval Machinery at Charlotte, North Carolina, in July 1865 and remained there until September that year, when he was appointed commanding officer of the monitor USS Miantonomoh. He served with that vessel within the North Atlantic Squadron until March 1866, when he was detached for special duty in Hartford, Connecticut. While there, Ammen was promoted to the rank of captain on July 25, 1866.

He was appointed commanding officer of a newly commissioned screw steamer USS Piscataqua at Portsmouth Navy Yard and served within the Asiatic Station until February 1869. During his service there, Ammen's vessel served as Flagship to Commanding admiral, Stephen C. Rowan.

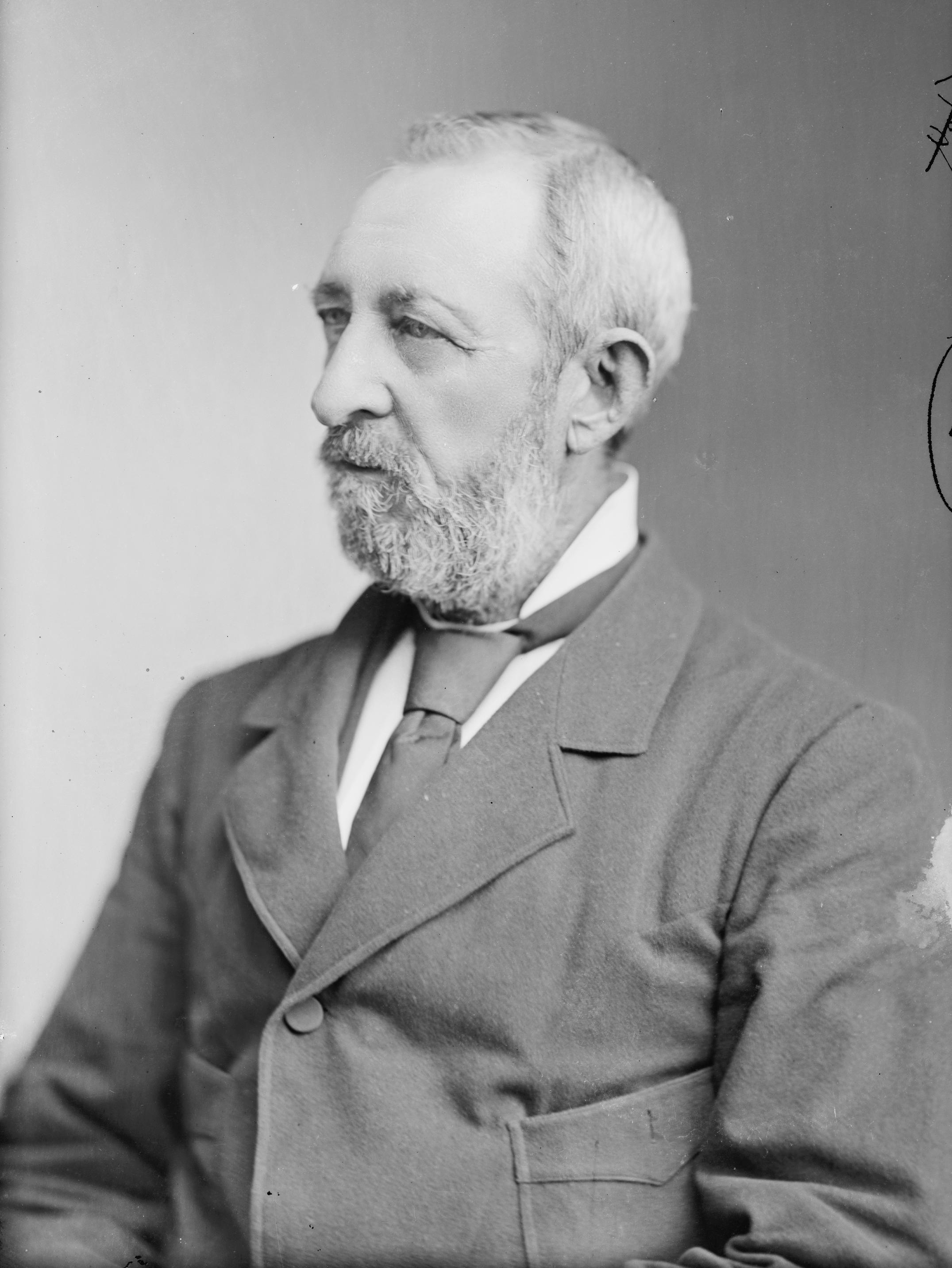
Ammen following his retirement from the Navy

Following his return stateside and leave with family, Ammen was appointed chief of the Bureau of Yards and Docks in May 1869. He was responsible for building and maintaining navy yards, drydocks, and other facilities relating to ship construction, maintenance, and repair until August 1871.

He was subsequently appointed chief of the Bureau of Navigation and promoted to commodore on April 1, 1872. While in this assignment, his principal responsibilities were to provide nautical charts and instruments and to oversee several activities involved navigation research, including the Naval Observatory. In 1872 he was appointed member of a commission to examine and report on the feasibility of constructing a canal through Nicaragua. The commission reported in favour of the Nicaraguan route, which he strongly advocated. He was promoted to rear admiral on December 11, 1877. Ammen served with the Bureau of Navigation until his retirement from the Navy on June 4, 1878.

== Retirement ==
Two years later, he wrote The American Inter-Oceanic Ship Canal Question. Afterwards he was a member of the board to locate the new Naval Observatory, and a representative of the United States at the Interoceanic Ship Canal Congress in Paris. He designed a cask balsa to facilitate the landing of troops and field artillery, a life-raft for steamers, and the steel ram USS Katahdin in 1893.

After retirement, Ammen lived in Beltsville, Maryland. He later purchased a farm twelve miles from Washington, D.C., at Ammendale, a station named in his honor. The Ammendale Normal Institute was built there with his support in 1880.

His publications include The Atlantic Coast in The Navy in the Civil War Series; Recollections of Grant; and The Old Navy and the New.

He died on July 11, 1898, at the Naval Hospital in Washington, D.C., and was buried at Arlington National Cemetery. Ammen was married and had one son, Ulysses Grant Ammen (1871–1913), who served as Paymaster in the Navy.

== Namesake ==
Two ships in the United States Navy have been named USS Ammen for him.
