= Charles Belknap =

Charles Belknap may refer to:

- Charles E. Belknap (1846–1929), politician from the U.S. state of Michigan
- Charles Belknap Jr. (1880–1954), United States Navy officer
- Charles Henry Belknap (1841–1926), Justice of the Nevada Supreme Court
