= USS Ammen =

Two ships of the United States Navy have been named Ammen for Daniel Ammen.

- USS Ammen (DD-35), was a Paulding-class destroyer launched in 1910 and served in World War I.
- USS Ammen (DD-527), was a Fletcher-class destroyer launched in 1942, served in World War II and decommissioned in 1960.
