= John G. Sproston =

American naval officer (1828–1862)

John Glendy Sproston (14 August 1828 – 8 June 1862) was an officer in the United States Navy during the American Civil War. He was killed in action in a riverine action in Florida.

== Biography ==
John G. Sproston was born in Maryland. He was the eldest son of George Saxon Sproston, a U.S. naval surgeon, and Jane Glendy, a daughter of the Rev John Glendy, former Chaplain of the United States Senate. He was appointed to the Naval Academy in 1846. He subsequently served with the Pacific Squadron during the war with Mexico. In 1854, Sproston voyaged to Japan with the Perry (Matthew Calbraith Perry) Expedition.

During the Civil War, he served as commanding officer of Powhatan and as executive officer of Seneca. On 1 November 1861, during the Battle of Port Royal, Sproston personally fired many of the 11-inch guns on board Seneca as the crew was new and untrained. Sproston was killed by George Huston on 8 June 1862, while on a boat expedition to destroy a Confederate privateer near Black Creek on St. Johns River in Florida.

Sproston lived on West Fayette Street in Baltimore. He died on He was buried in Green Mount Cemetery in Baltimore.

== Namesakes ==
USS Sproston (DD-173) and USS Sproston (DD-577) were named for him.
