= Second Battle of Fort Sumter =

September 1863, American Civil War

Coordinates: 32.7524°N 79.8749°W

- Part of the American Civil War
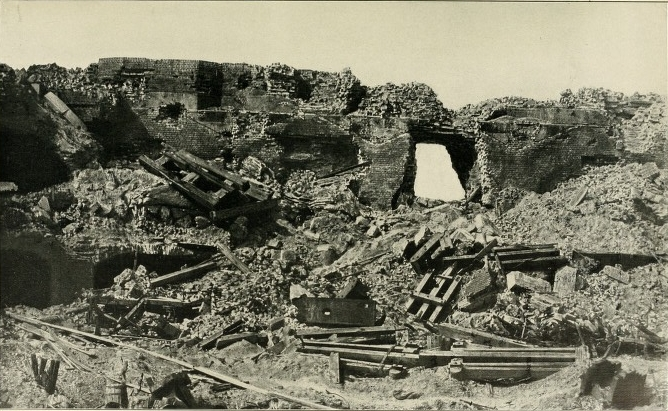
- Photograph taken September 8, 1863, shows the breach compromised at Fort Sumter's wall facing Morris Island during the bombardment of Fort Sumter. The naval party attempted to enter the fort here.
Date	September 7, 1863 – September 8, 1863
Location	Charleston Harbor, South Carolina
Result	Confederate victory

Belligerents
United States	(Confederate States of America) Confederate States

Commanders and leaders
Quincy Gillmore	P. G. T. Beauregard

Units involved
U.S. Marine Corps	

Strength
413	320

Casualties and losses
117	9

The Second Battle of Fort Sumter was fought on September 8, 1863, in Charleston Harbor. Confederate General P. G. T. Beauregard, who had commanded the defenses of Charleston and captured Fort Sumter in the first battle of the war, was in overall command of the defenders. In the battle, Union forces under Major General Quincy Gillmore attempted to retake the fort at the mouth of the harbor. Union gunners pummeled the fort from their batteries on Morris Island. After a severe bombing of the fort, Beauregard, suspecting an attack, replaced the artillerymen and all but one of the fort's guns with 320 infantrymen, who repulsed the naval landing party. Gillmore had reduced Fort Sumter to a pile of rubble, but the Confederate flag still waved over the ruins.

== Background ==
Union efforts to retake Charleston Harbor began on April 7, 1863, when Rear Admiral Samuel Francis Du Pont, commander of the South Atlantic Blockading Squadron, led the ironclad frigate New Ironsides, the tower ironclad Keokuk, and the monitors Weehawken, Pasaic, Montauk, Patapsco, Nantucket, Catskill, and Nahant in an attack on the harbor's defenses (The 1863 Battle of Fort Sumter was the largest deployment of monitors in action up to that time). The attack was unsuccessful, the Union's best ship, USS New Ironsides never effectively engaged, and the ironclads fired only 154 rounds, while receiving 2,209 from the Confederate defenders. Due to damage received in the attack, the USS Keokuk sank the next day, 1,400 yards (1,300 m) off the southern tip of Morris Island. Over the next month, working at night to avoid the attention of the Federal squadron, the Confederates salvaged Keokuk's two eleven-inch Dahlgren guns. One of the Dahlgren guns was promptly placed in Fort Sumter.

The Confederates, in the meantime, were strengthening Fort Sumter. A workforce of just under 500 slaves, under the supervision of Confederate army engineers, were filling casemates with sand, protecting the gorge wall with sandbags, and building new traverse, blindages, and bombproofs. Some of Fort Sumter's artillery had been removed, but 40 pieces still were mounted. Fort Sumter's heaviest guns were mounted on the barbette, the fort's highest level, where they had wide angles of fire and could fire down on approaching ships. The barbette was also more exposed to enemy gunfire than the casemates in the two lower levels of the fort.

A special military decoration, known as the Gillmore Medal, was later issued to all Union service members who had performed duty at Fort Sumter under the command of Major-General Quincy Adams Gillmore

Fort Sumter Armaments, August 17, 1863'
Location	Armament
Left flank barbette	Two 10-inch (250 mm) columbiads
Left face barbette	Two 10-inch (250 mm) columbiads, two 8-inch (200 mm) columbiads, four 42-pounders
Left face, first tier casemates	Two 8-inch (200 mm) shell guns
Right face barbette	Two 10-inch (250 mm) columbiads, five rifled and banded 42-pounders
Right face, first tier casemates	Two 32-pounders
Right flank barbette	One XI-inch Dahlgren (From USS Keokuk), four 10-inch (250 mm) columbiads, one 8-inch (200 mm) Columbiad, one rifled 42-pounder, one 8-inch (200 mm) Brooke
Gorge barbette	Five rifled and banded 42-pounders, one 24-pounder
Salient, second tier casemates	Three rifled and banded 42-pounders
Parade	Two 10-inch (250 mm) seacoast mortars

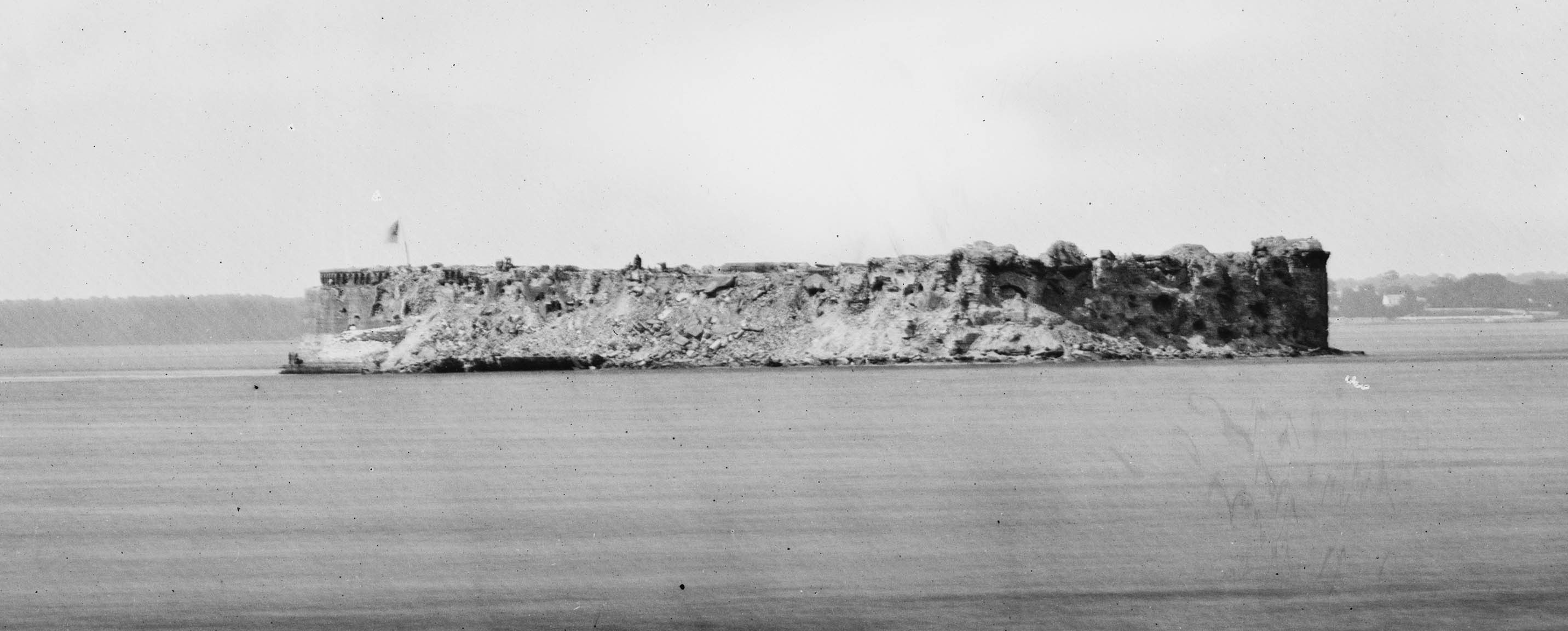
View of Confederate-held Fort Sumter, August 23, 1863.

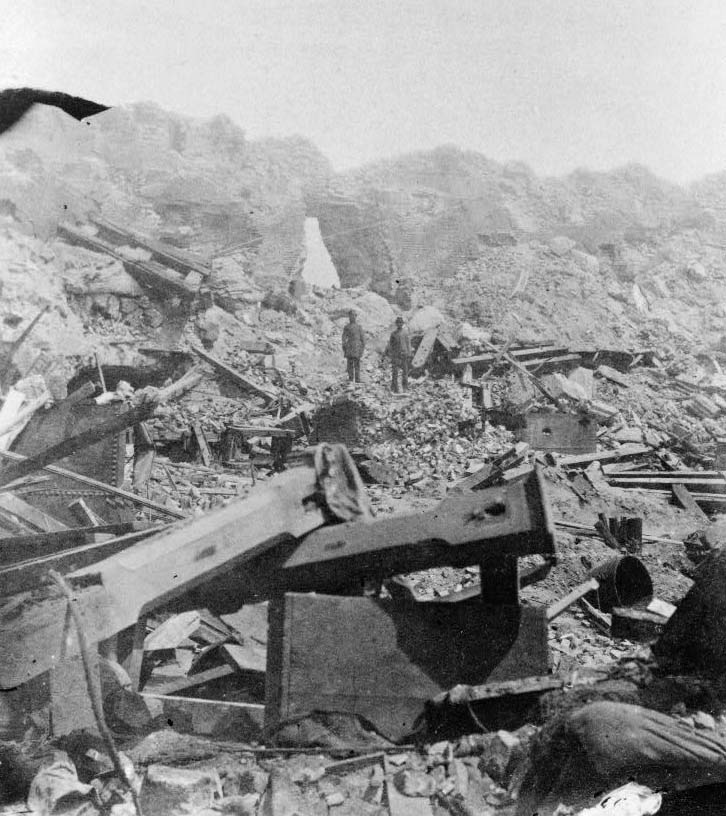
Interior View of Fort Sumter, taken by a Confederate photographer, 1864.

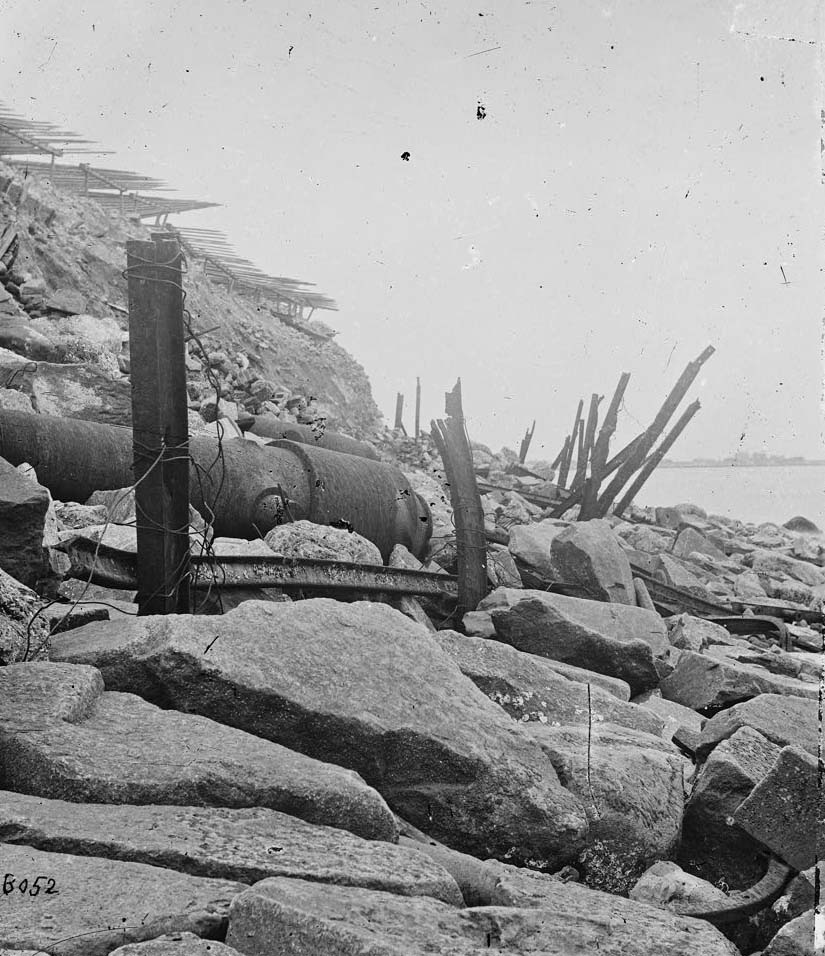
Exterior view of Fort Sumter, 1865. Banded rifle in foreground, fraise at top.

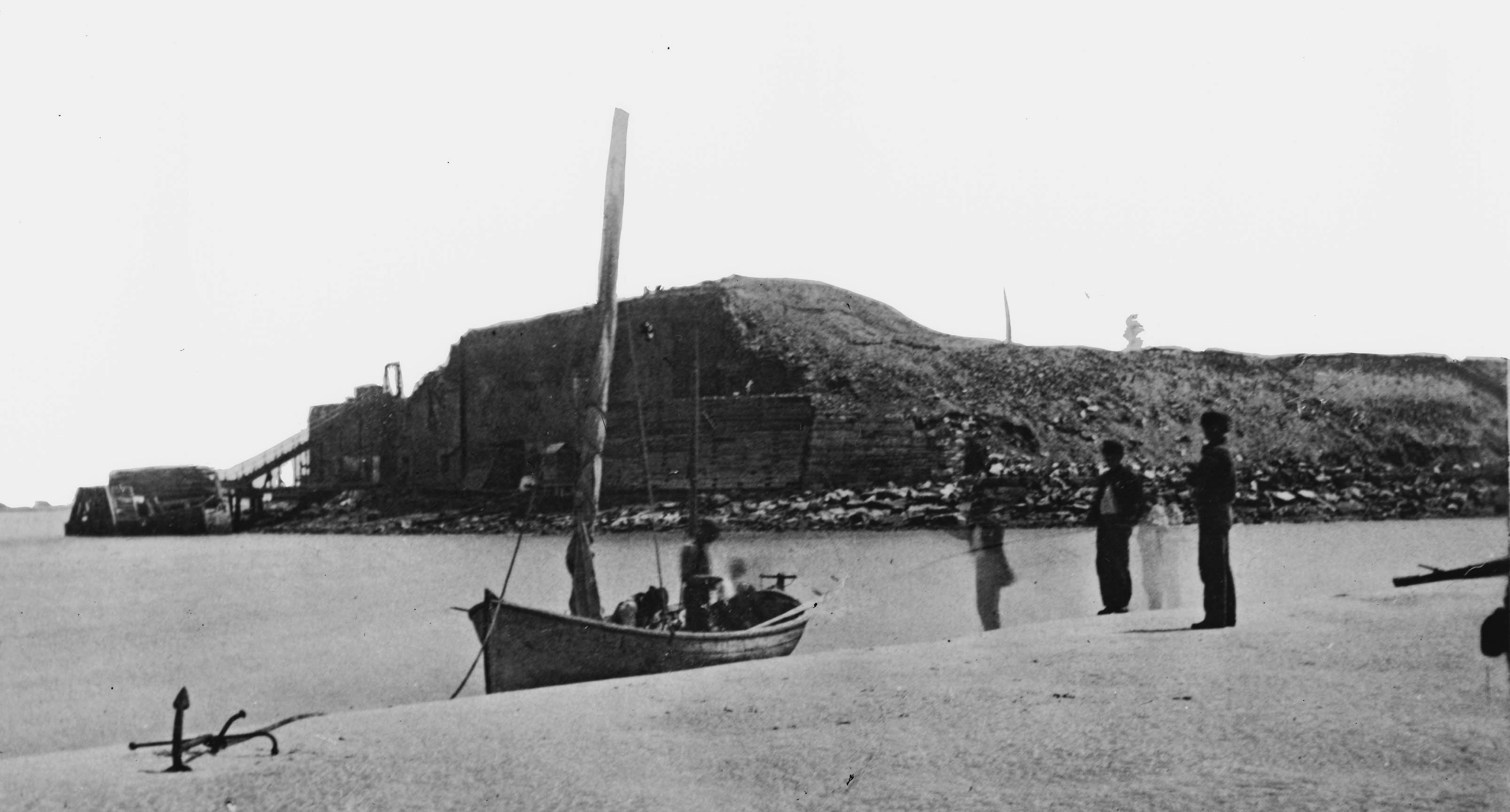
View of Fort Sumter from the sandbar, 1865.

== Battle ==
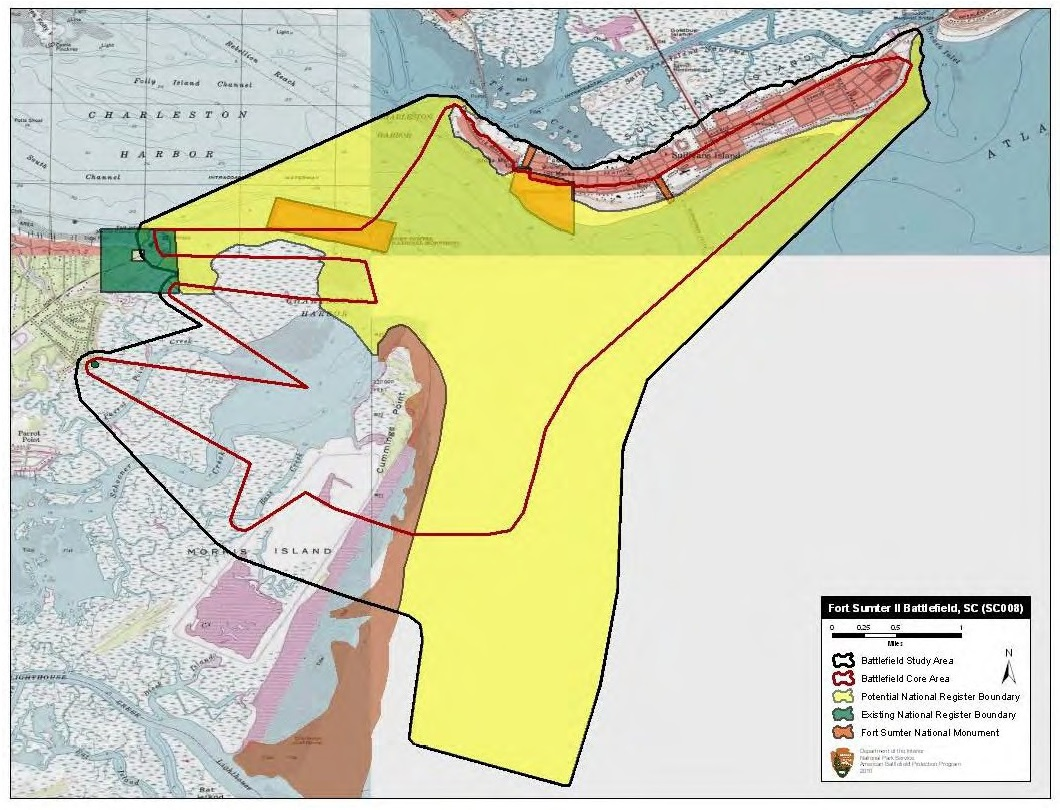
Map of Fort Sumter II Battlefield core and study areas by the American Battlefield Protection Program.

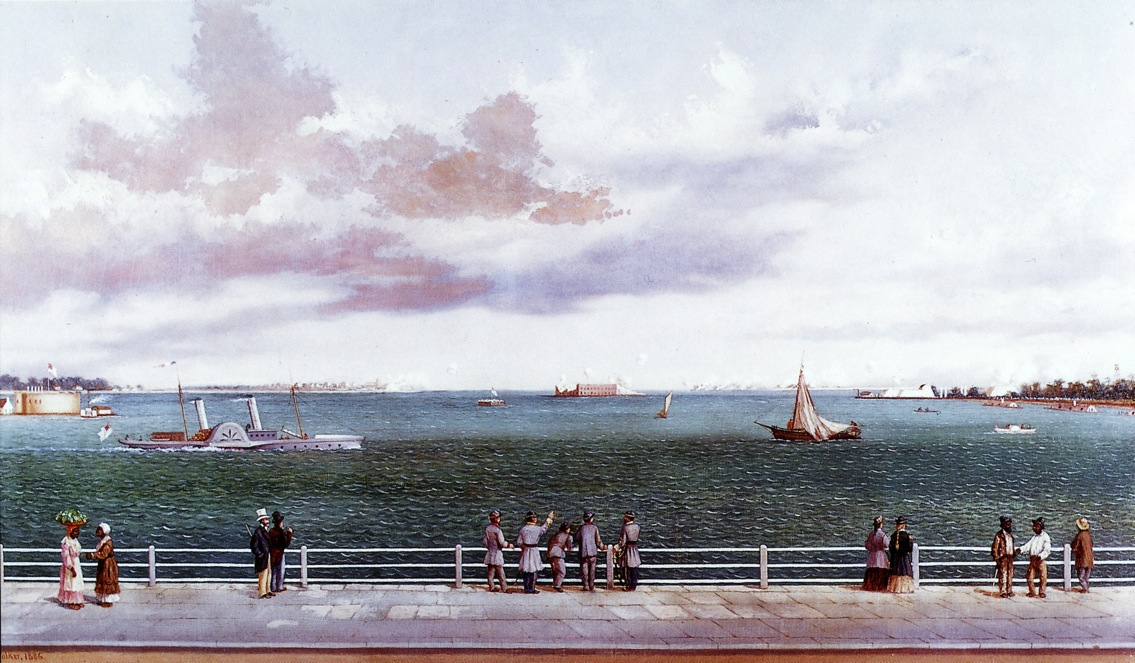
Bombardment of Fort Sumter, Charleston Harbor, Charleston, South Carolina, 1863, William Aiken Walker, 1886, Gibbes Museum of Art

After the devastating bombardment, both Major General Quincy A. Gillmore and Rear Admiral John A. Dahlgren, now commanding the South Atlantic Blockading Squadron, determined to launch a boat assault on Fort Sumter for the night of September 8–9, 1863. Cooperation between the Army and Navy was poor. Dahlgren refused to place his sailors and marines under the command of an army officer, so two flotillas set out towards Fort Sumter that night. The army flotilla was detained off Morris Island by the low tide. By the time they could proceed, the navy assault had already been defeated and the army flotilla returned to shore.

The navy's assault involved 400 sailors and marines in 25 boats. The operation was a fiasco from beginning to end. Poor reconnaissance, planning and communication all characterized the operation. Commander Thomas H. Stevens, Jr., commanding the monitor Patapsco, was placed in charge of the assault. When Commander Stevens protested that he "knew nothing of [the assault's] organization " and "made some remonstrances on this grounds and others." Dahlgren replied "There is nothing but a corporal's guard [about 6–10 men] in the fort, and all we have to do is go and take possession." This underestimation of the Confederate forces on Dahlgren's part may explain why he was hostile to a joint operation wishing to reserve the credit for the victory to the navy. Fewer than half of the boats landed. Most of the boats that did land landed on the right flank or right gorge angle, rather than on the gorge where there was a passable breach. The Union sailors and marines who did land could not scale the wall. The Confederates fired upon the landing party as well as throwing hand grenades and loose bricks. The men in the boats that had not landed fired muskets and revolvers blindly at the fort, endangering the landing party more than the garrison. The landing party took shelter in shell holes in the wall of the fort. In response to a signal rocket fired by the garrison, Fort Johnson and the Confederate warship CSS Chicora opened fire upon the boats and landing party. The boats that could withdraw withdrew, and the landing party surrendered. The Union casualties were 8 killed, 19 wounded, and 105 captured (including 15 of the wounded). The Confederates did not suffer any casualties in the assault.

== Aftermath ==
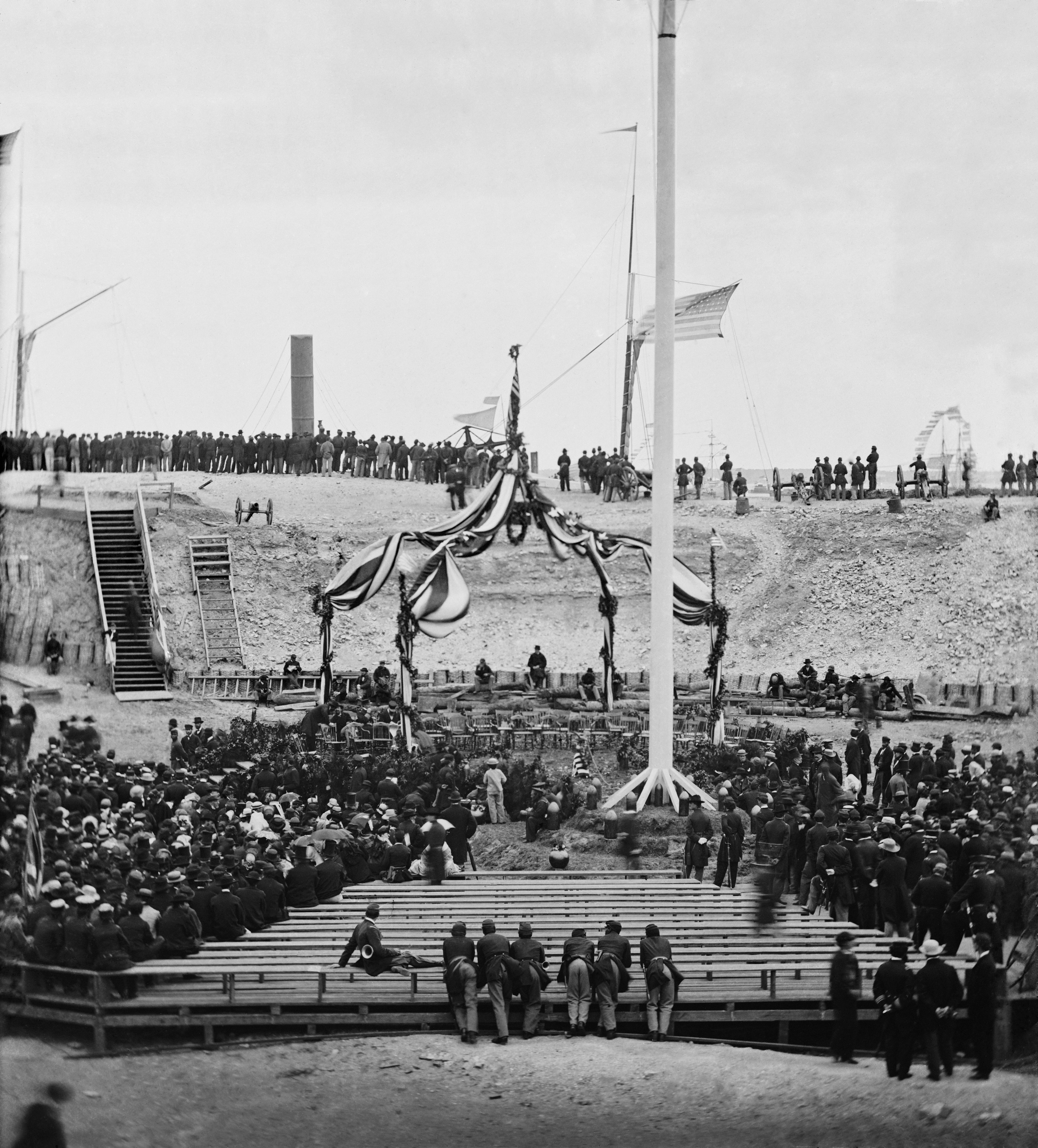
Flag-raising over Fort Sumter, April 14, 1865

After the unsuccessful boat assault, the bombardment recommenced and proceeded with varying degree of intensity, doing more damage to Fort Sumter until the end of the war. The garrison continued to suffer casualties. The Confederates continued to salvage guns and other material from the ruins and harassed the Union batteries on Morris Island with sharpshooters. The Confederates mounted four 10-inch (250 mm) columbiads, one 8-inch (200 mm) columbiad rifled, and two rifled 42-pounders, in the left face, bottom tier casemates. The last Confederate commander, Major Thomas A. Huguenin, a graduate from The Citadel, The Military College of South Carolina, never surrendered Fort Sumter, but General William T. Sherman's advance through South Carolina finally forced the Confederates to evacuate Charleston on February 17, 1865, and abandon Fort Sumter. The Federal government formally took possession of Fort Sumter on February 22, 1865, with a flag-raising ceremony. One Union soldier was killed and another Union soldier was mortally wounded during the surrender ceremony. Fifty-two Confederate soldiers were killed there during the remainder of the war. While a number of slaves were killed while working at the fort, the exact number is unknown.
