= USS Katahdin (1893) =

American naval ship

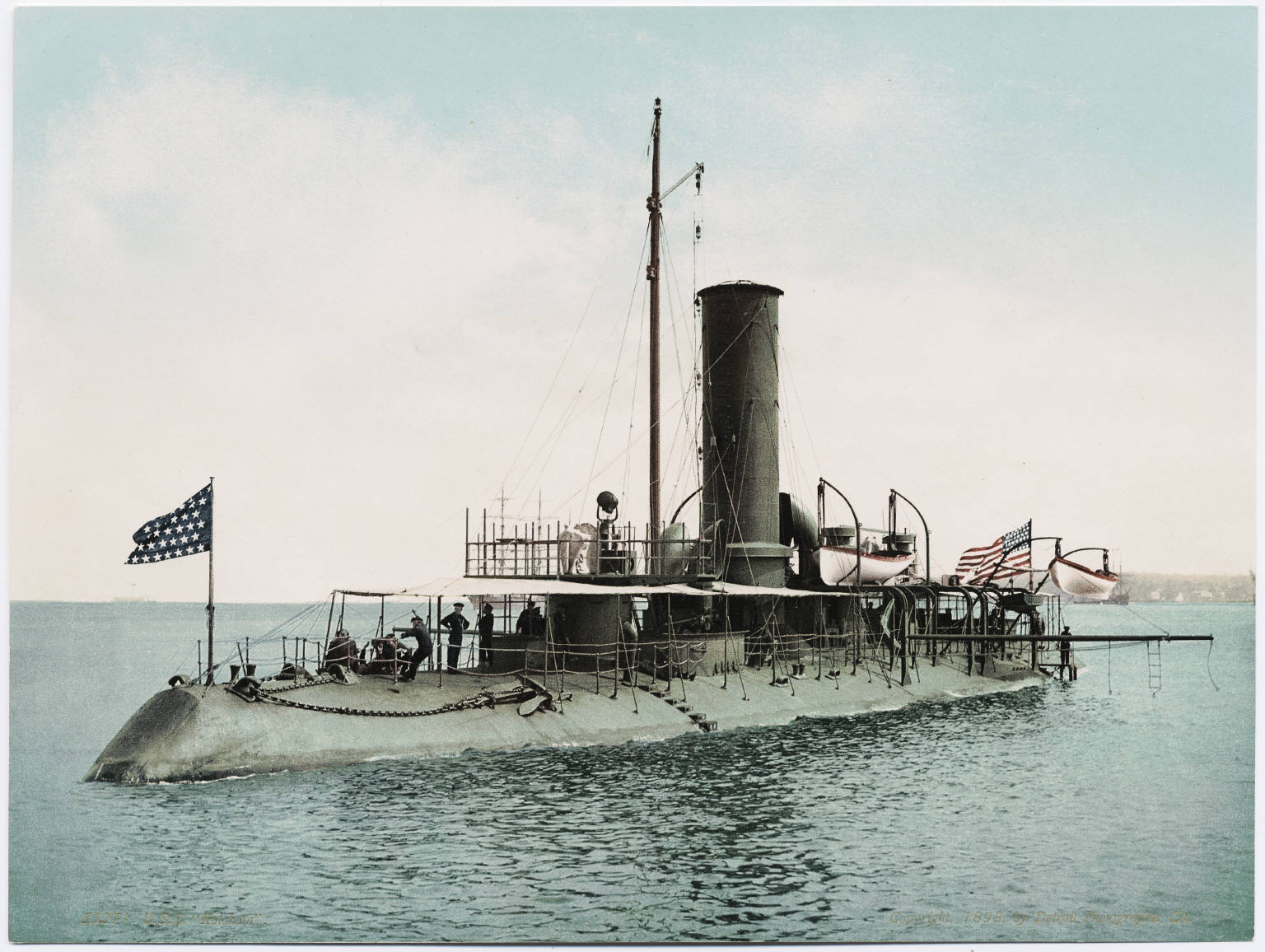
- USS Katahdin

History
- Name: USS Katahdin
- Builder: Bath Iron Works, Bath, Maine
- Launched: 4 February 1893
- Commissioned: 20 February 1897
- Decommissioned: 8 October 1898
- Stricken: 9 July 1909
- Fate: Sunk as target, September 1909

General characteristics
- Type: Steel armored ram
- Displacement: 2,155 long tons (2,190 t); 2,383 long tons (2,421 t) full load
- Length: 250 ft 9 in (76.43 m)
- Beam: 43 ft 5 in (13.23 m)
- Draft: 15 ft 1 in (4.60 m) (mean)
- Propulsion: 2 shaft horizontal triple expansion steam engines
- Speed: 16 knots (30 km/h; 18 mph)
- Complement: 97
- Armament: 4 × 6-pounder rifled guns
- Armor: Harvey and nickel steel; Sides: 6–3 in (152–76 mm); Deck: 6–2 in (152–51 mm); Uptakes: 6 in (150 mm); Conning tower: 18 in (460 mm)

USS Katahdin, a harbor-defense ram of innovative design, was the second ship of the United States Navy to be named for Mount Katahdin, a mountain peak in Maine.

== Design and construction ==
The inspiration behind Katahdin was Rear Admiral Daniel Ammen, an advocate of a coastal defense navy. Ammen was impressed by the British torpedo ram HMS Polyphemus. Unlike Polyphemus, which was primarily a torpedo boat, with ramming a secondary function, the American design was for a pure ram, with no torpedoes carried.

Katahdin's design was a new departure in naval architecture, built to ride extremely low in the water with her bow awash while under way. Her hull embodied several new features later used in early submarines. A similar design was the whaleback freighters of the Great Lakes which went into production in 1887.

An order was placed for construction of a prototype armored ram in 1889. Her keel was laid down by the Bath Iron Works of Bath, Maine in July 1891. She was launched on 4 February, 1893, sponsored by Miss Una Soley, daughter of James R. Soley, the Assistant Secretary of the Navy, and commissioned at the New York Navy Yard on 20 February 1897.

== Service history ==
Although Katahdin's engines were more powerful than specified, Katahdin failed to reach the contracted speed of 17 knots (31 km/h; 20 mph), requiring the passing of special legislation to allow her to be accepted by the Navy. Conditions aboard the ship were extremely uncomfortable, as it was cramped and had very poor ventilation, leading to almost intolerable temperatures being recorded.

Katahdin departed New York Harbor 4 March 1897, the day of President William McKinley's first inauguration, and sailed to Norfolk, Virginia, before decommissioning at Philadelphia Naval Yard on 17 April. A year later, with the Navy preparing for an impending war with Spain, she recommissioned there 10 March 1898. She was attached to the North Atlantic Squadron and operated along the Atlantic Coast from New England to Norfolk protecting the nation's seaboard cities from possible attack. After decisive American naval victories at Manila Bay and Santiago Harbor eliminated this threat, the ram decommissioned for the last time at Philadelphia Navy Yard on 8 October.

Katahdin was stricken from the Naval Vessel Register on 9 July 1909 and designated "Ballistic Experimental Target 'A'". Katahdin was sunk by gunfire at Rappahannock Spit, Virginia, that September.

== See also ==
- "Contract and Screw Trials of the U.S.S. Kathadin", Journal of the American Society of Naval Engineers, v.8, February, 1896, pages 1–20 (Full technical engineering details including drawings, description of contract issues)
- USS Vesuvius
