= Othniel Tripp =

- Born: c. 1826; Maine
- Military career
- Allegiance: United States of America; Union
- Branch: United States Navy; Union Navy
- Rank: Chief Boatswain's Mate
- Unit: USS Seneca (1861)
- Conflicts: American Civil War • Second Battle of Fort Fisher
- Awards: Medal of Honor

Othniel Tripp (c. 1826 – unknown) was a sailor in the U.S. Navy stationed aboard the USS Seneca (1861) during the American Civil War. He received the Medal of Honor for his actions during the Second Battle of Fort Fisher on January 15, 1865.

== Military service ==
Tripp volunteered for service in the U.S. Navy and was assigned to the Union gunboat USS Seneca (1861). His enlistment is credited to the state of Maine.

On January 15, 1865, the North Carolina Confederate stronghold of Fort Fisher was taken by a combined Union storming party of sailors, marines, and soldiers under the command of Admiral David Dixon Porter and General Alfred Terry. Chief Tripp was a member of the storming party.

== Medal of Honor citation ==
"The President of the United States of America, in the name of Congress, takes pleasure in presenting the Medal of Honor to Chief Boatswain's Mate Othniel Tripp, United States Navy, for extraordinary heroism in action while serving on board the U.S.S. Seneca in the assault on Fort Fisher, North Carolina, 15 January 1865. Despite severe enemy fire which halted an attempt by his assaulting party to enter the stockade, Chief Boatswain's Mate Tripp boldly charged through the gap in the stockade although the center of the line, being totally unprotected, fell back along the open beach and left too few in the ranks to attempt an offensive operation."

General Orders: War Department, General Orders No. 59 (June 22, 1865)

Action Date: January 15, 1865

Service: Navy

Rank: Chief Boatswain's Mate

Division: U.S.S. Seneca

== See also ==
- List of Medal of Honor recipients
- List of American Civil War Medal of Honor recipients: T–Z
