= Charles Belknap Jr. =

Charles K. Belknap Jr.
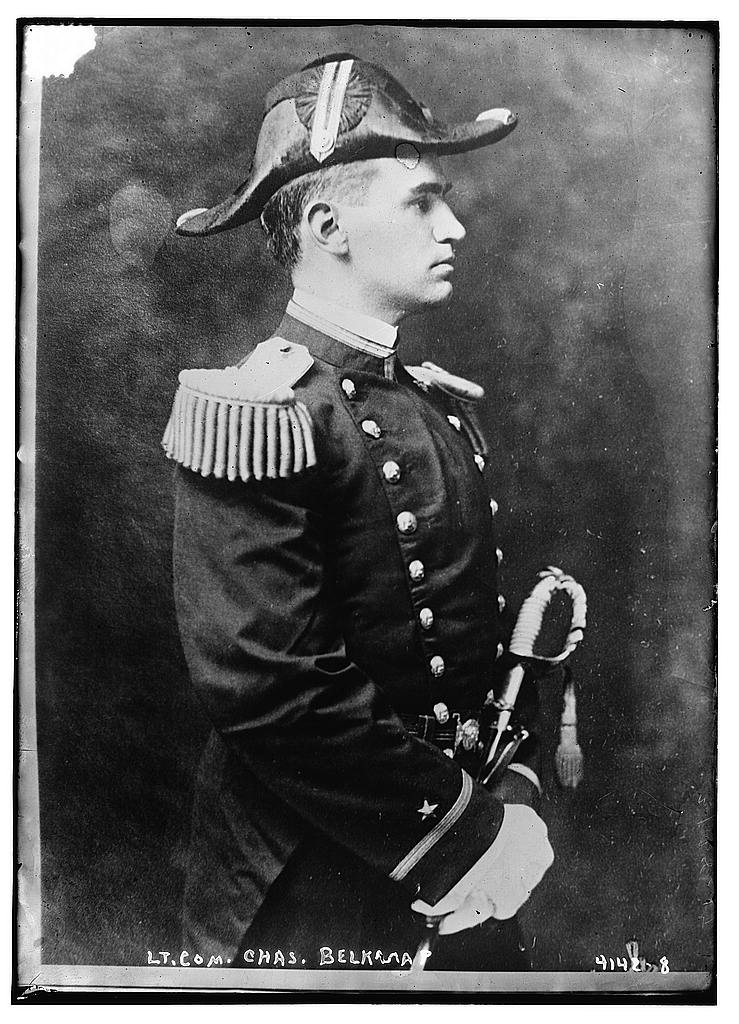
- Ensign Charles Belknap Jr. circa 1903
- Born: September 6, 1880; Concord, Massachusetts, U.S.
- Died: December 29, 1954 (aged 74) St. Louis, Missouri, U.S.
- Allegiance: United States
- Branch: United States Navy
- Service years: 1899–1919
- Rank: Commander
- Commands: USS Ammen (DD-35)
- Conflicts: World War I
- Awards: Navy Cross, Army Distinguished Service Medal, Victory Medal

Commander Charles K. Belknap Jr. (September 6, 1880 - December 29, 1954) was the commander of the USS Ammen (DD-35) in 1913. He was the censor for the United States Navy in 1917.

== Biography ==
He was born on September 6, 1880, in Concord, Massachusetts to Charles K. Belknap Sr. He attended Yale University from 1898 to 1899, the United States Naval Academy from 1899 to 1903. He married Gladys Goodrich on October 26, 1909, in Pomfret, Connecticut.

Belknap was the commander of the destroyer USS Ammen (DD-35) in 1913 and attended the Naval War College from 1915 to 1916. He was promoted to the rank of lieutenant commander on August 29, 1916.

== World War I ==
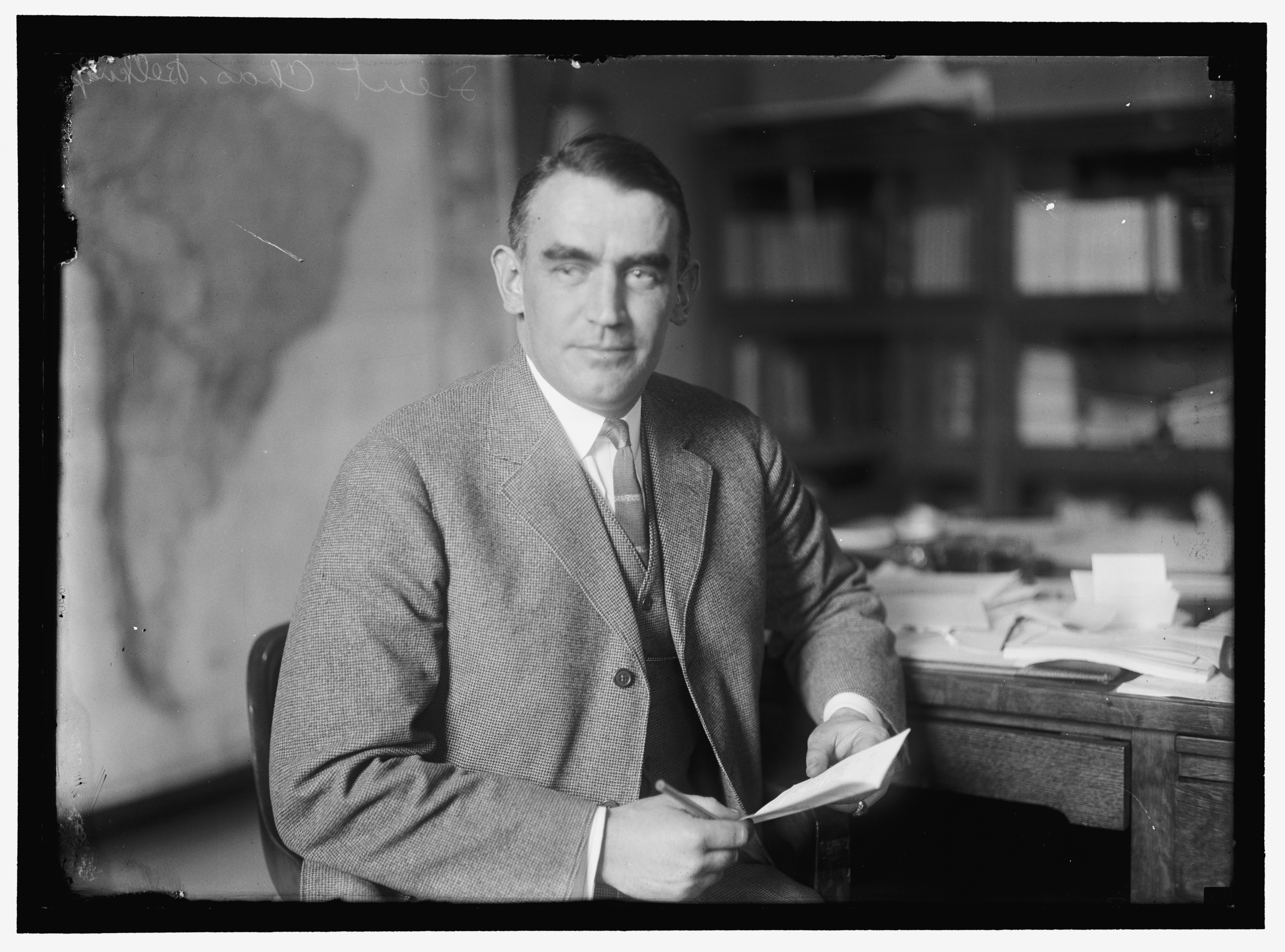
Belknap as censor in 1917

After the United States' declaration of war on Germany in April 1917, Belknap worked as a censor for the United States Navy. Due to a shortage of experienced officers, he received a temporary promotion to commander on January 1, 1918.

On January 9, 1918, shortly after his promotion to commander, Belknap was appointed director of the newly formed Naval Overseas Transportation Service (NOTS). In this position, Belknap was responsible for Navy cargo ships and all auxiliary vessels not assigned to the fleet or the various naval districts.

== Later life ==
After the war's conclusion, Belknap resigned from the Navy on December 7, 1919.

He died on December 29, 1954, in St. Louis, Missouri. He was buried in the United States Naval Academy Cemetery.

== Awards ==
In 1919 Belknap received the Navy Cross from the Navy and also the Distinguished Service Medal from the Army for his service with the Naval Overseas Transportation Service during World War I. He was one of a very few individuals to receive both the Navy Cross and the Army Distinguished Service Medal.

He was also entitled to the Victory Medal.
