= USS Sproston (DD-577) =

Fletcher-class destroyer

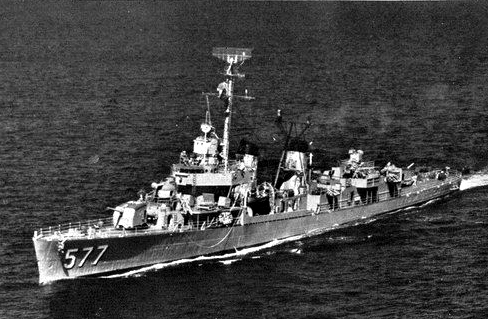
- USS Sproston (DDE-577) underway in 1958

History

United States
- Namesake: John G. Sproston
- Ordered: 1940
- Builder: Consolidated Steel Corporation, Orange, Texas
- Laid down: 1 April 1942
- Launched: 31 August 1942
- Commissioned: 19 May 1943 to 18 January 1946; 15 September 1950 to 30 September 1968
- Stricken: 1 October 1968
- Fate: Sold for scrap, 15 September 1971

General characteristics
- Class & type: Fletcher-class destroyer
- Displacement: 2,150 tons, 3,035 tons fully loaded
- Length: 376 ft 6 in (114.7 m)
- Beam: 39 ft 8 in (12.1 m)
- Draft: 17 ft 9 in (5.4 m)
- Propulsion: 60,000 shp (45 MW); 2 propellers
- Speed: 35 knots (65 km/h; 40 mph)
- Range: 6500 nmi. (12,000 km) at 15 kt
- Complement: 273
- Armament: 5 × 5 in (130 mm), 4 × 40 mm AA guns, 4 × 20 mm AA guns, 10 × 21 inch (533 mm) torpedo tubes, 6 × depth charge projectors, 2 × depth charge tracks

USS Sproston (DD-577) was a Fletcher-class destroyer of the United States Navy. She was the second ship named for US Naval Lieutenant John G. Sproston, who was killed in action while leading an attack on a Confederate ironclad during the American Civil War.

== History ==
Sproston was laid down on 1 April 1942 by the Consolidated Steel Corporation, Orange, Tex.; launched on 31 August 1942; sponsored by Mrs. Aline G. Darst; and commissioned on 19 May 1943.

=== World War II ===
Following shakedown off Cuba, Sproston transited the Panama Canal on 4 November 1943. After a brief stop at San Francisco, California, she sailed for Pearl Harbor on 15 November and, 11 days later, headed for the Aleutian Islands. She entered Kuluk Bay, Adak, on 1 December and was assigned to Destroyer Squadron (DesRon) 49, a unit of Task Force (TF) 94.

She spent the next two months in gunnery practice and exercises. On 1 February 1944, Sproston departed Massacre Bay with TF 94 to shell targets in the Kuril Islands. On 4 February, she bombarded Kurabu Point in the Kurabu-Saki area of Paramushiro Island. One month later, the task force sailed north in the Sea of Okhotsk to strike targets in the Kurils again; but, because of extremely heavy seas and poor visibility, the mission was aborted.

Sproston spent the next three months on antisubmarine sweeps and patrols off the Aleutians. On 10 June, she was again underway for the Kuriles where she participated in the pre-dawn bombardment of Matsuwa Island. On the 26th, she shelled Kurabu Zaki airfield on the southern end of Paramushiro Island.

On 8 August, Sproston departed Sweeper Cove, Adak, for a two-week stay in San Francisco before sailing for the South Pacific war zone. En route, she made port at Pearl Harbor, Eniwetok, and Manus. In October, she was assigned to Task Unit 79.11.2 whose primary mission was to screen transports of Task Group 79.2 off Dulag, Leyte Island, during the initial campaign to liberate the Philippines.

On 25 October, with supporting fire from Hale (DD-642) and Pickens (APA-190), she shot down her first enemy plane. On 18 November, in San Pedro Bay, Sproston's gunners downed two "Zekes" of a five-plane attack force.

In late December 1944 and early January 1945, Sproston patrolled in the Lingayen area of central Luzon. On 8 January, another Japanese plane fell victim to her guns. From Lingayen, she sailed to the Zambales area to support landing operations there. At 12:48 on 29 January, she entered Subic Bay. Sproston was believed to be the first United States warship to enter Subic Bay since the Japanese occupation had begun. She continued operations in the Philippine Islands until 18 February when she was assigned to escort duty. Ordered to Guam for a week, she was in Apra Harbor from 25 February to 1 March when she sailed for Milne Bay. By 13 March, she was back in Leyte Gulf.

On 21 March, she was underway for Kerama Retto and Okinawa Gunto, Ryukyu Islands. Sproston relieved Heywood L. Edwards (DD-663) on 26 March and began picket and patrol duty. That evening, her guns hit a "Jill" which departed in flames. On 2 April, she provided call fire on Makiminato Saki, destroying two enemy pillboxes and a warehouse.

Sproston received damage to her sonar equipment and the Mk 1A main battery computer on 4 April by the near miss of a bomb which exploded 50 yards (50 m) off her port beam. There were no casualties, and the sonar equipment was quickly repaired, but the main battery could be fired only by local control. She retired to Guam for repair of her Mk 1A computer and was back on station within two weeks. Off Hagushi Beach on 12 May, she fired 16 rounds at an enemy plane which burst into flames and crashed. On 28 May Sproston and Wadsworth (DD-516) downed two planes within an hour. With supporting fire from Bradford (DD-545), she splashed another on the 29th. On 6 June, she rescued a pilot from escort carrier Gilbert Islands (CVE-107) whose plane had been shot down.

On 28 June, while she was steaming independently toward the United States for overhaul, Sproston was signalled, between Saipan and Eniwetok, by Antares (AKS-3), that she was under submarine attack and required assistance. Arriving in the vicinity of the submarine, Sproston made good sonar contact at a range of 1,000 yards (1,000 m). At 500 yards (500 m) a periscope was observed passing from starboard to port. The destroyer made an unsuccessful attempt to ram the submarine which was then identified as a fleet type. Sproston dropped a full pattern of depth charges, and a large oil slick was later observed. She made six more attacks with negative results. After all her depth charges were expended, a lookout spotted a torpedo wake approaching Sproston, 60° off her port bow. Sproston turned hard left and the torpedo passed along her port side. A periscope was then sighted off the port quarter belonging to a kaiten, a suicide submarine that had been released from the IJN fleet submarine I-36 in order to allow it to escape. A total of two kaitens were released from I-36 which were piloted by Ens Kuge Minoru and FPO1C Yanagiya Hidemasa. Once sighted the main battery commenced firing, and one salvo found its mark, causing a large secondary explosion which sank the kaiten. LC7-555, LSM-196, and LSM-197 arrived to help conduct night radar coverage of the area. The next morning, Parks (DE-165), Levy (DE-162), and Roberts (DE-749) joined the group. After a thorough search, all ships were directed to carry out their previous orders.

Sproston arrived at San Francisco on 14 July 1945 where she underwent yard overhaul and prepared for inactivation: She moved to San Diego in mid-December and was placed out of commission on 18 January 1946.

=== Korean War ===
After Communist forces invaded South Korea, Sproston was recommissioned as DDE-577 on 15 September 1950. Her initial training was conducted with the Fleet Training Group, San Diego. Sproston departed San Diego in early 1951 for Eniwetok to participate in the atomic bomb test. When the test was over in July, Sproston sailed to her new home port, Pearl Harbor, and began the normal routine of Pacific Fleet destroyers: holding fleet, type, and individual exercises.

In early 1952, she entered the shipyard for overhaul and then, after refresher training, she sailed, on 2 June, for the Far East.

On 15 June, Sproston was assigned to Task Force 77, the 7th Fleet Striking Force, operating off the east coast of Korea in the Hungnam-Simpo area. During the next six months, she participated in the Taiwan Patrol when not assigned to TF 77.

Sproston returned to Pearl Harbor on 5 December 1952 and began a regular operating schedule as a member of DesRon 25. In the next decade, she made nine cruises to the Far East for operations with the Seventh Fleet. She spent part of most deployment on the Taiwan Patrol and also participated in amphibious and other type exercises. In 1958 and in 1961, Sproston was awarded the Battle Efficiency E. She entered the Pearl Harbor Naval Shipyard for major overhaul, but due to the semi-mobilization of forces during the Berlin Wall crisis, her overhaul funds were cut to just over $400,000, well short of the $750,000 needed for major engineering plant repairs and replacement of parts of the hull, as well as the usual items addressed in a major overhaul. The crew, undeterred by the situation, on their own, re-tubed all four boilers, and with some assistance from the shipyard, made major repairs to the electric generators and to the evaporators that produced fresh water for the ship.

=== Vietnam war ===
In 1962, she was redesignated DD-577. During the Cuban Missile Crisis in October 1962, Sproston, which was deployed to the Seventh Fleet at the time, was detailed to patrol the straits of Tsushima to block any attempt by Soviet submarines to sortie from the Sea of Japan into the Pacific. The only submarine encountered was the USS Queenfish. During the transit back to Hawaii in December 1962, Sproston was part of the Hornet group which had taken the great circle course across the northern Pacific. Several days prior to their scheduled arrival at Pearl Harbor, the group ran into a heavy gale, with winds in excess of 60 knots, accompanied by towering seas. Damage among the ships of the group was so extensive, they had to put into Midway for voyage repairs. A great circle route is the shortest sailing distance on the earth's spherical surface, and was taken in order to arrive home for Christmas as quickly as possible. However, it was ill-advised to do so in the North Pacific in winter, when storms such as that encountered are the norm. Thus the ships arrived later than if they had sailed the longer southern rhumb line route. "The best laid plans . . . ." Normal operating duties continued through 1963 and 1964. In March 1965, she began a five-month overhaul in the Pearl Harbor Navy Yard. When this was completed, she conducted extensive refresher training to prepare her crew for deployment to the western Pacific.

Sproston departed Pearl Harbor on 27 December with Ranger (CVA-61), England (DLG-22), and Carpenter (DD-825) and headed, via Subic Bay, for the Vietnam coast. The group arrived at Dixie Station off the coast of South Vietnam on 16 January 1966 and remained there until 13 February. Sproston was assigned rescue and antisubmarine screening duties. On the 18th, she was directed to proceed to Phuoc Hui Bay to provide naval gunfire support. During the night, the ship shelled Viet Cong base camps and assembly areas.

On 19 January 1966 she rejoined the carrier task group which had moved to Yankee Station in the Gulf of Tonkin. Sproston was detached from 5–11 February to perform trawler surveillance and blocking. During this time, she observed a Russian Okean-class vessel, the Gidrofon, which was believed to be gathering electronic and tactical information. She rejoined the carrier group which returned to Subic Bay until 22 February.

Back at Yankee Station, Sproston was again detached for naval gunfire support duty. She arrived off the coast, in the II Corps area, on 1 March and remained there until the 20th, firing 40 support missions for the 1st Cavalry Division and South Vietnamese Marines. The most eventful came on 9 March when, during a three-hour battle, her guns helped to repulse a battalion-strength Viet Cong attack against Republic of Vietnam Marines near Tam Quan.

On 21 March, she and the Task Group proceeded to Yokosuka whence it departed on 5 April for another tour at Dixie Station. Sproston worked with Ranger at both Dixie Station and Yankee Station during the patrol.

Sproston was detached from the Task Group on 4 May and visited Hong Kong, Subic Bay, and Yokosuka before she returned to Pearl Harbor for upkeep and the installation of a recovery crane as she had been selected to participate in an Apollo spacecraft recovery.

On 25 August, she was on station off Kwajalein when the spacecraft passed overhead and landed 200 nautical miles (370 km) north, where it was recovered by Hornet (CVS-12). Sproston returned to Pearl Harbor on 2 September and remained there undergoing repair services and conducting type training for the remainder of the year.

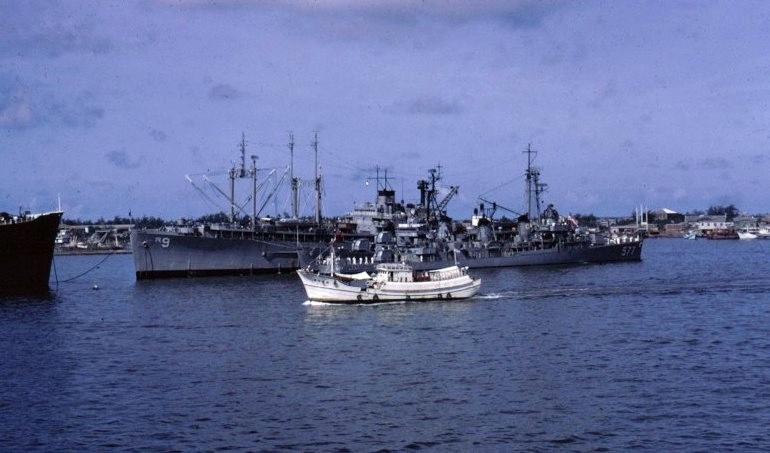
Sproston alongside USS Delta (AR-9), in 1967.

In January and February 1967, Sproston conducted local operations to prepare for her 1967 deployment to the Far East. She sailed for Yokosuka on 6 March and, one month later, was back at Yankee Station. She participated in Operation Sea Lion and provided gunfire support until 14 May. She then joined Hancock (CVA-19) as escort and plane guard for two and one-half months. During this period of deployment, she performed trawler surveillance duty at Yankee Station several times when the Russian ships AGI Deflektor, Barograf, and Gidrofon entered the area.

Sproston and Carpenter departed Vietnam on 4 August for Sydney, Australia, where they participated in a joint ASW exercise with units of the British and New Zealand navies off the coast of New Zealand.

Having steamed almost 40,000 nautical miles (74,000 km) since leaving Pearl Harbor, Sproston returned to her home port on 11 September. She underwent general repairs and conducted local operations until the last of December 1967 when she was ordered to Guam for yard availability.

Upon completion of yard work in mid-March, Sproston returned to Pearl Harbor until 29 July when she sailed for the west coast. When she arrived in San Diego, she was notified that she was to be decommissioned. She sailed to Pearl Harbor late in August and, on 30 September 1968, was placed out of commission. Sproston was struck from the Navy list on 10 October 1968 and sold to Chou's Iron and Steel Co., Taipei, Taiwan, for scrap.

== Honors ==
Sproston received five battle stars for World War II, one for Korean service, and three for Vietnamese service.
