= USS Seneca (1861) =

Gunboat of the United States Navy

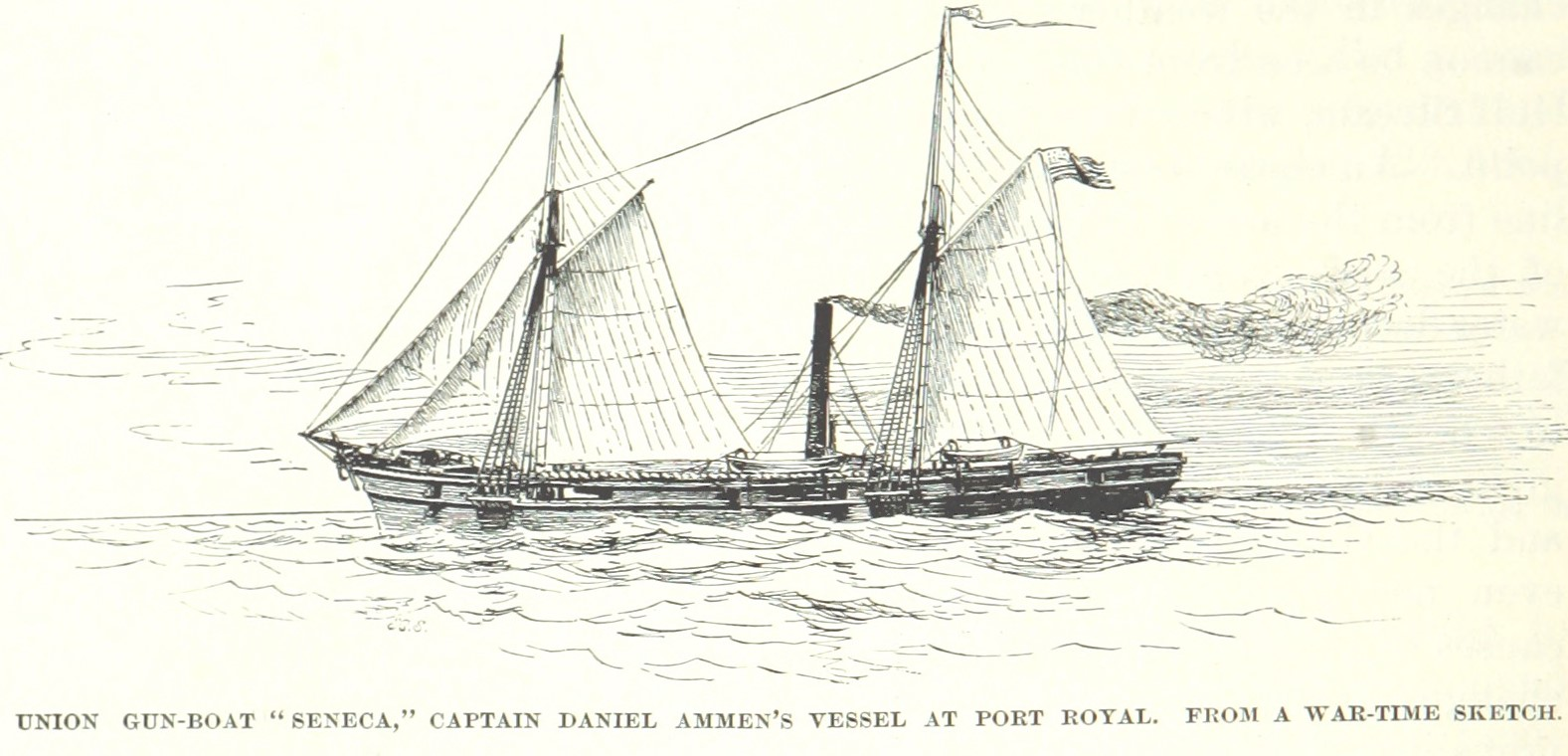
- USS Seneca

History

United States
- Name: USS Seneca
- Builder: J. Simonson
- Launched: 27 August 1861 at New York City
- Commissioned: 14 October 1861 at the New York Navy Yard
- Decommissioned: 24 June 1865 at Norfolk, Virginia
- Stricken: 1868 (est.)
- Home port: Norfolk, Virginia
- Fate: Sold on 10 September 1868

General characteristics
- Class & type: Unadilla-class gunboat
- Displacement: 691 tons
- Tons burthen: 507
- Length: 158 ft (48 m) (waterline)
- Beam: 28 ft (8.5 m)
- Draft: 9 ft 6 in (2.90 m) (max.)
- Depth of hold: 12 ft (3.7 m)
- Installed power: 200 IHP
- Propulsion: 2 × horizontal back-acting engines; single screw
- Sail plan: Two-masted schooner
- Speed: 10 kn (11.5 mph)
- Complement: 114
- Armament: 1 × 11-in Dahlgren smoothbore; 2 × 24-pdr smoothbore; 2 × 20-pdr Parrott rifle

USS Seneca was a Unadilla-class gunboat built on behalf of the United States Navy for service during the American Civil War. Seneca was outfitted with guns for horizontal fire as well as with two howitzers for bombardment of shore targets. With her crew of 84, she was assigned to the Union blockade of the Confederate States of America.

== Commissioned at New York City in 1861 ==
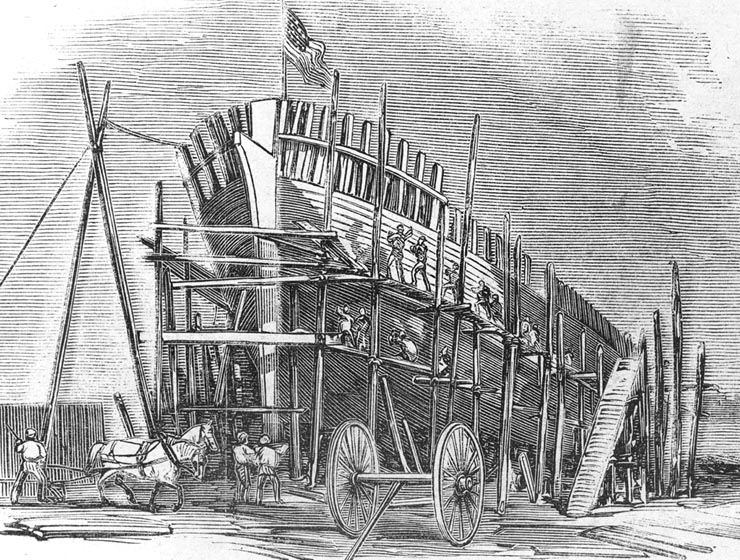
Seneca under construction

One of the "Ninety-day gunboats", Seneca – the first United States Navy ship to be so named – was built at New York City by Jeremiah Simonson and launched on 27 August 1861. She was commissioned at the New York Navy Yard on 14 October 1861, Lieutenant Daniel Ammen in command. Her executive officer was John G. Sproston of Maryland.

== Civil War service ==
=== North and South Atlantic blockade operations ===
On 5 November 1861, Seneca and three other Federal Union gunboats engaged and dispersed a Confederate squadron near Port Royal, South Carolina; two days later, she took part in the capture of Port Royal, which proved to be an invaluable Union naval base throughout the remainder of the Civil War. From the 9th–12th, she took part in the expedition which took possession of Beaufort, South Carolina. On 5 December, she participated in the operations about Tybee Sound to help seal off Savannah, Georgia. The next day, she was in sight during the capture of schooner Cheshire, entitling her crew to share in prize money.

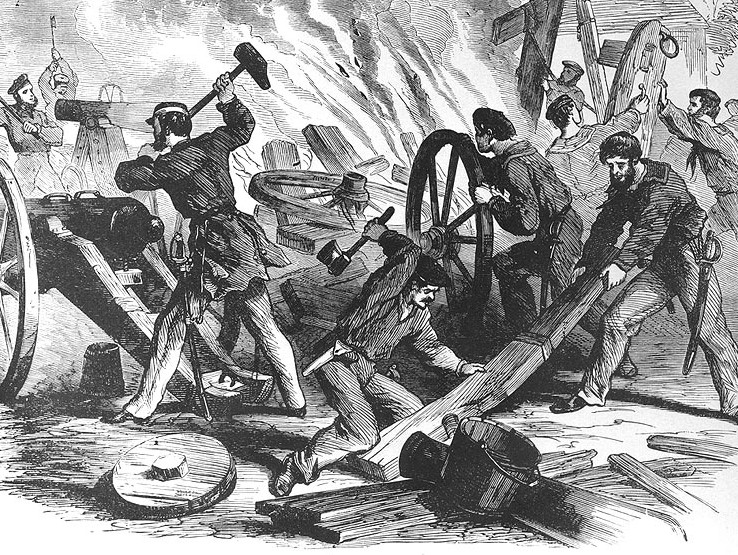
Crew of Seneca, led by their commanding officer, Lieutenant Daniel Ammen, destroying enemy ordnance during the capture of Beaufort in November 1861.

From January 1862 – January 1863, Seneca's area of operations extended from Wilmington, North Carolina to Florida. On 27 January 1863, she took part in the attack on Fort McAllister, and on 1 February she participated in a second attack. On 28 February, in the Ogeechee River, she supported USS Montauk in the destruction of privateer Rattlesnake, the former Confederate warship CSS Nashville. In July 1863, she was one of the vessels in the attack on Fort Wagner. She later returned via Port Royal to the New York Navy Yard where she was decommissioned on 15 January 1864.

=== Reassigned to the North Atlantic blockade ===
She was recommissioned on 3 October, Commander George Belknap in command, and was assigned to the North Atlantic Blockading Squadron. On 24–25 December, Seneca took part in the abortive attack on Fort Fisher, and from 13 to 15 January 1865 she participated in the successful second attack which finally captured that Southern coastal stronghold and doomed Wilmington, North Carolina, closing the Confederacy's last major seaport. One of her crewmen, Chief Boatswain's Mate Othniel Tripp, was awarded the Medal of Honor for his actions in that battle. On 17 February, she was in the force which attacked Fort Anderson and captured it two days later.

== Post-war decommissioning ==
At the end of the war, Seneca returned to Norfolk, Virginia, where she was decommissioned on 24 June. The ship was sold on 10 September 1868 at Norfolk to Purvis and Company.

- United States Navy
- List of United States Navy ships
