= SS Ocean Queen (1857) =

Ship

History

United States
- Name: Queen of the Pacific (1857–1859); Ocean Queen (1859–1875)
- Owner: Morgan & Garrison (1857–1859); European Line (1859–1875)
- Builder: Westervelt & Co., New York City
- Launched: April 1857
- Fate: Scrapped, 1875

General characteristics
- Type: Side-wheel paddle steamer
- Tonnage: 2,801 GRT
- Length: 327 ft (100 m)
- Beam: 42 ft (13 m)
- Propulsion: Morgan Iron Works steam engine, side-paddle wheels
- Speed: 12 knots (22 km/h; 14 mph)
- Capacity: 350 passengers

Ocean Queen was a side-paddled wooden ship built in 1857 by Stephen G. Bogert, of the Westervelt & Co. Shipyard of New York City. The engines were built by the Morgan Iron Works, also in New York City. The original name of the ship was Queen of the Pacific.

== Dimensions ==
This was a 2,801 gross ton ship, with a length of 327 feet and a beam measuring 42 feet. It had a straight stem, two funnels and two masts. The ship was of wooden construction, with side-paddle propulsion and a speed of 12 knots. There was accommodation for 350 1st- & 2nd-class passengers.

== History ==
=== Queen of the Pacific ===
Launched in April 1857, Queen of the Pacific had been ordered by the Morgan & Garrison Partnership. This was a company set up as part of the scheme of Charles Morgan and Charles Garrison to replace the Accessory Transit Company of Cornelius Vanderbilt as the dominant company serving the lucrative New York – San Francisco trade route during the period of the California Gold Rush. Morgan and Garrison were trustees of Vanderbilt's company. The Partnership had been set up in connection with the armed takeover of Nicaragua by the American adventurer William Walker, with the help of some 100 other United States citizens. Declaring himself President of the Republic, Walker then cancelled the charter of Vanderbilt's Transit Company to transport passengers across the Isthmus of Panama and seized its property, transferring it to Morgan & Garrison.

Vanderbilt was enraged by this betrayal by his own trustees. In a famous letter he sent the rival company, he swore to crush the enterprise, rather than waste time in legal action. He successfully lobbied the U.S. government to withhold recognition of Walker's puppet state. Walker was soon defeated by Central American forces and Morgan & Grant came to an end.

=== Ocean Queen ===
By that time, the waning of the Gold Rush meant decreased demand for transit to California. The ship was sold to Cornelius Vanderbilt's European Line in 1859, altered, and renamed. On 17 May 1859, she commenced her first New York – Southampton – Le Havre voyage. The fifth—and final—crossing from Le Havre to Southampton and New York started on 23 November 1859. In 1861, she was chartered to the United States War Department, for which she sailed until the end of the American Civil War.

In June 1864, Ocean Queen transported 217 Navy recruits from New York City to Aspinwall, Panama. Approximately 30 mutineers tried to seize the command of the ship, but Navy Commander Daniel Ammen, who was in charge of the recruits aboard the ship and Captain Tinklepaugh shot the leaders of the mutiny and regained control of the vessel.

After the Civil War, she continued sailing between New York and Panama, carrying passengers destined for California, who then had to take a train across the Isthmus and find passage on the Pacific side. She commenced her first New York – Bremen – Copenhagen voyage under charter to Ruger Brothers & Associates on 7 April 1869. One further voyage was made, leaving from New York to Le Havre, Brouwershaven, Swinemünde, Copenhagen, Christiansand, arriving back in New York on 2 May 1870.

=== Notable Passenger ===
The only passenger known (so far) to have achieved some note of fame was William Jay Gaynor, later the Mayor of New York (1910–1913), who eventually died of an assassin's bullet in 1913. He had sailed this ship in his youth, when he was a Roman Catholic teaching Brother, a member of the Brothers of the Christian Schools, better known as the Lasallian Christian Brothers. He was part of a group of seven Brothers sent to staff the newly founded St. Mary's College of California in San Francisco. They set sail from New York on the Ocean Queen on 16 July 1868, landing in Aspinwall, Panama, from which they then proceeded to San Francisco by train and ship.

=== End of the voyage ===
The ship was scrapped in 1875 in Wilmington, Delaware.

== Sources ==
- North Atlantic Seaway by N.R.P. Bonsor, vol.1, p. 333
