= USS Sproston (DD-173) =

Wickes-class destroyer of the United States Navy

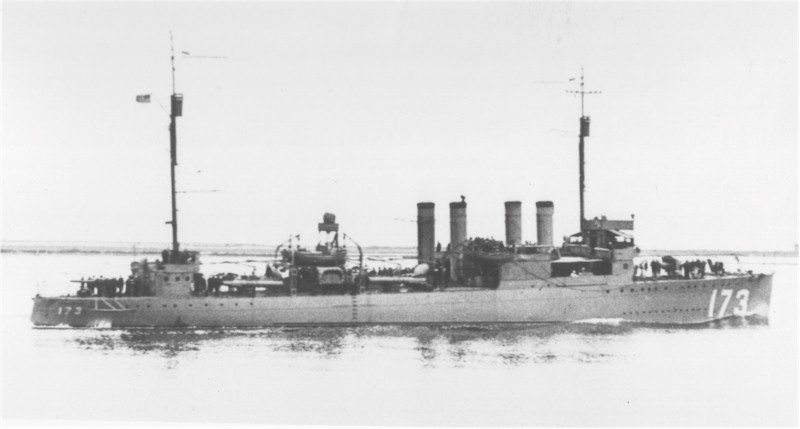
- USS Sproston (DD-173)

History

United States
- Namesake: John G. Sproston
- Builder: Union Iron Works, San Francisco, California
- Laid down: 20 April 1918
- Launched: 10 August 1918
- Commissioned: 12 July 1919
- Reclassified: Light minelayer, DM-13, 17 July 1920
- Decommissioned: 15 August 1922
- Stricken: 1 December 1936
- Fate: Sunk as target 20 July 1937

General characteristics
- Class & type: Wickes-class destroyer
- Displacement: 1,202–1,208 long tons (1,221–1,227 t) (standard); 1,295–1,322 long tons (1,316–1,343 t) (deep load)
- Length: 314 ft 4 in (95.8 m)
- Beam: 30 ft 11 in (9.42 m)
- Draught: 9 ft 10 in (3.0 m)
- Installed power: 27,000 shp (20,000 kW); 4 water-tube boilers
- Propulsion: 2 shafts, 2 steam turbines
- Speed: 35 knots (65 km/h; 40 mph) (design)
- Range: 2,500 nautical miles (4,600 km; 2,900 mi) at 20 knots (37 km/h; 23 mph) (design)
- Complement: 6 officers, 108 enlisted men
- Armament: 4 × single 4-inch (102 mm) guns; 2 × single 1-pounder AA guns; 4 × triple 21 inch (533 mm) torpedo tubes; 2 × depth charge rails

USS Sproston (DD-173) was a Wickes-class destroyer built for the United States Navy during World War I.

== Description ==
The Wickes class was an improved and faster version of the preceding Caldwell class. Two different designs were prepared to the same specification that mainly differed in the turbines and boilers used. The ships built to the Bethlehem Steel design, built in the Fore River and Union Iron Works shipyards, mostly used Yarrow boilers that deteriorated badly during service and were mostly scrapped during the 1930s. The ships displaced 1,202–1,208 long tons (1,221–1,227 t) at standard load and 1,295–1,322 long tons (1,316–1,343 t) at deep load. They had an overall length of 314 feet 4 inches (95.8 m), a beam of 30 feet 11 inches (9.4 m) and a draught of 9 feet 10 inches (3.0 m). They had a crew of 6 officers and 108 enlisted men.

Performance differed radically between the ships of the class, often due to poor workmanship. The Wickes class was powered by two steam turbines, each driving one propeller shaft, using steam provided by four water-tube boilers. The turbines were designed to produce a total of 27,000 shaft horsepower (20,000 kW) intended to reach a speed of 35 knots (65 km/h; 40 mph). The ships carried 225 long tons (229 t) of fuel oil which was intended gave them a range of 2,500 nautical miles (4,600 km; 2,900 mi) at 20 knots (37 km/h; 23 mph).

The ships were armed with four 4-inch (102 mm) guns in single mounts and were fitted with two 1-pounder guns for anti-aircraft defense. Their primary weapon, though, was their torpedo battery of a dozen 21 inch (533 mm) torpedo tubes in four triple mounts. In many ships a shortage of 1-pounders caused them to be replaced by 3-inch (76 mm) anti-aircraft (AA) guns. They also carried a pair of depth charge rails. A "Y-gun" depth charge thrower was added to many ships.

== Construction and commissioning ==
Sproston, named for John G. Sproston, was laid down on 20 April 1918 by Union Iron Works at San Francisco, California. She was launched on 10 August 1918; sponsored by Mrs. George J. Dennis, and commissioned on 12 July 1919.

== Service history ==
Sproston proceeded to Hawaii and was assigned to the United States Pacific Fleet at Pearl Harbor in the fall of 1919. On 17 July 1920, she was reclassified as a light minelayer and given the new hull number DM-13. She continued to operate from Pearl Harbor until 1922.

On 15 August 1922, Sproston was decommissioned at Pearl Harbor and attached to the reserve fleet. She was struck from the Navy list on 1 December 1936 and sunk as a target on 20 July 1937.
