= USS Patapsco (1862) =

1862 Passaic-class ironclad monitor

Coordinates: 32.765252°N 79.891281°W

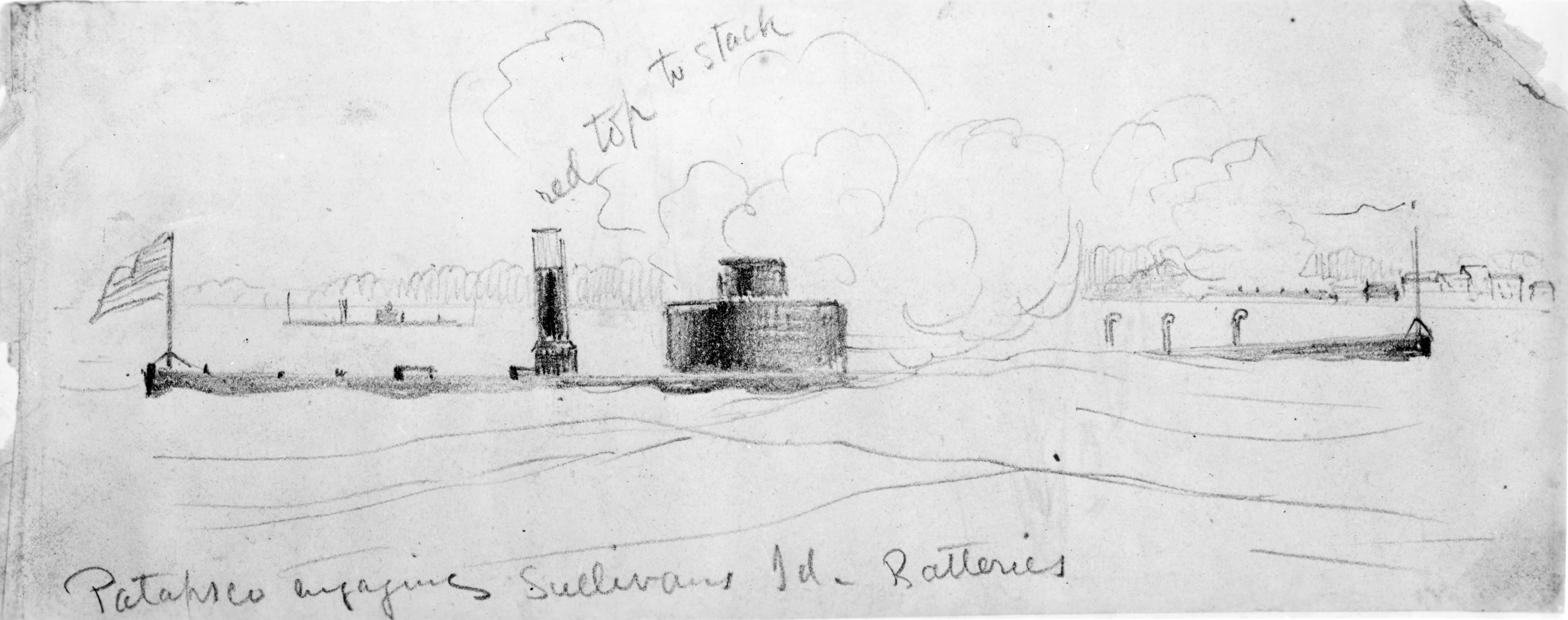
- Pencil sketch of USS Patapsco

History

United States
- Name: USS Patapsco
- Builder: Harlan & Hollingsworth
- Laid down: Unknown
- Launched: 27 September 1862
- Commissioned: 2 January 1863
- Stricken: 1865 (est.)
- Fate: Sunk by mine on 15 January 1865

General characteristics
- Class & type: Passaic-class ironclad monitor
- Displacement: 1,875 long tons (1,905 t)
- Length: 241 ft (73 m)
- Beam: 46 ft (14 m)
- Draft: 10 ft 10 in (3.30 m)
- Installed power: 320 ihp (240 kW)
- Propulsion: 1 × Ericsson vibrating lever engine; 2 × Martin boilers; 1 × shaft
- Speed: 6 kn (6.9 mph; 11 km/h)
- Complement: 105 officers and enlisted
- Armament: 1 × 15 in (380 mm) smoothbore gun, 1 × 8 in (200 mm) Parrott rifle
- Armor: Side: 3–5 in (7.6–12.7 cm); Turret: 11 in (28 cm); Deck: 1 in (2.5 cm)
- Notes: Armor is iron.

USS Patapsco was a Passaic-class ironclad monitor in the United States Navy during the American Civil War. She was named for the Patapsco River in Maryland.

== Built in Wilmington, Delaware ==
Patapsco was the fourth U.S. Navy ship to bear that name. She was built by Harlan & Hollingsworth, Wilmington, Delaware; launched on 27 September 1862; and commissioned on 2 January 1863, Commander Daniel Ammen in command.

== Civil War service ==
=== Assigned to the South Atlantic blockade ===
Assigned to the South Atlantic Blockading Squadron, she took part in a bombardment of Fort McAllister on 3 March. On 7 April, Patapsco joined eight other ironclads in a vigorous attack on Fort Sumter, and received 47 hits from Confederate gunfire during that day.

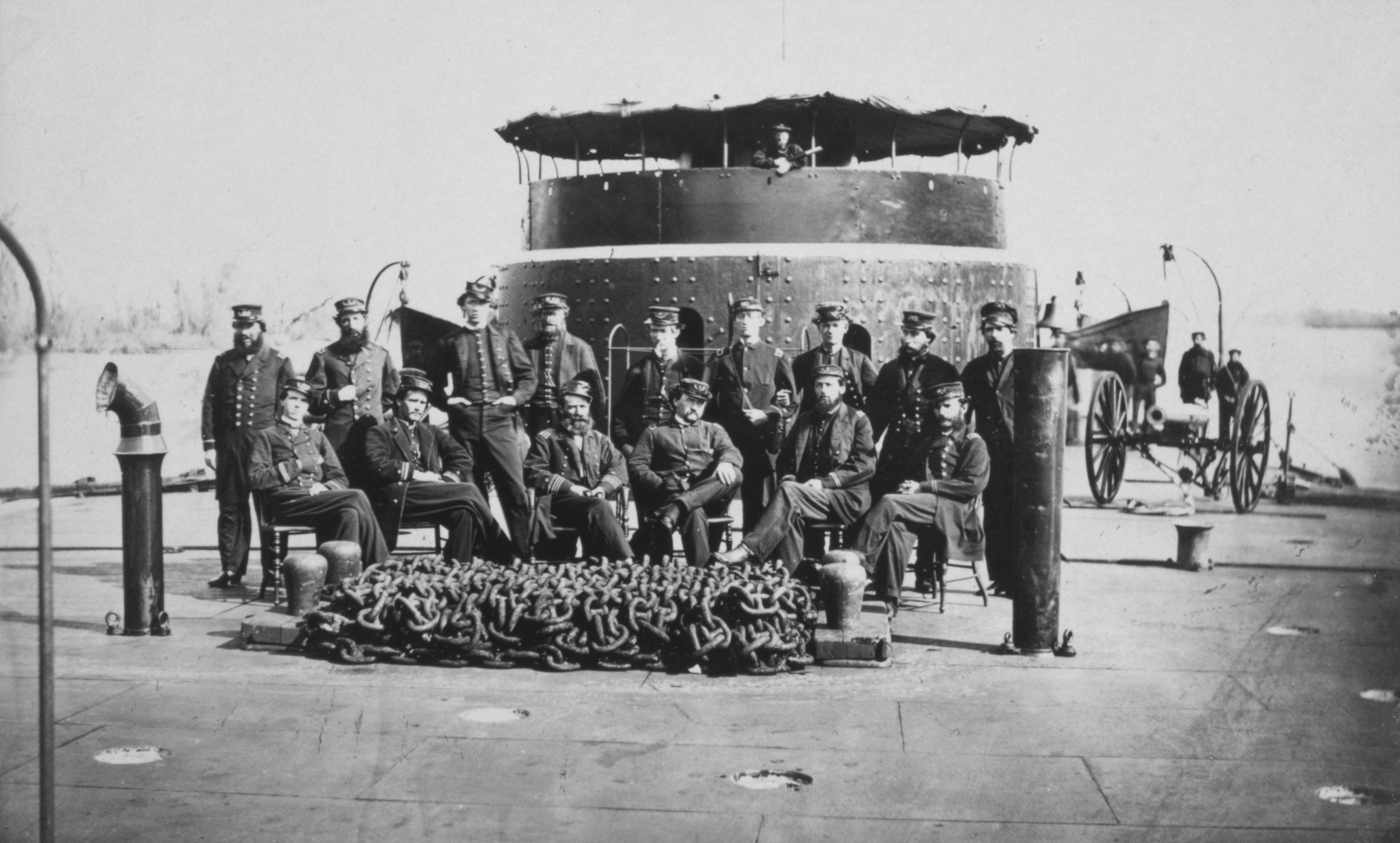
Officers of her sister ship Sangamon in the James River, 1865

Beginning in mid-July, she began her participation in a lengthy bombardment campaign against Charleston's defending fortifications. This led to the capture of Fort Wagner in early September. Fort Sumter was reduced to a pile of rubble, but remained a formidable opponent.

In November 1863, Patapsco tested a large obstruction-clearing explosive device that had been devised by John Ericsson. Remaining off South Carolina and Georgia during much of 1864 and into 1865, the monitor — or her boat crews — took part in a reconnaissance of the Wilmington River, Georgia, in January 1864 and helped capture or destroy enemy sailing vessels in February and November of that year.

=== Sunk by a mine ===
On 15 January 1865, while participating in obstruction clearance operations in Charleston Harbor, Patapsco struck a Confederate mine and sank, with 75 lost. The ship's Executive Officer, Lieutenant William T. Sampson was one of a handful of survivors.
