= USS Ammen (DD-35) =

Paulding-class destroyer

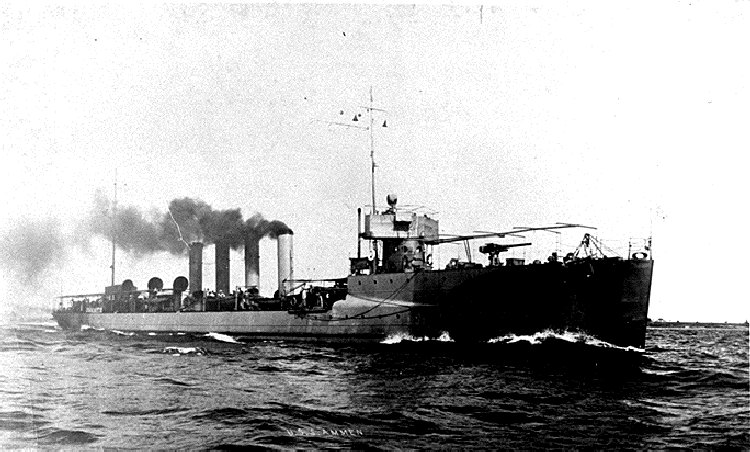
- USS Ammen (DD-35), undated, location unknown. Prior to World War I.

History

United States
- Name: Ammen
- Namesake: Rear Admiral Daniel Ammen
- Builder: New York Shipbuilding Company, Camden, New Jersey
- Cost: $655,075.13
- Laid down: 29 March 1910
- Launched: 20 September 1910
- Commissioned: 23 May 1911
- Decommissioned: 11 December 1919
- Stricken: 5 July 1934
- Identification: Hull symbol:DD-35; Code letters:NBP
- Fate: Transferred to the United States Coast Guard 28 April 1924; Broken up for scrap in 1934
- Notes: Ammen lost her name to new construction on 1 July 1933

United States
- Name: Ammen
- Acquired: 28 April 1924
- Commissioned: 22 January 1925
- Decommissioned: 18 May 1931
- Identification: Hull symbol:CG-8
- Fate: Transferred back to the United States Navy

General characteristics
- Class & type: Paulding-class destroyer
- Displacement: 742 long tons (754 t) normal; 887 long tons (901 t) full load
- Length: 293 ft 10 in (89.56 m)
- Beam: 27 ft (8.2 m)
- Draft: 8 ft 4 in (2.54 m) (mean)
- Installed power: 4 × boilers; 12,000 ihp (8,900 kW)
- Propulsion: 3 × Parsons Direct Drive Turbines; 3 × shafts
- Speed: 29.5 kn (33.9 mph; 54.6 km/h); 30.48 kn (35.08 mph; 56.45 km/h) (Speed on Trial)
- Complement: 4 officers 87 enlisted
- Armament: 5 × 3 in (76 mm)/50 caliber guns; 6 × 18-inch (450 mm) torpedo tubes (3 × 2)

The first USS Ammen (DD-35) was a Paulding-class destroyer in the United States Navy during World War I and later in the United States Coast Guard, designated as CG-8. She was named for Rear Admiral Daniel Ammen.

== Construction ==
Ammen was laid down on 29 March 1910 by the New York Shipbuilding Company, Camden, New Jersey; launched on 20 September 1910; sponsored by Miss Ethel C. Andrews; and commissioned at Philadelphia, Pennsylvania on 23 May 1911. Construction cost $655,075.13 (hull and machinery).

== World War I ==
Following commissioning, Ammen was assigned to the Atlantic Fleet. She operated with the Torpedo Flotilla along the east coast. Upon the outbreak of World War I in Europe in 1914, Ammen began neutrality patrols and escort duty along the east coast. After the United States entered the conflict in April 1917, Ammen sailed for the Bahamas on a reconnaissance mission. When she returned to the United States, the destroyer entered the Philadelphia Navy Yard on 6 May to be fitted out for overseas service. Ammen was assigned to Division 9, Destroyer Force, and sailed on 18 June for St. Nazaire, France.

After the arrival of the convoy at St. Nazaire on 2 July, Ammen proceeded to Queenstown, Ireland, and was attached to American naval forces based there. The ship carried out convoy escort duty between Ireland and France, patrolled off the Irish coast for enemy submarines, and went to the aid of vessels in distress. Ammen returned to the United States in January 1919. She made a cruise to the Gulf of Mexico before going out of commission at Philadelphia on 11 December 1919. The vessel was designated DD-35 on 17 July 1920.

== Inter-war period ==
Ammen remained at Philadelphia, Pennsylvania until 28 April 1924, when she was transferred to the Coast Guard, in whose hands she was redesignated CG-8. Ammen was one of 20 destroyers that formed the Coast Guard Offshore Patrol Force, established to help suppress bootlegging.

On 22 May 1931, Ammen was returned to the Navy, but she performed no further active service. Her name was dropped on 1 July 1933, and thereafter she was referred to as DD-35. She was struck from the Naval Vessel Register on 5 July 1934 and sold to Michael Flynn, Inc, Brooklyn, New York.
