= USS Experiment (1832) =

United States Navy schooner

History

United States
- Name: USS Experiment
- Builder: Washington Navy Yard
- Laid down: 1831
- Launched: April 1832
- Fate: Sold, October 1848

General characteristics
- Type: Schooner
- Displacement: 209 long tons (212 t)
- Length: 90 ft (27 m)
- Beam: 21 ft 6 in (6.55 m)
- Draft: 6 ft 1 in (1.85 m)
- Propulsion: Sail

USS Experiment was a schooner of the United States Navy launched in 1832. She was laid in 1831 in the Washington Navy Yard, and was launched in April 1832. Commissioned into the US Navy, Lieutenant William Mervine was placed in command of Experiment.

From mid-1832 until mid-1833, Experiment cruised the Atlantic coast between Boston, Massachusetts, and Charleston, South Carolina. After undergoing repairs at Norfolk, Virginia, she sailed for the West Indies, returning to New York City in June 1835. During the remaining three years of her service, Experiment was often used for surveying. From 1839 to 1848, when she was sold, she as a receiving ship at Philadelphia, Pennsylvania.

The following is a relevant observation about the schooner USS Experiment and its seaworthiness from the historical book, Evils and Abuses in the Naval and Merchant Service Exposed, 1838, pages 10 & 11. As quoted from the author William McNally, fromerly of the US Navy.

"A new idea entered into the head of the secretary or the navy commissioners, (which I know not.) The latter had tried several experiments, such as building the U. S. schooner Experiment, and being so successful in that thought that they must try another on the pay of the petty officers." "To prevent being misunderstood by the reader, I have a word to say in relation to the U. S. schooner Experiment. She was built at Washington, under the eyes of the board of commissioners and secretary of the navy, upon an entire new plan. The use of knees and timbers was voted superfluous, and she was to have none. The use of oakum was ditto, and to encourage home produce, she was caulked with cotton and pegs. No grog was to be served to her crew, which was the only good experiment of the whole ; but as they had hit on a good experiment there, it was soon fell through, and grog was served to the crew. Her model was entirely different from all other vessels that I have ever seen. She much resembled that useful article known amongst seamen by the title of serving mallet, by which name she was well known on the West India station. The first mishap that she met with was, in firing a salute on her arrival at Norfolk, Va. The concussion shook her so that the cotton and pegs started from her sides, and she had to be caulked with oakum, to the manifest injury of the cotton planters. I do not remember how many days she was on her passage to Pensacola, but she made a passage from Havana to that port in twenty-five days. A washing tub would have made it in a shorter time, but she w^as an experiment. Yet she was not a dead loss to the good people of the United States, fop in consequence of her unfitness to cruise about on the ocean she was kept laying in Pensacola, and saved the expense of rigging a flag-staff at the commander's house to hoist his broad pendant on when the rest of the squadron were on a cruise. When she wanted a supply of beef, bread, or wood, she would go as far as the navy yard, which was an occurrence always duly noted in the Pensacola Gazette, and a superannuated land crab would have beat her on the race from the navy yard to the town. The Experiment was finally sent home, and on the passage she proved that she had one good quality, at least, she lost her rudder while laying to in a gale, and none were aware of the fact until it abated. The Experiment was so admirably constructed that she lay to, broad side on, like a crabb, as well without as with a rudder. Every naval officer has reason to be proud that she never was exhibited in any foreign port but Havana, so that few are aware of her existence. She is now employed on the survey of the coast, and may answer for that purpose, if for no other. But to resume."
