= USS Sebago =

Gunboat of the United States Navy

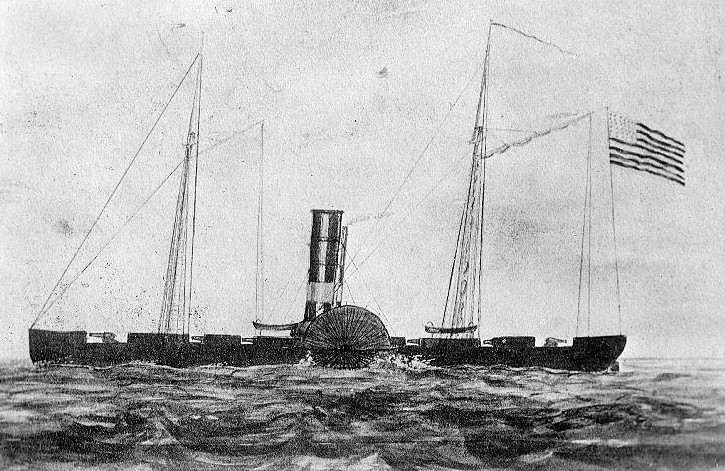
- USS Sebago, 1862

History

United States
- Name: USS Sebago
- Laid down: date unknown
- Launched: by Portsmouth Navy Yard; 30 November 1861
- Commissioned: 26 March 1862
- Decommissioned: 29 July 1865; at New York City
- Stricken: 1867 (est.)
- Fate: Sold, 19 January 1867

General characteristics
- Type: Double-ended gunboat
- Displacement: 832 long tons (845 t)
- Length: 228 ft 2 in (69.55 m)
- Beam: 33 ft 10 in (10.31 m)
- Draft: 9 ft 3 in (2.82 m)
- Depth of hold: 11 ft 8 in (3.56 m)
- Propulsion: 1 × 590 IHP, 44-inch bore by 7 ft stroke inclined direct-acting steam engine; sidewheels
- Speed: Unknown
- Complement: 156
- Armament: 1 × 100-pounder Parrott rifle, 1 × 9 in (230 mm) Dahlgren gun smoothbore, 4 × 24-pounder howitzers

USS Sebago was a large (832 long tons (845 t)) steamer with very powerful guns and four howitzers, purchased by the Union Navy during the beginning of the American Civil War.

With her large crew of 156 sailors, she served the Union Navy during the blockade of ports and waterways of the Confederate States of America as a gunboat.

== Built by the Portsmouth Navy Yard in 1861 ==
Sebago — a double-ended, sidewheel gunboat built by the Portsmouth Navy Yard, Kittery, Maine — was launched on 30 November 1861; and commissioned on 26 March 1862, Lieutenant Edmund W. Henry in command.

== Civil war service ==
=== Assigned to the North Atlantic blockade ===
Sebago departed Portsmouth, New Hampshire on 6 April 1862 and headed for Hampton Roads, Virginia, to join the North Atlantic Blockading Squadron and reached Newport News, Virginia on the 11th.

She was ordered to the York River to support General George B. McClellan's push up the peninsula toward Richmond, Virginia, and operated in that river and its tributaries supporting Union Army operations.

Then, on 30 June, after General Robert E. Lee had defeated McClellan in the Seven Days campaign and had driven the Army of the Potomac from the York to the James River, Sebago steamed downstream, rounded Old Point Comfort, and ascended the James escorting Army transports.

=== Reassigned to the South Atlantic blockade ===
Transferred to the South Atlantic Blockading Squadron later that month, Sebago departed Hampton Roads on 25 July and arrived off Charleston, South Carolina, on the 29th to begin a year of blockade duty off the approaches to that important and historic Southern port.

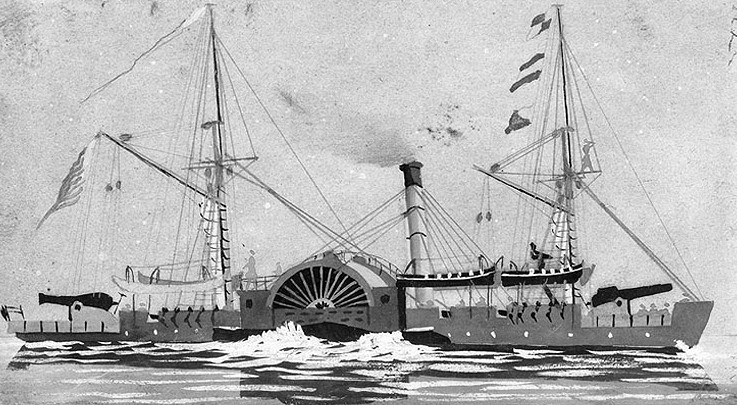
USS Sebago, 1862

On 18 June 1863, the double ender ran aground in Wassaw Sound and suffered some damage. As she was due for an overhaul, she sailed north on 29 July and was decommissioned at the New York Navy Yard on 9 July.

=== Reassigned to the Gulf of Mexico ===
Repairs and overhaul completed, Sebago was recommissioned on 2 December and sailed for the Gulf of Mexico for duty in the West Gulf Blockading Squadron in which she served through the end of the Civil War.

The highlight of her operations in the gulf came on 5 August 1864, when she participated in the Battle of Mobile Bay.

== Post-war deactivation ==
After peace returned, Sebago sailed north and was decommissioned at the New York Navy Yard on 29 July 1865. She was sold at New York City on 19 January 1867.
