= Engineers Club =

Engineers Club or Engineers' Club may refer to the following:

- Engineers Club of Dayton, Dayton, Ohio
- Engineers' Club of Saint Louis, St. Louis, Missouri
- Engineers' Club Building, Manhattan, New York

== See also ==
- Engineers Country Club
