= William Paul Gerhard =

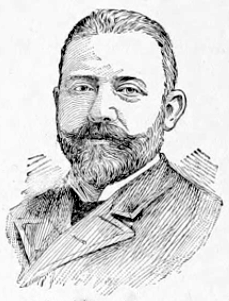
- Born: July 30, 1854; Hamburg
- Died: July 8, 1927 (aged 72); Scarsdale, New York
- Education: Technical University of Karlsruhe
- Occupation: Sanitary engineer

William Paul Gerhard (July 30, 1854 – July 8, 1927) was a German-American sanitary engineer.

== Early life and education ==
William Paul Gerhard was born in Hamburg, then a free city, on July 30, 1854. He was educated in Alexandria, Egypt, and later on in a gymnasium in Kiel, Germany. He graduated as a civil engineer from the Technical University of Karlsruhe, Baden, in 1875, and served as a volunteer in the Prussian Railroad Regiment, 1875–76, Berlin.

== Career ==
He came to the United States in September 1877. He worked under Colonel Henry Flad and under Captain James B. Eads in Saint Louis, 1877–80. He assisted the latter in the preparation of the plates for the History of the St. Louis Bridge. He became chief assistant engineer to Col. George E. Waring, Jr. at Newport, Rhode Island, 1881–83.

Gerhard then moved to New York City, where for two years he was chief engineer of the Durham House-Drainage Company, and afterward he had a practise as a civil engineer, devoting himself particularly to the sanitation of buildings and towns. Gerhard was editor of Building, an architectural journal, 1885–86, and served as consulting sanitary engineer on staff of New York State architects. He was United States delegate to First International Conference on Public Baths at The Hague, 1910. He was member of technical societies in the United States and Germany, and received an honorary degree of doctor of civil engineering from Technical University of Darmstadt in 1911.

== Death ==
He died at his home in Scarsdale, New York on July 8, 1927.

== Works ==
Gerhard was author of numerous American works on sanitation, house drainage, water supply, fire protection and gas lighting. He also published three German works. Among his larger works are:

- Anlagen von Haus-Entwässerungen (Berlin, 1880)
- Diagram for Sewer Calculations (London and New York, 1882)
- House-Drainage and Sanitary Plumbing (New York, 1883)
- Hints on the Drainage and Sewerage of Dwellings (1884)
- Sanitary Questions (1884)
- Prinzipien der Haus-Kanalization (Leipzig, 1885)
- A Guide to Sanitary House-Inspection (New York, 1885)
- The Prevention of Fire (1886)
- Notes embodying the Recent Practice in Sanitary Drainage of Buildings (1887)
- Domestic Sanitary Appliances (Springfield, 1887)
- The Disposal of Household Wastes (1887)
