= List of Engineer Regiments of the Union Army =

Civil War Engineer Regiments

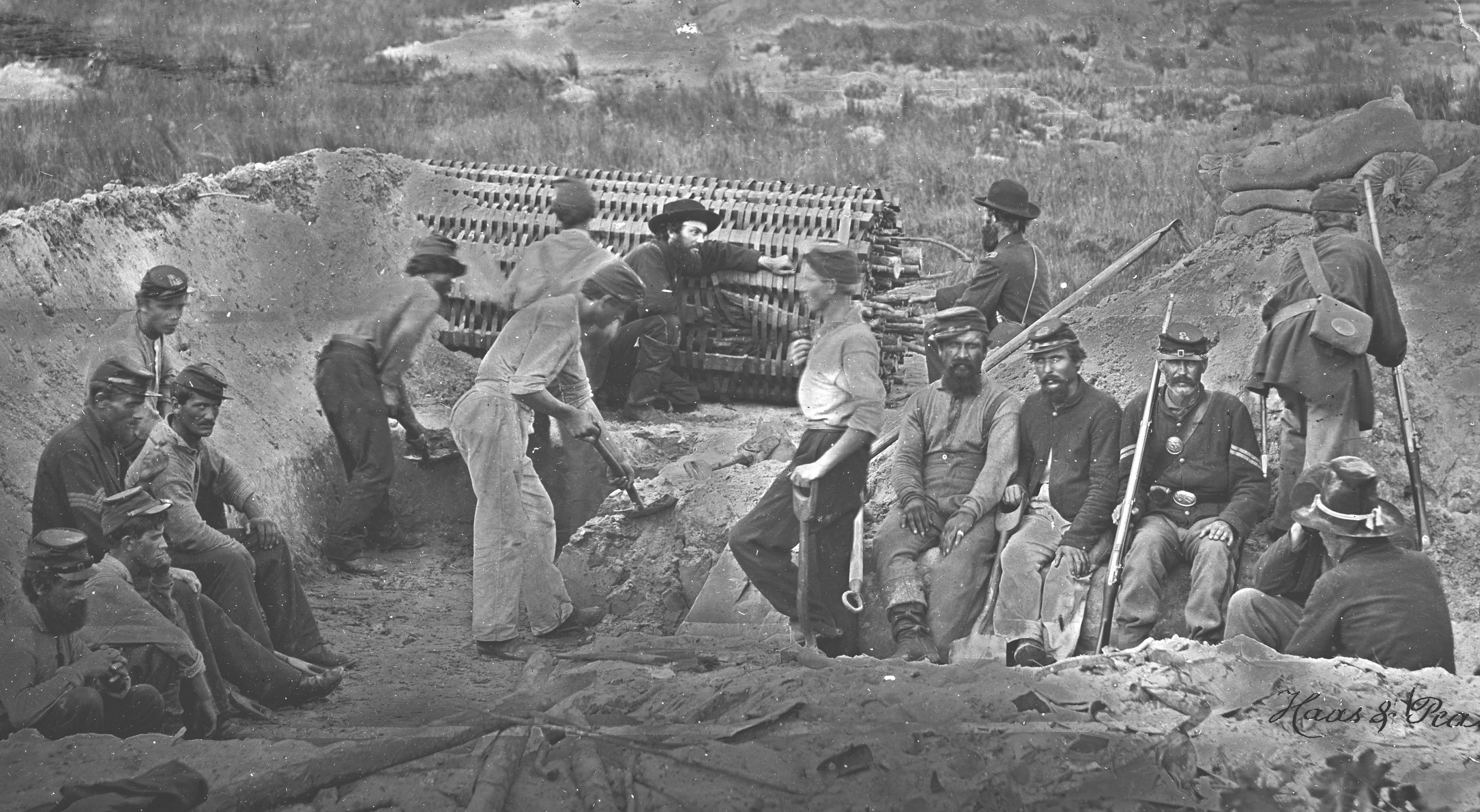

Engineer Regiments were a key aspect of the Union army during the American Civil War. The duties engineer regiments during the American Civil War included destroying and building transportation networks, erecting defensive and offensive emplacements, and providing situational intelligence. Though federally organized engineer units existed, the vast majority of engineer units and regiments, were volunteers from civilian engineering fields. Within the Union army, there were 12 engineering regiments, of which, 11 regiments were volunteer regiments. Notable engineer regiments include the decorated 1st New York Volunteer Engineer Regiment and the 1st Regiment of Louisiana Engineers (an all African-American regiment).

This symbolizes that this unit was formed under federal decree

<List of Engineer regiments of the Union Army>
Regiment	Alternative Name	Army of Service	Date Established	Date Disbanded	Service Term
1st Engineer Regiment			December 1861	1865	
1st Veteran Volunteer Engineer Regiment		Army of the Cumberland	August 30,1864	December 1865	3 years
1st New York Volunteer Engineer Regiment	"Serrell's Engineers"	Army of the James	October 11, 1861	June 30, 1865	3 years
15th New York Volunteer Engineer Regiment	"Sappers and Miners"	Army of the Potomac	May 9, 1861	July 2, 1865	2 years
50th New York Volunteer Engineer Regiment	"Stuart's Engineers"	Army of the Potomac	October 22, 1861	June 14, 1865	3 years
1st Michigan Engineers and Mechanics Regiment		Army of the Ohio	October 1, 1861	September 22, 1865	3 years
Bissell's Engineer Regiment	"Engineer Regiment of the West"	Army of the Mississippi	August 5, 1861	February 17, 1864	3 years
1st Missouri Engineer Regiment	"Engineer Regiment of the West"	Department of the Cumberland; Military Division of the Mississippi	February 17, 1864	July 22, 1865	
1st Regiment of Louisiana Engineers	"1st Engineer Corps d'Afrique"	Department of the Gulf (95th & 99th Infantry)	June 1863	June 1865	3 years
2nd Regiment of Louisiana Engineers	"2nd Engineer Corps d'Afrique"	Department of the Gulf (95th & 99th Infantry)	August 1863	June 1865	3 years
3rd Regiment of Louisiana Engineers	"3rd Engineer Corps d'Afrique"	Department of the Gulf (95th & 99th Infantry)	August 1863	June 1865	3 years
4th Regiment of Louisiana Engineers	"4th Engineer Corps d'Afrique"	Department of the Gulf (95th & 99th Infantry)	December 31, 1863	June 1865	3 years
5th Regiment of Louisiana Engineers	"5th Engineer Corps d'Afrique"	Department of the Gulf (95th & 99th Infantry)	Spring 1864	June 1865	3 years

== See also ==
- List of New York Civil War regiments
- 1st Michigan Engineers and Mechanics Regiment
- 1st New York Volunteer Engineer Regiment
