= 28th New York Infantry Regiment =

American military unit

- Active: May 22, 1861, to June 2, 1863
- Country: United States
- Allegiance: Union
- Branch: Infantry
- Engagements: Battle of Winchester; Battle of Cedar Mountain; Second Battle of Bull Run; Battle of Antietam; Battle of Chancellorsville

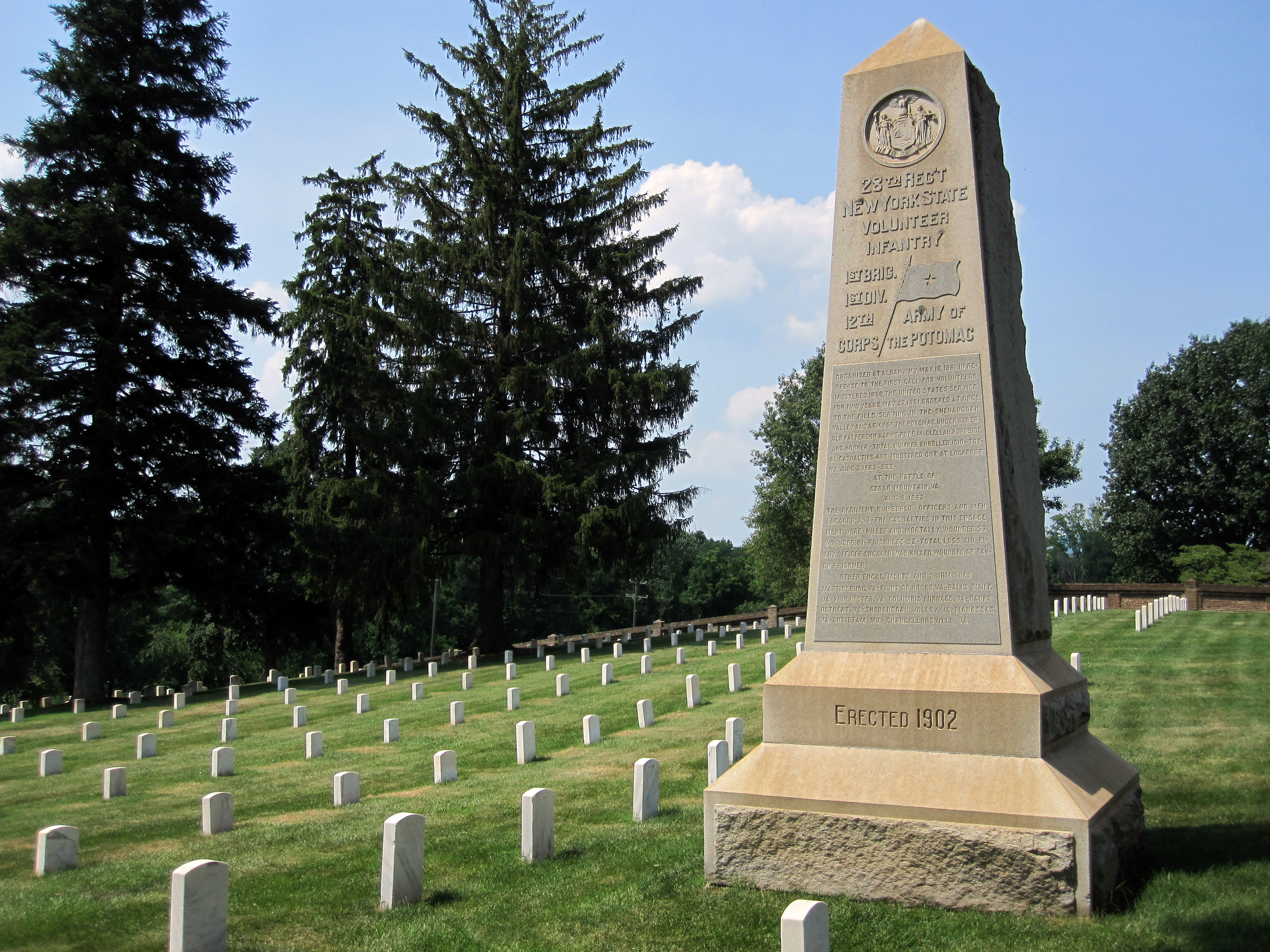
28th New York Volunteer Infantry Memorial at Culpeper National Cemetery, 1902

The 28th New York Infantry Regiment, the "Niagara Rifles" or "Scott Life Guard", was an infantry regiment that served in the Union Army during the American Civil War.

== Service ==
The regiment was organized in Albany, New York, and was mustered in for a two-year enlistment on May 22, 1861.

The regiment sailed aboard the steamship Star of the South from New York Harbor for Washington, D.C., on May 2, 1861. It arrived there four days later after a brief stop in Annapolis, Maryland.

The regiment was mustered out of service on June 2, 1863, and those men who had signed three-year enlistments or re-enlisted were transferred to the 60th New York.

== Total strength and casualties ==
The regiment suffered 2 officers and 46 enlisted men who were killed in action or mortally wounded, and 50 enlisted men who died of disease, for a total of 98 fatalities. Private Isaac Sly of Lockport was the first man killed in this regiment. He was shot in the skirmish near Martinsburg on July 11, 1861.

== Commanders ==
- Colonel Dudley Donnelly Until Killed at the Battle of Cedar Mountain, August 9, 1862
- Lieutenant Colonel Colonel Edwin Franklin Brown as Lieutenant Colonel He Served until August 9 at Cedar mountain Until wounded, which saw his arm Amputated, then while in the hospital He was Captured Exchanged In October 1862 then he resumed command as Newly Promoted Colonel to the unit Mustered out.
- Captain William H. H. Mapes Commanded the Regiment at Antietam, The unit had about 65 men in it at the time.

== See also ==
- List of New York Civil War regiments
