= Josiah W. Bissell =

Union soldier during American Civil War

- Born: Josiah Wolcott Bissell; May 12, 1818; Rochester, New York, US
- Died: November 30, 1891 (aged 73) Pittsburgh, Pennsylvania, US
- Buried: Mount Hope Cemetery
- Allegiance: (Union (American Civil War)) Union
- Branch: Union Army
- Service years: 1861–1863
- Rank: Colonel
- Commands: Engineer Regiment of the West
- Conflicts: American Civil War: Battle of Island Number Ten; Siege of Corinth; Vicksburg Campaign
- Spouse: Julia Wolcott Hooker

Col. Josiah Wolcott Bissell (May 12, 1818 – November 30, 1891) was a Union Army officer during the American Civil War that commanded the Engineer Regiment of the West.

== Biography ==
Bissell was born in Rochester, New York on May 12, 1818, to a man of the same name who was an early settler of Rochester.

Before the onset of the American Civil War, Bissell worked in banking as well as architectural engineering. He married Julia Wolcott Hooker, a descendent of Thomas Hooker, who was also from Rochester, on July 12, 1844.

On May 28, 1861, Bissell was made colonel and would come to lead what would be known as the Engineer Regiment of the West. He had proposed the idea of the regiment to Major General John C. Frémont in July 1861 in response to the lack of engineers and mechanics in the western theater.

During the war, Bissell's regiment would get attached to Gen. Pope's army as well as work along the Mississippi river, even superintending the construction of the canal that allowed Union gunboats to enter the Battle of Island Number Ten.

Despite receiving numerous accolades and participating in both the Siege of Corinth and the Vicksburg Campaign, Bissell's nomination to the rank of Brigadier General in April 1862 was tabled by the U.S. Senate. His subordinates described his manner as tyrannical and superiors, such as then Major General Ulysses S. Grant who believed he leaked information to the Memphis Press in April 1863, disliked Bissell. Rather than receiving a promotion, he was the target of several unproven charges.

In 1863, with the threat of an insubordination charge and dishonorable discharge looming over him, Bissell submitted his resignation, in protest of what he considered was mistreatment by his superiors, which was accepted June 2 of that year.

Bissell moved to Cincinnati following the war, later settling in Boston.

Bissell died in Pittsburgh, Pennsylvania, on November 30, 1891. He was buried in Mount Hope Cemetery.
