= 1st Michigan Engineers and Mechanics Regiment =

- Michigan state flag
- Active: October 29, 1861, to September 22, 1865
- Country: United States
- Allegiance: Union
- Branch: Engineer
- Engagements: Battle of Mill Springs (Companies D, F, G); Siege of Corinth; Battle of Perryville; Battle of Stones River; Chattanooga campaign Atlanta campaign March to the Sea; Battle of Bentonville

The 1st Michigan Engineers and Mechanics Regiment was an engineer regiment that served in the Union Army during the American Civil War. There were only ten other similar regiments in the Union Army. The Michigan unit was one of three engineering regiments raised in 1861, the other two being Missouri (August 1861) and New York (September 1861). Engineering regiments are often left off of many Order of Battles, but their contribution to campaigns were vital from a logistics point of view; repairing/building railroads, bridges and blockhouses; and destroying enemy communication lines, railroads and bridges. Engineering units like the First Michigan were often caught up in attacks from enemy guerrillas and cavalry skirmishes.

== Service ==
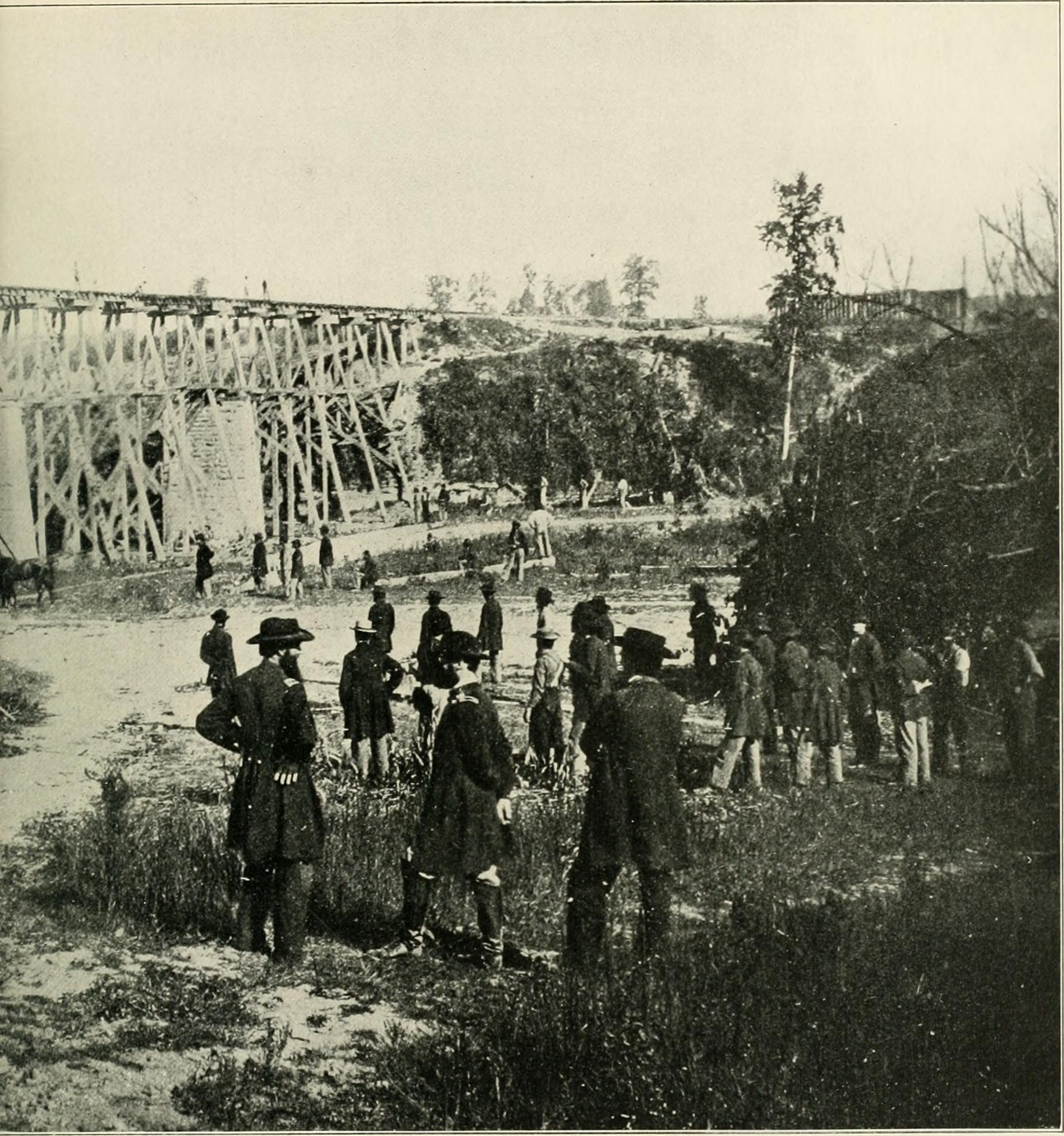
Engineers and infantry busy at the Elk River Bridge, Tennessee, providing rail passage for the Union troops

The 1st Michigan Engineers was organized at Marshall, Michigan and mustered into service on October 29, 1861. They rendezvoused at Camp Owen on the Calhoun County fairgrounds in early October.

The regiment was mustered out on September 22, 1865.

== Total strength and casualties ==
Over its existence, the regiment carried a total of 2962 men on its muster rolls. The regiment lost 1 officer and 12 enlisted men killed in action or mortally wounded, and 351 enlisted men who died of disease, for a total of 364 fatalities.

At the Battle of Perryville (October 1862), the First Michigan had at least ten wounded and one missing. At Lavergne, Tennessee; just prior to the Battle of Murfreesboro, the First Michigan had one killed, five wounded, four POWs and one missing. The 1st Michigan saw two men killed, nine wounded, and two missing at the Battle of Murfreesboro (early January 1863). The unit was active all over middle Tennessee, including Columbia, Spring Hill, Franklin, Brentwood and Nashville from 1862 - 1864, building and repairing railroads, bridges, blockhouses, etc. The Franklin-Nashville Campaign was costly to the First Michigan Engineers, losing over 30 men as POWs.

The unit also participated in Sherman's March to the Sea and at the Battle of Bentonville. Under Sherman's orders, the unit destroyed the Fayetteville Arsenal.

== Commanders ==
- Colonel William Power Innes, September 12, 1861, to October 26, 1864
- Colonel John B. Yates, November 3, 1864, to September 22, 1865

== Commemoration ==
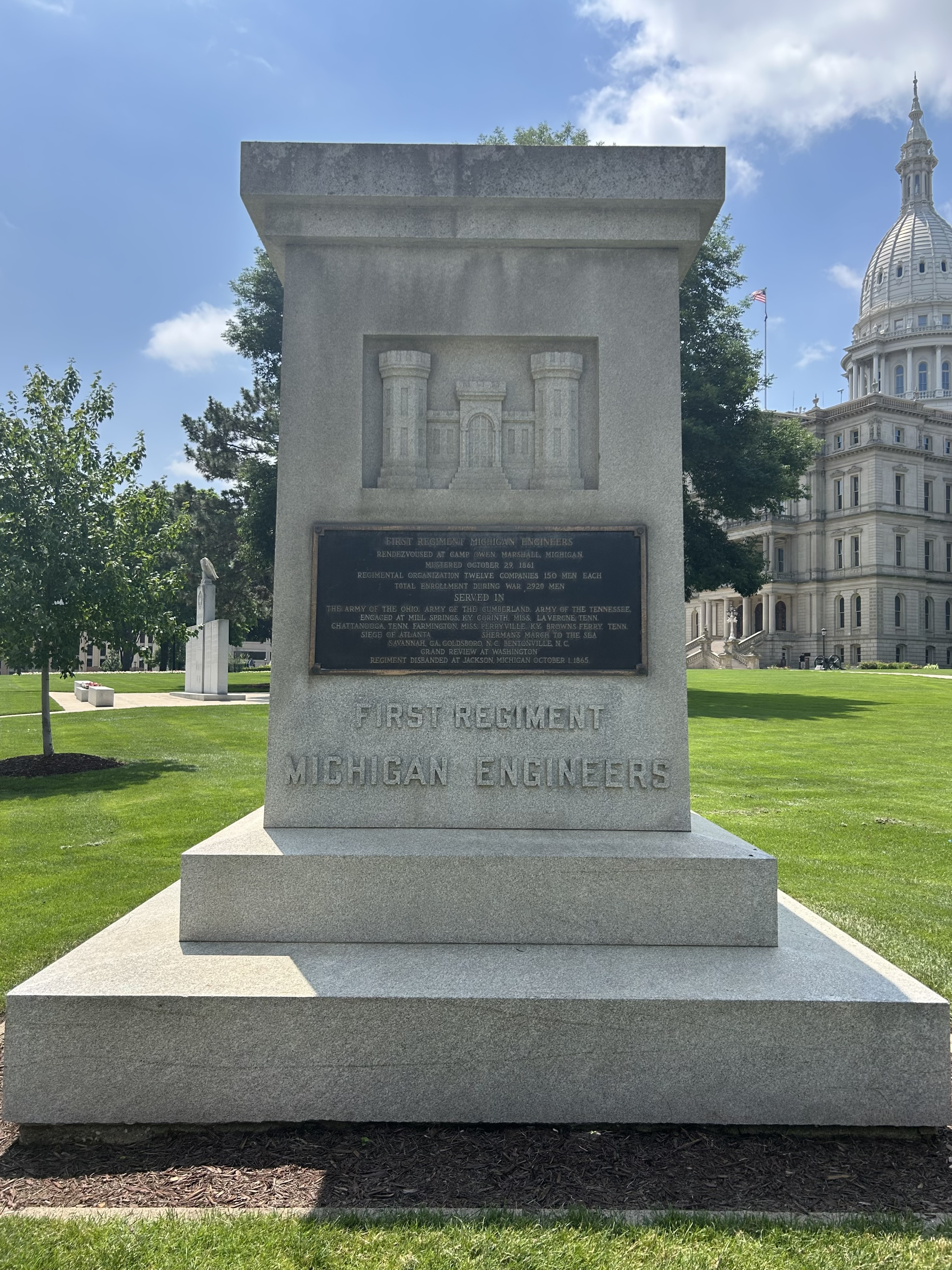
Front of Monument with Capitol building visible in background

A monument honoring the 1st Michigan Engineers and Mechanics Regiment was dedicated on October 12, 1912, in Lansing, Michigan. Located near the Michigan State Capitol building on the corner of North Capitol Avenue and Ottawa Street, the monument is made of granite with a concrete base and stands about 10 feet tall. It was funded by surviving members of the regiment, their friends and family, and the city of Lansing. There are four plaques (one on each side of the monument) that list important dates, locations, and the names of those who served.

== See also ==
- List of Michigan Civil War Units
- Michigan in the American Civil War
- List of Engineer Regiments of the Union Army
