= Bissell's Engineer Regiment =

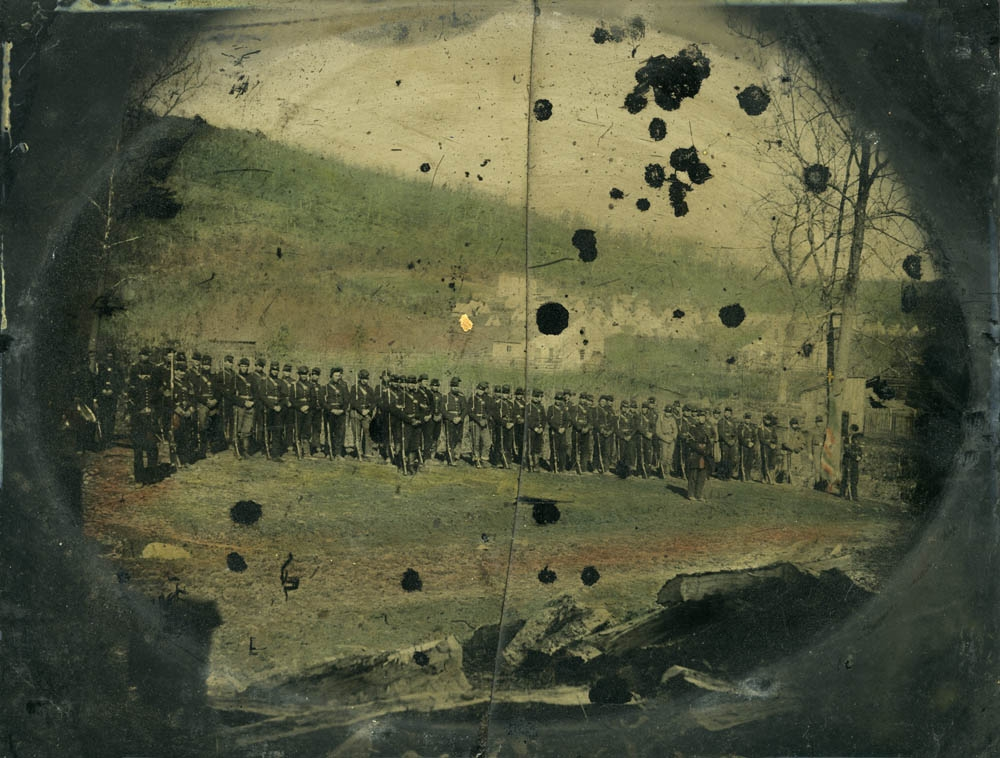
- Bissell’s Engineer Regiment of the West stands in formation
- Active: August 5, 1861 to February 17, 1864
- Country: United States
- Allegiance: United States of America; Union
- Branch: Engineers
- Nickname(s): Engineer Regiment of the West
- Engagements: Battle of New Madrid; Skirmish at Mt. Pleasant; Battle of Island Number Ten; Construction of New Madrid Canal; Expedition to Ft. Pillow; Siege of Corinth; Battle of Tuscumbia Creek; Repair of Mobile and Ohio Railroad; Wrecking Expedition on Mississippi River; 2nd Battle of Corinth; Grant's Mississippi Central Campaign; Siege and Battle of Vicksburg

Commanders
- Notable commanders: Col. J. W. Bissell; Col. Henry Flad

Bissell's Engineer Regiment, also known as Bissell's Engineer Regiment of the West, was an engineer regiment that served in the Union Army during the American Civil War.

== Service ==
Organized at St. Louis, Mo. Company "A" mustered in on July 10, 1861. Company "B" organized at Paris, Edgar County, Ill., and mustered in at St. Louis August 5, 1861. Company "C" organized at Prairie City, Ill., and mustered in at St. Louis August 19. Company "D" organized at St. Louis and mustered in on October 31, 1861. Company "E" organized at Adrian, Mich., and mustered in at St. Louis August 23, 1861. Company "F" organized at Dubuque, Iowa, and mustered in on October 31, 1861. Company "G" organized at Cape Girardeau, Mo., and mustered in on September 17, 1861. Company "H" organized at Paris, Ill., and mustered in on October 31, 1861. Company "I" organized in Iowa and mustered in on October 31, 1861, at St. Louis, Mo. Company "K" organized at Burlington, Iowa, and mustered in at St. Louis, Mo., October 31, 1861.

Attached to Department of Missouri to March, 1862. Unattached, Army of the Mississippi, to June, 1862. Engineer Brigade, District of West Tennessee, Dept. of the Tennessee, to July, 1862. District of Columbus, Ky., to December, 1862. District of Columbus, Ky., 13th Army Corps (Old), Dept. of the Tennessee, to January, 1863. Unattached, Engineers' Dept. of the Tennessee, to February, 1864.

== Detailed Service ==
Companies "A" and "B" ordered to East St. Louis, Mo., August 6, 1861; thence to Cape Girardeau, Mo., August 6–7, and fatigue duty there until March, 1862, when rejoined Regiment at New Madrid, Mo. Built Forts "A," "B," "C" and "D," Defenses of Cape Girardeau. Company "G" also at Cape Girardeau and Bird's Point, Mo., until March, 1862, rejoining Regiment March 8. Regiment moved from St. Louis, Mo., to Lamine Bridge, on Missouri Pacific Railroad, September 19, 1861, and duty there until October 26. Moved to Sedalia, Mo., and duty there until December 11. Moved to Georgetown, thence to Otterville, Mo., December 11–19, and duty there until March, 1862. (Co. "I" at Sedalia until January, 1862, rejoining Regiment January 29. Co. "F" near Sedalia until February, 1862, rejoining Regiment February 7.)

Moved to St. Louis, Mo., thence to Commerce, Mo., March 1–5. Siege operations against New Madrid March 8–15. Engaged near Mr. Pleasant March 3 (Cos. "A" and "B"). Operations against Island No. 10 March 15-April 8. (Constructed New Madrid Canal, allowing passage of Gunboats through swamps of New Madrid to rear of Island No. 10.) Expedition to Fort Pillow, Tenn., April 12–14. Moved to Hamburg, Tenn., April 14–22. Cos. "A" and "I" detached at New Madrid until May 4, rejoining before Corinth, Miss., May 8. Advance on and siege of Corinth, Miss., April 26-May 30. Occupation of Corinth and pursuit to Tiptonville May 30-June 6. Tuscumbia Creek May 31-June 1. Repair Mobile & Ohio Railroad to Columbia. Headquarters at Jackson until October, 1862. Wrecking Expedition on Mississippi River about Mr. Pleasant, Island No. 10 and New Madrid July 21-October 20 (Detached). Battle of Corinth, Miss., October 3–4 (Detachment of Co. "E"). Regiment moved to defense of Corinth October 3. Pursuit to Ripley, Miss., October 5–12 (Detachment). Regiment return to Jackson and duty there until November 6.

Grant's Central Mississippi Campaign November, 1862, to January, 1863. Duty on Memphis & Charleston Railroad at Lagrange, Obion River and at Memphis, Tenn., until February, 1863. Moved to Young's Point, La., February 11–14, thence to Lake Providence, La. Operations against Vicksburg, Miss., February to July. Engineer operations at Baxter's Bayou and Bayou Macon constructing Batteries at Young's Point, and various expeditions to explore and open Bayous until April, 1863. 6 Companies ordered to Memphis, Tenn., April 1–6. Engaged in opening Memphis & Charleston Railroad to Corinth, Miss., then at Pocahontas May 11 to October 3. Repairing Memphis & Charleston Railroad east of Corinth, Miss., October 3–28. At Iuka and Corinth constructing works until December 26. Moved to Memphis, thence to Nashville, Tenn., December 26, 1863, to January 4, 1864. Cos. "A," "D," "F" and "I" at Duckport, La. Engaged in fatigue duty in that vicinity until April 30. Building drain at Richmond, La., until May 9. Moved to Milliken's Bend May 9; duty there and at Young's Point and Chickasaw Bayou until May 25. Moved to Haines' Bluff and building fortifications until July 1. Surrender of Vicksburg July 4. Duty at Vicksburg until January 15, 1864. Ordered to Nashville, Tenn., and rejoin Regiment February 2, 1864. Consolidated with 25th Missouri infantry to form the 1st Regiment Missouri Volunteer Engineers on February 17, 1864.

== Casualties ==
The regiment lost during service 16 Enlisted men killed and mortally wounded and 1 Officer and 146 Enlisted men by disease; for a total of 163. (This figure includes the casualties suffered by the "Engineers" after it was converted into the "1st Missouri Engineers".)

== Commanders ==
- Colonel J. W. Bissell (resigned, June 1863)
- Colonel Henry Flad

== See also ==
- Missouri Civil War Union units
- List of Engineer Regiments of the Union Army

== Notes and references ==
- Dyer, Frederick H. (1908). A Compendium of the War of the Rebellion. Des Moines, Iowa: Dyer Publishing Co. p. 1320.
- Neal, W.A., An Illustrated History of the Missouri Engineer and 25th Infantry Regiments, Chicago, Donohue and Henneberry, 1889
