= 9th Maine Infantry Regiment =

- Active: September 22, 1861, to July 13, 1865
- Country: United States
- Allegiance: Union
- Branch: Infantry
- Engagements: First Battle of Fort Wagner; Second Battle of Fort Wagner; Battle of Drewry's Bluff; Battle of Cold Harbor; Second Battle of Petersburg; Siege of Petersburg; Battle of the Crater; Second Battle of Deep Bottom; Battle of Chaffin's Farm; Battle of Fair Oaks & Darbytown Road; Carolinas campaign; Battle of Wilmington

The 9th Maine Infantry Regiment was an infantry regiment that served in the Union Army during the American Civil War.

== Service ==
The 9th Maine Infantry was organized in Augusta, Maine, and mustered in for a three-year enlistment on September 22, 1861.

The regiment was attached to Wright's 3rd Brigade, Sherman's South Carolina Expeditionary Corps, to February 1862. Fernandina, Florida, Department of the South, to January 1863. District of Hilton Head, South Carolina, X Corps, Department of the South, to June 1863. St. Helena Island, South Carolina, to July 1863. 2nd Brigade, Folly Island, South Carolina, X Corps, July 1863. 2nd Brigade. Morris Island, South Carolina, X Corps, to August 1863. 1st Brigade, Morris Island, South Carolina, X Corps, to April 1864. 1st Brigade, 3rd Division, X Corps, Army of the James, Department of Virginia and North Carolina, to May 1864. 2nd Brigade, 3rd Division, XVIII Corps, to June 1864. 3rd Brigade, 2nd Division, X Corps, to December 1864. 3rd Brigade, 2nd Division, XXIV Corps, to March 1865. 3rd Brigade, 2nd Division, X Corps, Army of the Ohio, to July 1865.

The 9th Maine Infantry mustered out of service July 13, 1865.

== Detailed service ==
This regiment was raised at large and was organized at Augusta, Sept. 22, 1861, to serve three years. In less than two weeks from the arrival of the first company at Augusta, the 9th was on its way to Washington, with more than 1,000 men in its ranks. The original members (except veterans) numbering 158 men were mustered out of service Sept. 27, 1864, and the regiment composed of veterans and recruits, retained in service until July 13, 1865, when it was mustered out under orders from the war department. The 3rd company of unassigned infantry, organized Sept. 30, 1864, was assigned to this regiment as Co. K, and was mustered out June 30, 1865. Soon after its arrival in Washington (Sept. 26), the regiment was assigned to Gen. T. W. Sherman's expedition for the capture of Port Royal, S. C., and landed at Hilton Head, S. C., Nov. 8, 1861. On Feb. 7, 1862, it went to Warsaw island, off the coast of Georgia, and on the 21st, joined the expedition which captured Fernandina, Fla., being the first regiment to land from the transports and the first to take possession of the town. The regiment sailed to Fernandina aboard the steamship Star of the South The troops remained at Fernandina until Jan. 17, 1863, when it returned to Hilton Head, and on June 24 went to St. Helena island as part of a force under Gen. Strong for the assault on Morris island, S. C. July 4 it went to Folly island, and on the 10th landed on Morris island, where it carried the enemy's rifle pits in front of their works. The regiment formed a part of the assaulting forces in the attacks on Fort Wagner, July 11 and 18, and Sept. 6. Its casualties in the several assaults were over 300 men in killed, wounded and missing. The 9th continued at Black and Morris islands, S. C., until April 18, 1864. In the meantime 416 of the original members reenlisted for an additional term of three years. In the spring of 1864 it was transferred to the Army of the Potomac and arrived at Gloucester Point, Va., April 22, where the reenlisted men, who had been home on 30 day furlough, rejoined the regiment on the 28th. It sailed up the James River on May 4 to Bermuda Hundred, and from this time on saw much hard service at the front, participating in the following engagements: Drewry's Bluff, Bermuda Hundred, losing 52 men; Cold Harbor, where its loss was over 70 men; the assaults on Petersburg; Deep Bottom, Fort Gilmer, Darbytown Road, losing 48 men. Oct. 28, it went to Chaffin's Farm, and after the capture of Fort Fisher, N. C., in 1865, it was ordered there. Later it took possession of Wilmington, then joined Gen. Sherman's forces at Cox's bridge, after which it proceeded to Magnolia and from there to Raleigh, N. C., which city it entered April 11, 1865. It remained at Raleigh until July 13, 1865, when it was mustered out and proceeded to Augusta, Me., where the men were paid and finally discharged.

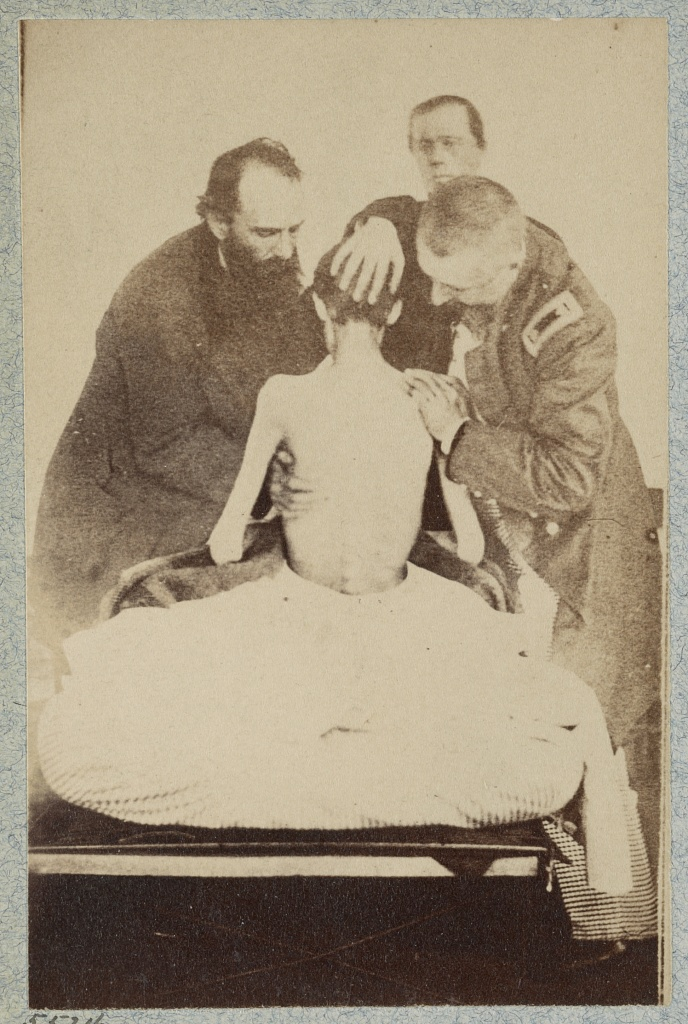
Private Isaiah G. Bowker of the 9th Maine, a former prisoner of war from Belle Isle, being treated at the U.S. General Hospital.

== Casualties ==
The regiment lost a total of 421 men during service; 10 officers and 172 enlisted men killed or mortally wounded, 3 officers and 236 enlisted men died of disease.

== Commanders of the 9th ME ==
- Col. Rishworth Rich
- Horatio Bisbee Jr.
- Sabine Emery
- Zina H. Robinson
- Col. George F. Granger
- Joseph Noble
- George B. Dyer

== See also ==
- List of Maine Civil War units
- Maine in the American Civil War
