= 1st Missouri Engineer Regiment =

- Active: February 17, 1864, to July 22, 1865
- Country: United States
- Allegiance: United States of America; Union
- Branch: Engineers
- Nickname: Engineer Regiment of the West
- Engagements: Reconstruction of Nashville and Western RR; Battle of Jonesborough; Battle of Lovejoy's Station; March to the Sea; Siege of Savannah; Carolinas campaign Salkahatchie Swamps; South Edisto River; North Edisto River; Battle of Columbia; Lynch's Creek; Battle of Bentonville; Advance on Raleigh

Commanders
- First Commander: Colonel Henry Flad

The 1st Missouri Engineer Regiment was an engineer regiment that served in the Union Army during the American Civil War.

== Service ==
Organized February 17, 1864, by consolidation of Bissell's Engineer Regiment of the West and 25th Missouri Infantry Regiment. Attached to Defenses of Nashville & Northwestern Railroad, Department of the Cumberland, to August 1864. Engineers Sherman's Army to July 1865.

== Detailed Service ==
Assigned to duty on line of Nashville & Western Railroad rebuilding road from Nashville to the Tennessee River February 18 to May 10, 1864; then on line of Nashville & Northwestern Railroad building blockhouses, repairing and protecting road until August 15. Ordered to Join Army in the field and march to the Chattahoochie River, Georgia, August 15–25. Flank movement on Jonesboro August 25–30. Battle of Jonesboro August 31-September 1. Lovejoy Station September 2–6. At Atlanta until November 15. March to the sea November 15-December 10. In charge of pontoons, Army of the Tennessee. Siege of Savannah December 10–21. Campaign of the Carolinas January to April 1865. Salkehatchie Swamps, S.C., February 2–5. South Edisto River February 9. North Edisto River February 12–13. Columbia February 15–17. Lynch's Creek February 26–27. Battle of Bentonville, N.C., March 19–21. Occupation of Goldsboro March 24-April 10. Advance on Raleigh April 10–14. Bennett's House April 26. Surrender of Johnston and his army. March to Washington, D.C., via Richmond, Va., April 29-May 20. Grand Review of the Armies, May 23.

== Sherman's Advance ==
The 1st Missouri Engineers figured largely in Sherman's March to the Sea and Carolinas Campaign. In addition to building roads and repairing railroads and bridges, the regiment provided "pontooneer" detachments which transported and constructed mobile temporary bridges which sped the movement of Sherman's units. Confederate General Joe Johnston paid tribute to the 1st Missouri (and Sherman's other engineers) when he said: "When I learned that Sherman’s army was marching through the Salk swamps, making its own corduroy roads at the rate of a dozen miles a day, I made up my mind that there had been no such army in existence since the days of Julius Caesar."

On September 27th 1864, several members of the Regiment were on a train at Centralia, Missouri, and were executed by a militia led by William T. Anderson. Sergeant Thomas Goodman was left the only survivor of his comrades.

== Casualties ==
The regiment lost during service 16 enlisted men killed or mortally wounded and 1 officer and 146 enlisted men by disease. Total 163. (This figure includes the casualties suffered by the "Bissell's Engineer Regiment of the West" before it was consolidated with the 25th Missouri Infantry to form the "1st Missouri Engineers".)

== Commanders ==
- Colonel Henry Flad

== See also ==
- Missouri Civil War Union units
- List of Engineer Regiments of the Union Army
