= 1st New York Engineer Regiment =

- Active: October 11, 1861, to June 30, 1865
- Country: United States
- Allegiance: United States of America; Union
- Branch: Engineers
- Nicknames: Serrell's Engineers, New York Volunteer Corps of Engineers, Engineer's and Artizans
- Engagements: Battle of Fort Pulaski; Battle of James Island; First Battle of Fort Wagner; Second Battle of Fort Wagner; Second Battle of Charleston Harbor; Second Battle of Fort Sumter; Battle of Olustee; Bermuda Hundred Campaign; Siege of Petersburg; Dutch Gap; Battle of Chaffin's Farm; Battle of Honey Hill

Commanders
- First Commander: Col. Edward W. Serrell
- Second Commander: Col. James F. Hall

Insignia
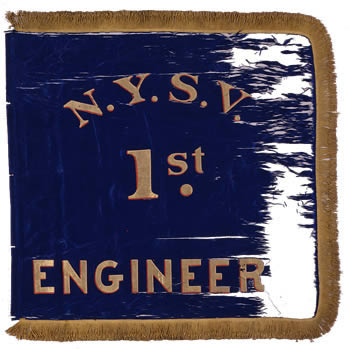
- Colors of the 1st NYVE

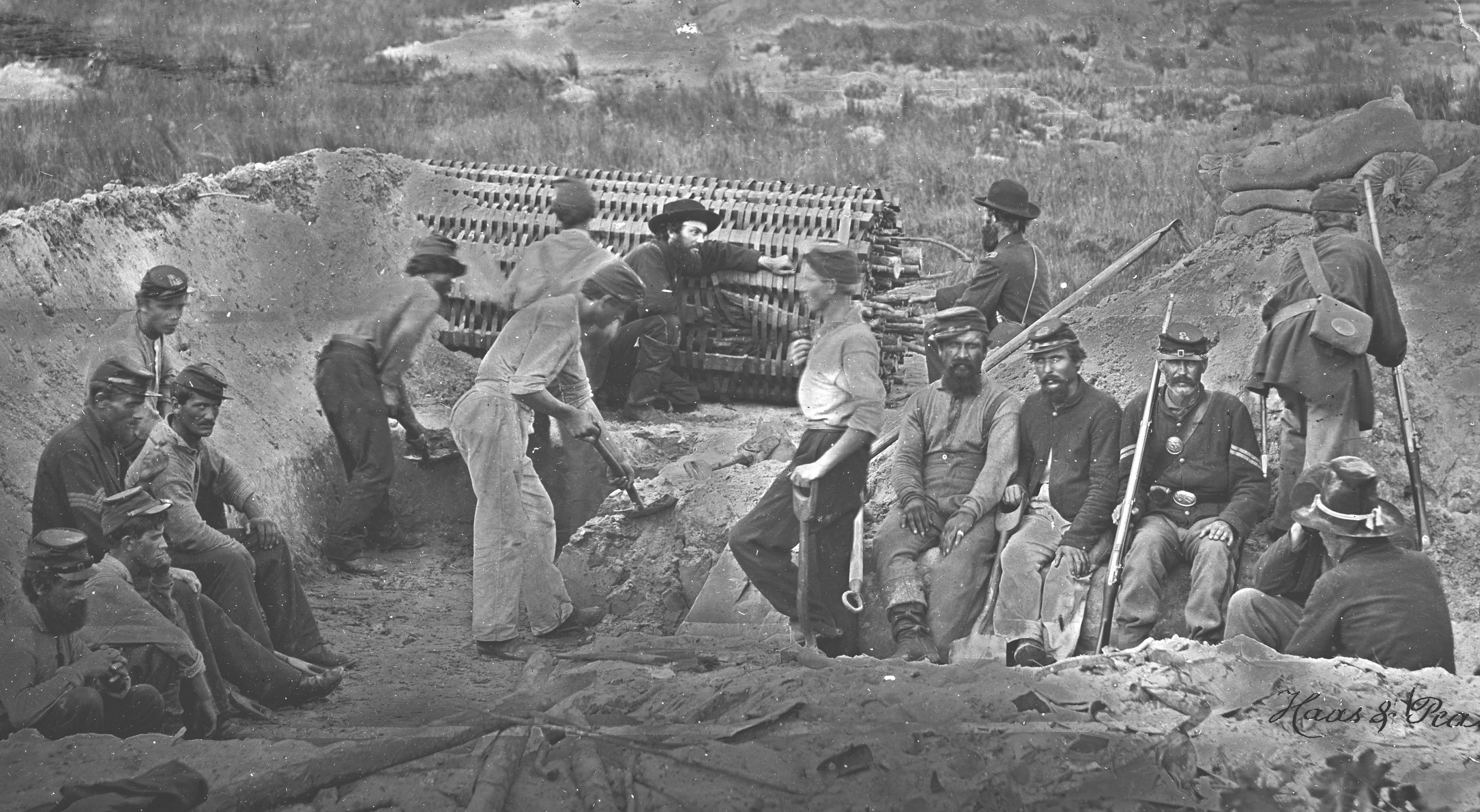
Staged photograph of the 1st NY Engineers demonstrating sapping on Morris Island.

The 1st New York Engineer Regiment was an engineer regiment that served in the Union Army during the American Civil War. It was also known as Serrell's Engineers, New York Volunteer Corps of Engineers, or Engineer's and Artizans. The regiment served initially in the Lower Seaboard Theater, and later in the Richmond–Petersburg Campaign.

== Organization and muster ==
In 1860 the army Corps of Engineers consisted of just 44 officers and 100 soldiers for an army of 15,000 soldiers. After the formation of the Confederacy and the Battle of Fort Sumter, Congress authorized a massive increase in the number of specialized engineer troops on August 3, 1861, to complement the growing Union Army. Edward W. Serrell, a prominent civil engineer obtained authorization to begin recruiting an engineer regiment which would become known as the 1st New York Volunteer Engineer Regiment, or Serrell's Engineers.

The regiment was accepted by the state on September 27, 1861. Serrell was appointed a Lieutenant Colonel of Volunteers on October 11, 1861, and promoted to a full Colonel by December of that year. The regiment was officially organized in New York City, and mustered in for a three-year enlistment on October 11, 1861.

Volunteers were recruited by company:

- Company A: New York City
- Company B: New York City
- Company C: Athens, Hudson, Cooperstown, Newark, and Pennsylvania
- Company D: New York City
- Company E: Kingston, PA, Newark, Sing Sing, Poughkeepsie, and Ulster County
- Company F: New York City, Brooklyn, Rochester, Canandaigua, and Newark
- Company G: New York City, Canandaigua, and Otsego County
- Company H: New York City
- Company I: New York City, Newburgh, Schuyler's Falls, Mooers, Goshen, Saranac, Piermont, Plattsburgh, Centerville, and Ellenburgh
- Company K: New Jersey at Newton, Dover, Paterson, Morristown, Stanhope, and Rockaway
- Company L: New York City
- Company M: New York City, Brooklyn, Tompkinsville, Kingston, and Tarrytown

Upon formation, the volunteer engineers were promised pay wages one-third greater than that of the line. After the unit had been mustered, the Paymaster General refused to recognize the status of the newly formed regiment, and paid them the same rate as infantry. After protests to the War Department failed to rectify the situation, the men refused to take their reduced pay. Finally, after eight months of refusing to accept the lower wages, the order finally came through to increase the soldiers' pay to the agreed amount.

== Department of the South ==
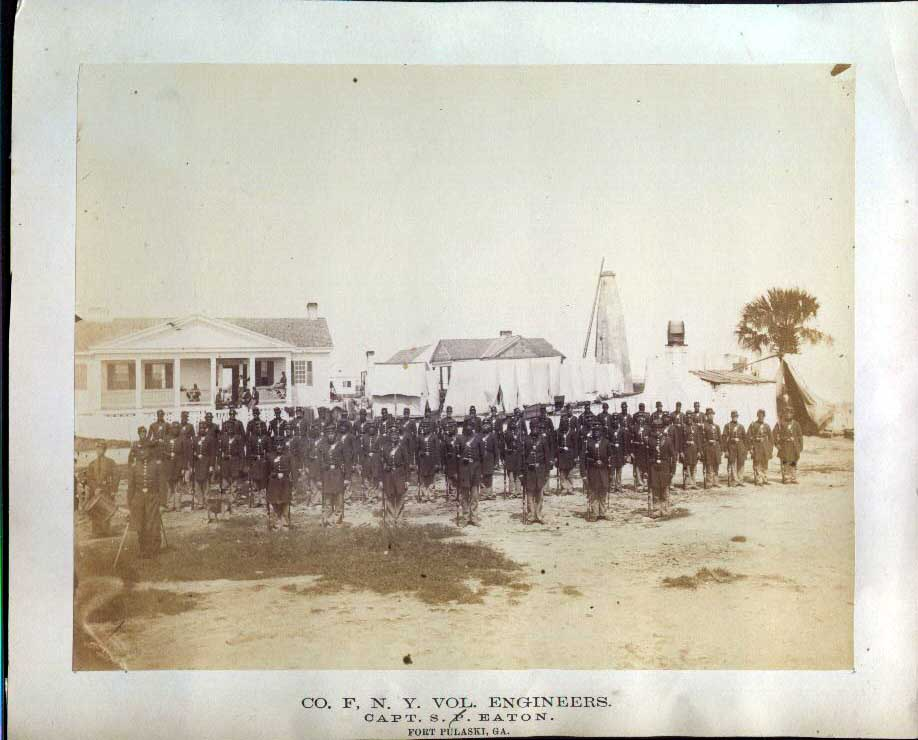
Company F, after the capture of Fort Pulaski in 1862

The 1st New York was deployed to Port Royal Sound and was formed as the 10th Corps Engineers in the Department of the South. The regiment sailed for Port Royal from New York Harbor on October 13, 1861, aboard the steamship Star of the South. The regiment distinguished itself in the Battle of Fort Pulaski, helping to capture the fort after 30 hours of bombardment, constructing batteries for the new James rifled cannon. The 1st New York was given the honor of having their regimental flag chosen as the first to float over Fort Pulaski after its capture. The regiment was employed throughout the east coast, from South Carolina to Florida.

While serving in the X Corps, the regiment was involved in capturing several key forts in Charleston Harbor. After the failed infantry assault on Fort Wagner which included the famous charge by the 54th Massachusetts Volunteer Infantry, retold in the climax of the feature film Glory, the 1st New York Engineers were tasked with conducting a traditional siege on the fort. After 60 days of shelling, the defenders abandoned the fort on September 7, 1863.

Using Morris Island as a staging area, the X Corps could focus on recapturing Fort Sumter, the site of the first military action of the Civil War. During the Battle of Fort Sumter, the 1st New York established watchtowers and built batteries in an attempt to pummel the fort into capitulation. However, in spite of a near constant bombardment, as well as a failed amphibious assault, Union forces were unable to occupy the fort until its abandonment by Confederate forces on February 17, 1865.

== The Marsh Battery and the Swamp Angel ==
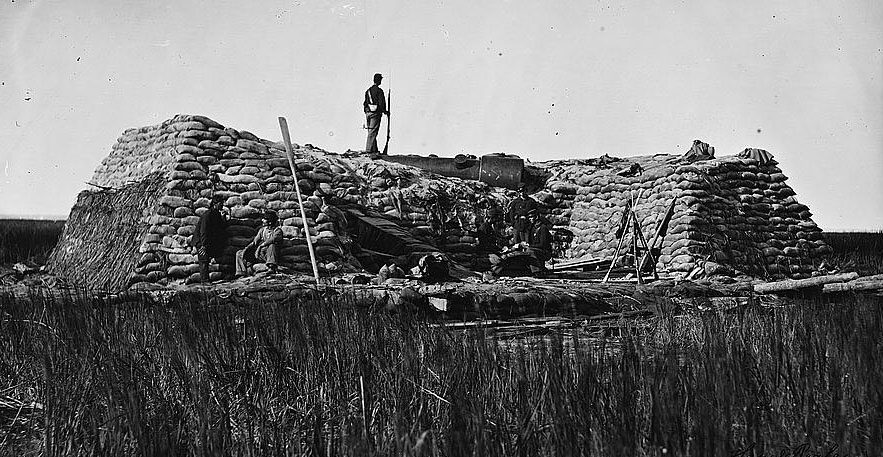
The famed Marsh Battery featuring the Swamp Angel, after it had misfired and exploded on August 22, 1863

Unable to recapture Fort Sumter, the X Corps under Gen. Quincy Adams Gillmore turned their attention to the nearby city of Charleston. Gillmore wanted to shell Charleston using Greek Fire to force its capitulation without capturing the harbor forts, so he instructed Serrell to explore the possibilities of constructing a battery in the marshes between James Island and Morris Island.

According to legend Serrell gave the duty to a young engineer who declared the project could not be done. Serrell told the doubting engineer that nothing was impossible, and to requisition any necessary materials. A short time later Serrell received a request for twenty men eighteen feet tall. At the same time there was a request to the department's surgeon to splice three six-foot men together to make the needed eighteen footers. The request did not amuse Serrell, and he soon replaced the young officer.

Serrell assumed personal responsibility and conducted a series of experiments to establish the capability of the soil to support weight. He believed the soil could be stabilized enough to receive the weight of a siege piece. A plan was presented to Gilmore for the construction of a battery on August 2, 1863. It was immediately accepted, and several days were spent setting up support activities to supply lumber and other materials. Construction began on 10 August.

The engineers built a rectangular frame of sheet piling that was driven by a lever activated ram. The first measure to reinforce the soil was "a thick stratum of grass." This was covered by two layers of tarpaulin followed by "15 inches of well rammed sand." A platform consisting of three layers of 3 inch pine planks topped off the position.

The "Marsh Battery" was completed on August 17, 1863, and stood ready for its armament. The "Swamp Angel," an 8-inch, 200 pound Parrott Rifle was positioned in the battery, and the 11th Maine Volunteer Infantry Regiment manned the weapon, firing incendiary shells at the city of Charleston from August 22–23 of 1863. After lobbing 35 shells into Charleston the Swamp Angel burst, and the battery was abandoned. Like Sumter before, Charleston held out under bombardment and did not capitulate until February 18, 1865.

The artillery piece also inspired a poem by Herman Melville, and is known as one of the most famous artillery pieces of the Civil War.

== Army of the James ==
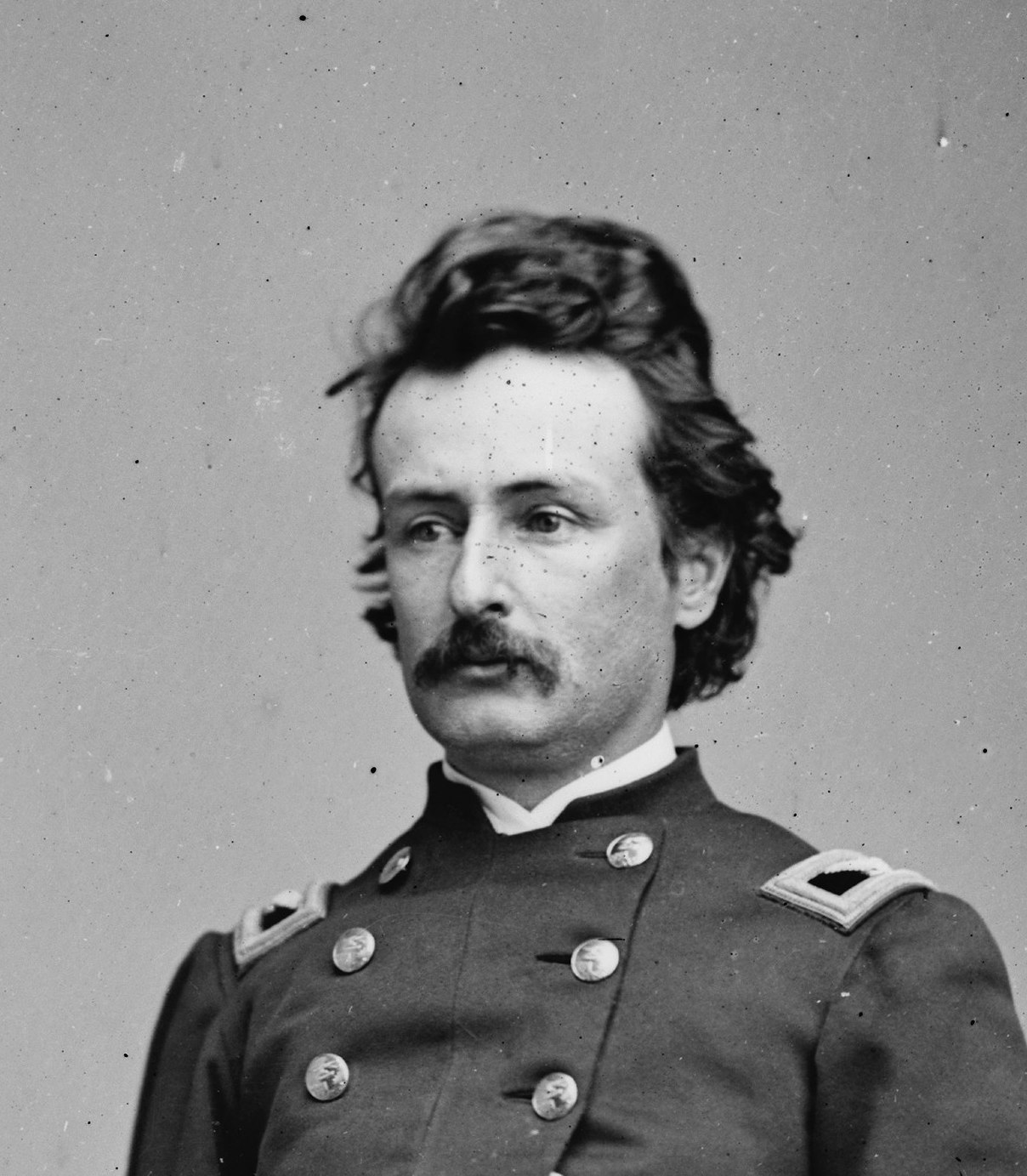
Colonel Edward W. Serrell, the regiment's first commander

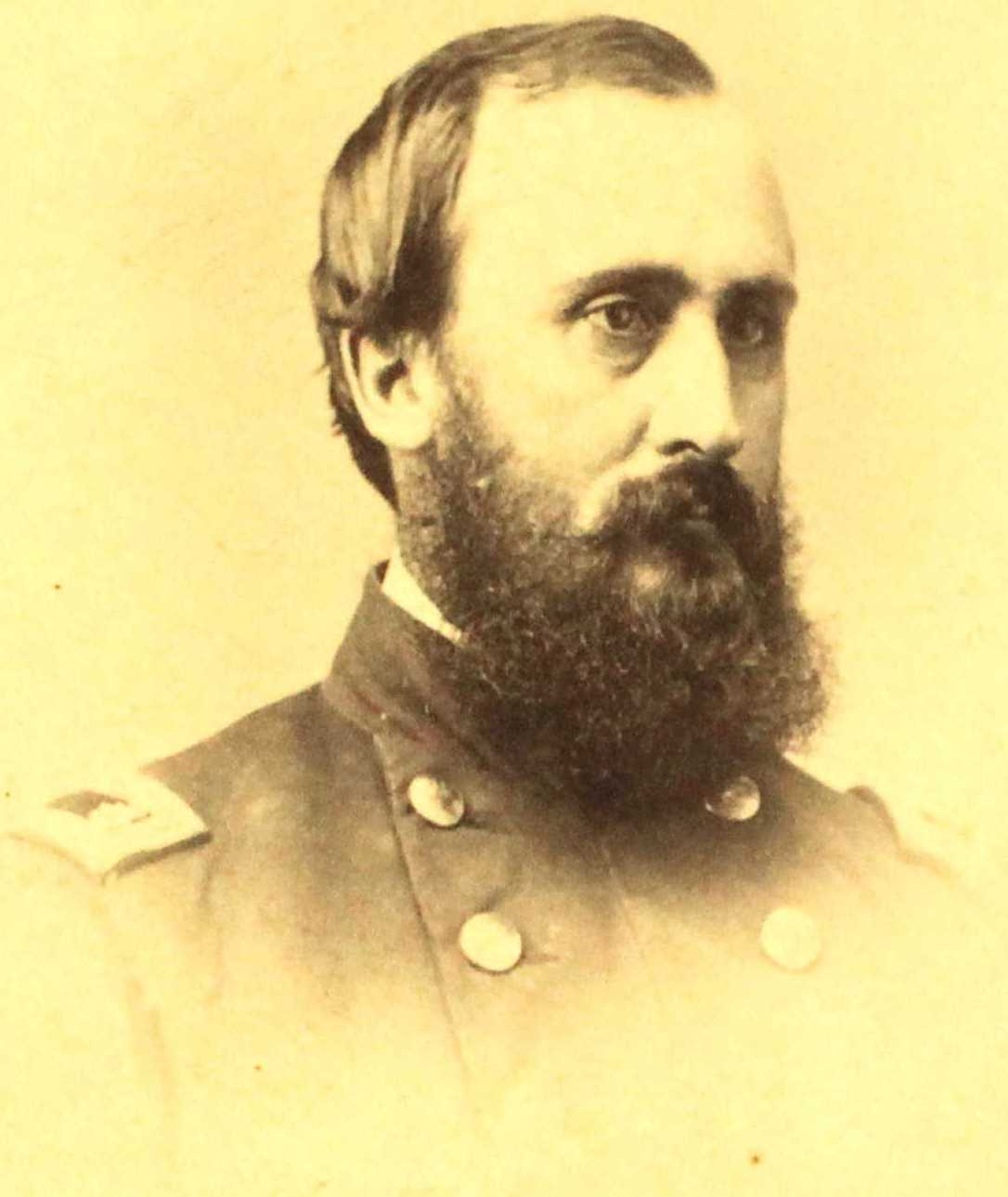
Colonel James F. Hall, the regiment's second commander

In the spring of 1864, companies B, C, E, F, H, K, L & M were sent to join Benjamin Butler's Army of the James, and Serrell was again named chief engineer of the Corps. They participated in the Bermuda Hundred Campaign, building the entire Bermuda Hundred Line, laid many miles of corduroy roads, dredged the Dutch Gap Canal, and constructed the abutments and roads that connected the pontoon bridge assembled by the Engineers of the Army of the Potomac with City Point, Virginia.

During the Richmond–Petersburg Campaign, the Confederate line was broken at Fort Harrison, and the 1st New York set the new line from the newly constructed Fort Brady to Fort Harrison and over to Deep Bottom.

After the fall of Petersburg, the 1st New York was formed into the Engineer Brigade, along with the 15th New York Volunteer Engineer Regiment and the 50th New York Volunteer Engineer Regiment. Col. Serrell was honorably discharged on February 15, 1865, and Col. James F. Hall took command of the regiment until the end of the war.

The regiment was mustered out on June 30, 1865.

== Casualties ==
The regiment lost 2 officers, and 25 enlisted men killed or mortally wounded in combat. 5 Officers and 116 Enlisted men died from disease, for a total of 148 casualties.

== Commanders ==
- Colonel Edward W. Serrell
- Colonel James F. Hall

== Notable soldiers ==
- Lieutenant Frederick Clarke Withers

== See also ==
- List of New York Civil War regiments
- List of Engineer Regiments of the Union Army
