= Star of the South (1853 ship) =

Steamship

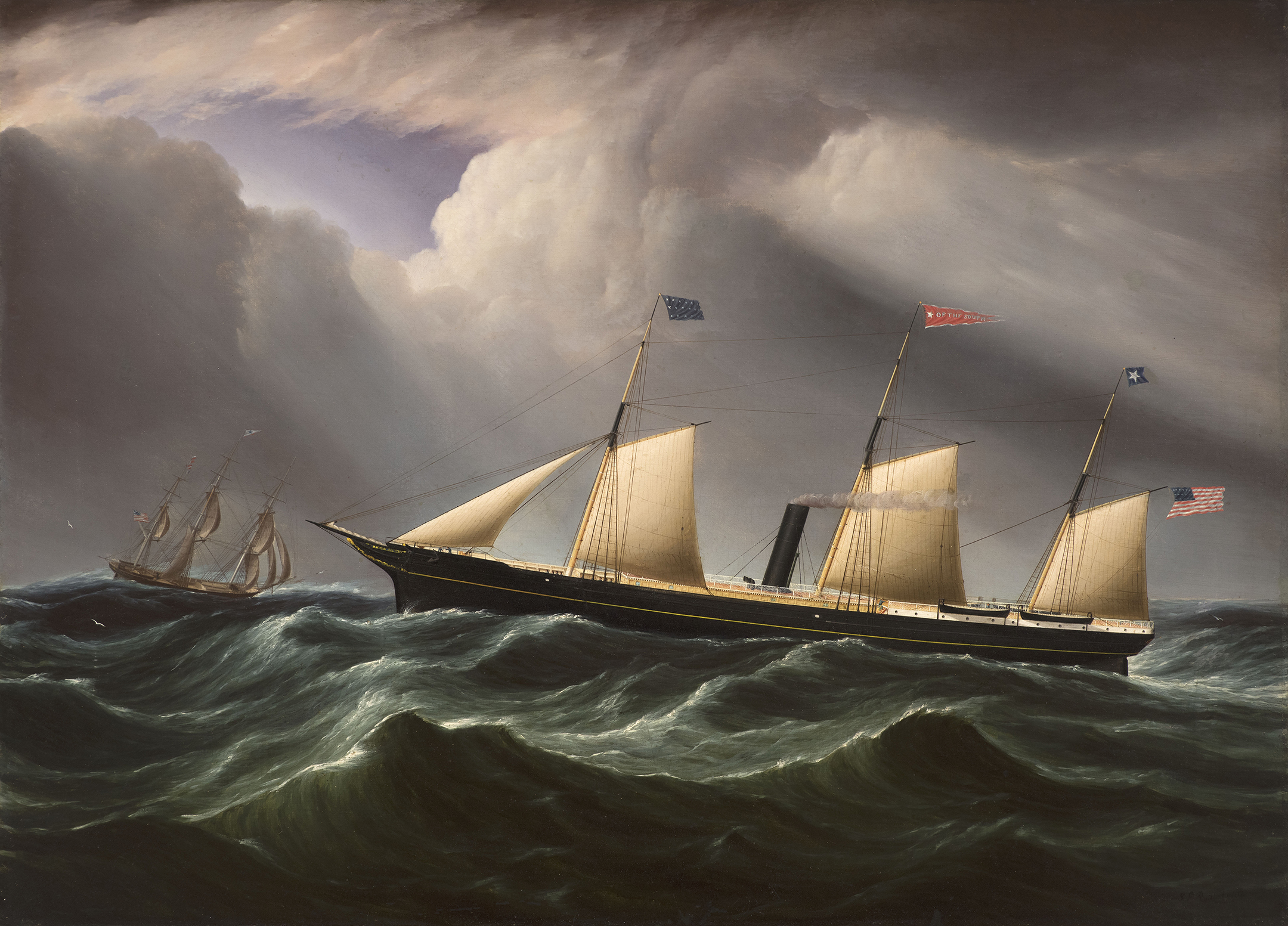
- Star of the South

United States
- Name: Star of the South
- Builder: T. Birely and Son, Philadelphia
- Cost: $120,000
- Launched: March 21, 1853
- Identification: Signal Letters: H. W. T. R.; Official number: 23260
- Fate: Broken up in Boston, in October 1868

General characteristics
- Displacement: 960 tons
- Tons burthen: 1,100
- Length: 212 ft (65 m)
- Beam: 31 ft 5 in (9.58 m)
- Depth of hold: 20 ft 7 in (6.27 m)
- Propulsion: sail and steam engine; propeller-driven
- Sail plan: 3-masted schooner
- Speed: 11.5 knots

Star of the South was a wooden-hulled, propeller-driven steamship launched in 1853. She was one of the first mechanically reliable and economically profitable propeller-driven steamships. Her success foretold the end of paddlewheel propulsion on ocean-going steamships.

She was a success as a commercial freighter, and as an army transport in both the Crimean War and American Civil War. Continuous hard usage during her two wars and technological improvements in shipping, rendered her uncompetitive and she was broken up in 1868.

== Construction and characteristics ==
Star of the South was conceived as a regularly scheduled passenger-cargo ship, or packet, sailing between New York and New Orleans. She was commissioned in 1852 by Thomas P. Stanton & Company of New York and J. W. Stanton & Company of New Orleans. Together they formed the Star Steamship Company which owned the vessel. It was managed by Joseph Warren Stanton of New Orleans. The two Stantons were brothers.

The vessel was built at the shipyard of Theodore Birely and Son in the Kensington neighborhood of Philadelphia under the direction of Captain Richard F. Loper, a pioneer in the use of propeller technology. Star of the South was launched on March 21, 1853. Her original cost was reported as $120,000.

She was 212 feet (65 m) long with a beam of 31.5 feet (9.6 m). She was 1,100 tons burthen with a depth of hold of 20 feet 7 inches (6.27 m). She displaced 960 tons.

Star of the South was propelled by a coal-fired steam engine built by the Franklin Works of J. T. Sutton & Company. The engine was unusual for its day. It had two cylinders which were 52 inches (1.3 m) in diameter and had a 3 feet (0.91 m) stroke. A gearbox turned the single propeller shaft at twice the speed of the engine. The propeller was 10.5 feet (3.2 m) in diameter. During her sea trials, the ship made 11.5 knots. She was also capable of sailing, and was rigged as a three-masted schooner.

Her deckhouse contained accommodations for forty passengers, including a dining salon.

== Star Steamship Company (1853–1857) ==
Star of the South sailed from Philadelphia to New Orleans on her maiden voyage, arriving on May 28, 1853. She then began sailing between New York and New Orleans, as her owners, the Stantons, originally envisaged. She was a fast ship for her times and this was particularly notable since propellers were still viewed as unproven technology. She made her first trip to New York in just over 8 days, but in March 1864 managed it in just 6 days. For the most part her trips were direct from one port to another, but from time to time circumstances called for a stop. She ran short of coal on a November 1853 trip, and stopped in Norfolk, Virginia for a few hours to refuel. A three-day gale in September 1854 sent her into Charleston, South Carolina for brief repairs. Her final sailing between the two ports took place in December 1854.

Her next sailing was in cargo only from New York to Aspinwall, Panama. She was chartered by the Panama Railway Company. Her cargo was bound for California, taking advantage of the newly completed Panama Railroad to carry it to the Pacific. The voyage was explicitly a test of the new route to demonstrate its superiority to shippers. She departed on March 15, 1855 and arrived in Aspinwall on March 26. Her goods were carried across the Isthmus by rail and placed aboard the steamer Golden Gate. They arrived at San Francisco 26 days after leaving New York, showing this to be, by far, the fastest transcontinental freight route at the time. She arrived back in New York, via a coaling stop in Kingston, Jamaica, on April 19. 1855.

Star of the South was next chartered to Roche Brothers & Coffey Company. She sailed to Liverpool, England on June 20, 1855, with 60 passengers aboard. Even before the ship left New York there was speculation that once she reached Europe she would be chartered by one of the combatants in the Crimean War. Thus, the Liverpool charter might best be thought of as a way to defray the cost of moving the ship to her next opportunity.

== Crimean War Service (1855–1856) ==
Between August 1855 and October 1856 Star of the South was one of several American vessels chartered by the French Government to support its troops in the Crimean War. One newspaper reported that the French paid $70,000 (plus provided coal) for the initial six months of charter. While details of her Crimean service have been lost to history, she sailed repeatedly from the French Mediterranean ports of Marseilles and Toulon, to Constantinople and the forward French Army base at Kameisch Bay (now known as Komishova Bay) in Crimea. Contemporary reports have her transporting French troops on multiple occasions. There are also reports of her carrying cargo to the front.

Star of the South returned to Marseilles from Constantinople for the final time on October 27, 1856. She was listed for sale there in January 1857, but sat in port until May 2, 1857, when she sailed for New York. The voyage was a nightmare. She reached New York under sail alone, her engine broken, partially dismasted, and with major rudder and hull damage from two gales encountered en route. The trip took 64 days, finally reaching port on July 8, 1857. The storms and hard usage during the Crimean War left Star of the South in need of repairs.

== New York and Savannah Steam Navigation Company (1857–1861) ==
In August 1857, Star of the South was sold to Samuel L. Mitchell and Son for $32,500. Mitchell's line ran four steamers between New York and Savannah, Georgia as the New York and Savannah Steam Navigation Company. Her new owners undertook a months-long refit, including replacing the ship's boilers. Damage to the engine and other machinery was more extensive than had been disclosed during the sale process resulting in a lawsuit against the Star Steamship Company. Nonetheless, the ship left her dry dock on the Hudson River, her repairs complete, on November 19, 1857.

Star of the South's first sailing on her new line left New York on December 28, 1857, with 10 cabin passengers and 40 in steerage. A cabin passage cost $15. The bulk of her cargo bound for New York was agricultural goods. She sailed from Savannah on September 9, 1858, with her hold full of 314 bales of cotton, 1,090 sacks of wheat, 635 barrels of flour, 109 bags of silver and lead ore, and 28 boxes, 5 casks, and 143 barrels of fruit. Her profitable service continued right to the outbreak of the American Civil War, but growing tensions were reflected in her cargoes. In January 1861 she brought $72,000 of revolvers and Maynard rifles from New England manufacturers to Savannah for the Georgia state government. The ship returned to New York from Savannah for the last time on March 18, 1861.

== Civil War service (1861–1865) ==
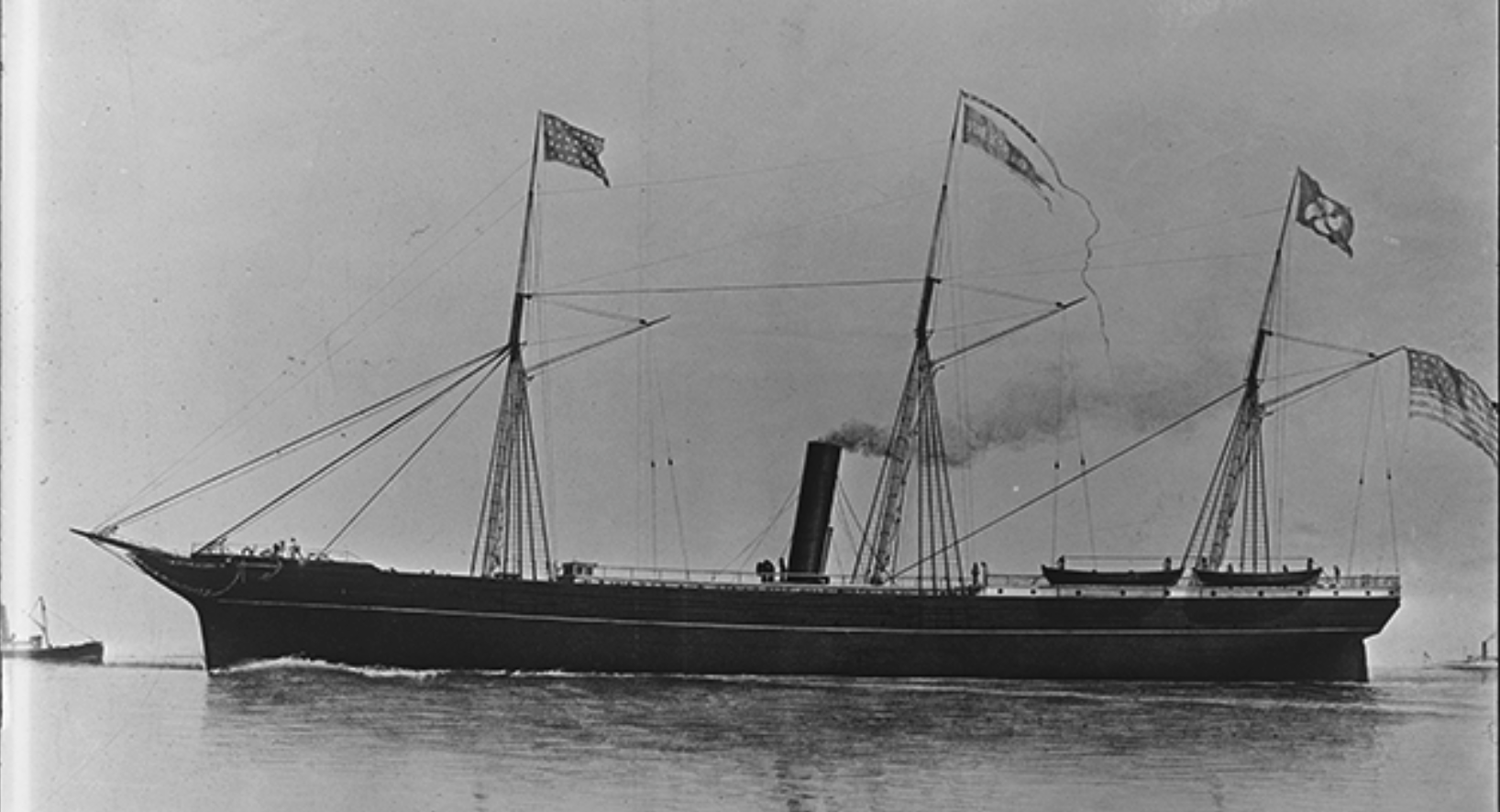
Star of the South. The 35-star Union Jack she is flying dates this photo to the Civil War.

While the Civil War ended her profitable Savanah sailings, it brought another steady client. In April 1861 the Quartermaster Corps of the Union Army chartered the ship as a transport to support its operations along the Confederate coast. Star of the South was chartered by the government for rates that varied between $450 per day to $750 per day. She was an all-purpose transport, moving Union troops, Confederate prisoners, released Union prisoners of war, sick and wounded soldiers, the bodies of fallen troops, civilian refugees, cavalry horses, mules and carts, mail, money, dispatches, and supplies of all sorts. On one trip in 1864 she sailed from Hilton Head, South Carolina with 300,000 pounds of unginned cotton aboard, the product of freed slaves paid wages by the Federal government. The cotton was sold in New York to help fund the war effort. Since the Confederates held the interior of the South, Star of the South and other Army transports were the logistical backbone of the Union offensives launched from the sea.

Army charter contracts for Star of the South
Start date	Expiration Date	Fee per Day
May 21, 1861	unknown	$600
October 5, 1861	unknown	$750
April 26, 1862	unknown	$700
June 9, 1862	April 9, 1862	$600
August 10, 1863	August 29, 1863	$450
September 14, 1863	July 9, 1865	$450
July 29, 1866	August 31, 1866	$684

She got right to work at her new job, embarking the 28th New York Infantry Regiment and moving it from New York to Annapolis, Maryland on May 2, 1861. Her next assignment was to bring mules, carts, hay, straw, and other supplies to Fort Pickens at Pensacola Bay. She left New York on this mission on May 27, 1861, and returned a month later after successfully landing her cargo at the fort.

She sailed from New York on October 13, 1861, with the 1st New York Engineer Regiment aboard. This was the beginning of troop movements to support the attack on Port Royal, South Carolina. Star of the South joined with the rest of the invasion fleet at Hampton Roads, Virginia and carried her engineers to the battle. It was not an easy trip, as the fleet endured a gale en route. During the bad weather, on November 2, 1861, a small steamer transporting cattle, Peerless, hoisted a distress signal and Star of the South came to her aid. Regrettably, the ship hit Peerless on her quarter and did sufficient damage that the ship sank within the hour. Notwithstanding the accident, Star of the South continued on to Port Royal with her engineers. They were reported to be on board, eager to debark, on November 5, 1861.

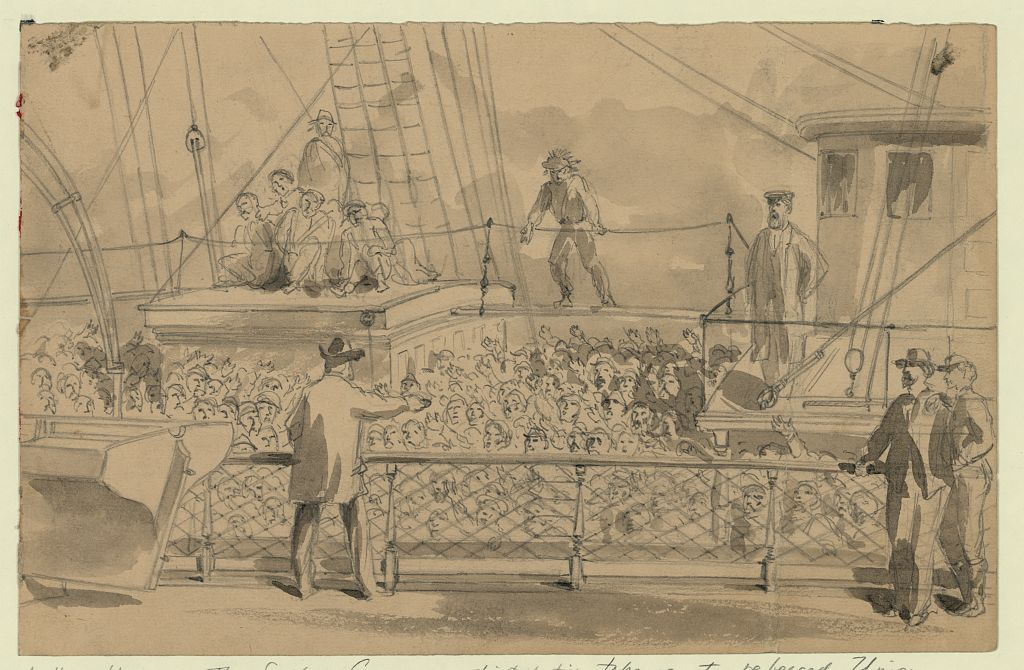
Confederate prisoners on the deck of the Star of the South in New York Harbor in 1862

In January 1862, the ship was sent back to Port Royal with the horses of the 1st Massachusetts Cavalry Regiment, the men having been embarked on other transports.

In March 1862 Star of the South, participated in the assault on Fernandina, Florida, carrying the 9th Maine Infantry Regiment to the battle. The Union attack was successful, but much of the civilian population of Jacksonville, Florida and surrounding areas became refugees. In April 1872, Flag Officer Samuel DuPont, who commanded the Federal fleet, ordered Star of the South to carry to New York those refugees who chose to leave. The ship arrived there with 54 aboard on April 18, 1862.

In May 1862, Star of the South was employed moving Confederate prisoners of war from Fortress Monroe. On June 2, 1862, she sailed into New York Harbor with 541 men who were captured at the Battle of Hanover Court House. They were transferred to detention on Governors Island. In December 1864 she was involved in a prisoner exchange and carried 600 released Union prisoners of war from Charleston, South Carolina to Annapolis, Maryland.

After her eventful early sorties as a part of invasion fleets, Star of the South settled down to routine sailings from New York to New Orleans, stopping at several Union controlled ports along the way. For example, she sailed from New York on March 8, 1863, and stopped at Pensacola and Key West before arriving in New Orleans on March 25, 1863.

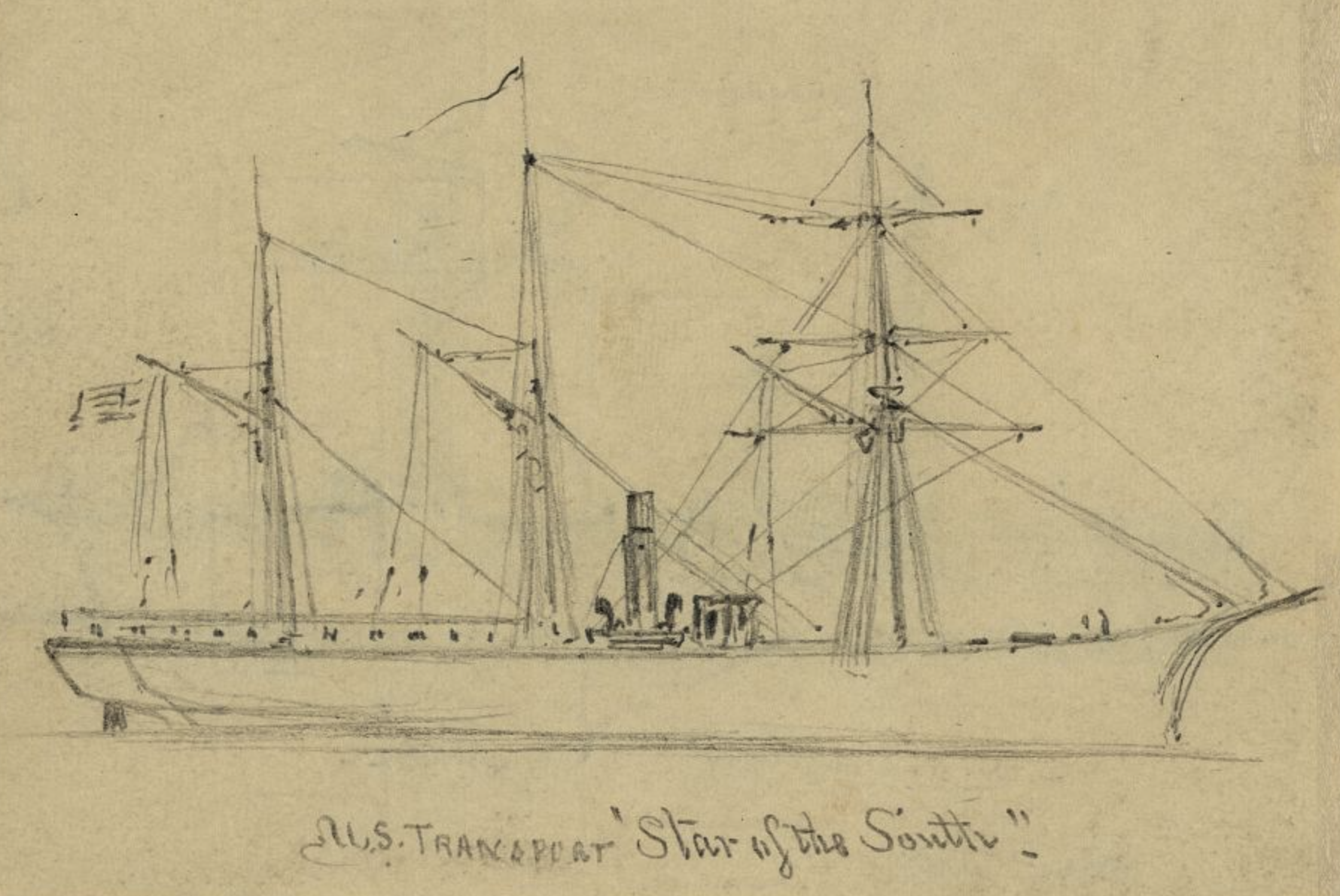
Star of the South sketched during the American Civil War

Star of the South was sufficiently powerful to tow other ships when required. She towed the disabled USS Vermont to Port Royal in April 1862. She towed the monitor USS Passaic to the Charleston Harbor bar in July 1863 and performed the same service for USS Lehigh in September 1863. Later in that same month, Star of the South towed USS Alabama from New York to Portsmouth, New Hampshire where she was ordered to remain until a yellow fever outbreak was over. USS Lehigh had an unlucky December 1863 at Charleston and went aground in the harbor, at which point Confederate artillery batteries hit her several times. Once Lehigh was refloated, Star of the South towed the disabled monitor to Port Royal for repairs.

The end of the Civil War in April 1865 did not end the Army's use of the ship. Come June 1865, Star of the South supported Major General Weitzel's "Texas expedition" to eject the French who had occupied portions of Mexico. There were 650 troops aboard for the trip from Fortress Monroe to Brazos Santiago. After discharging her troops in Texas, she sailed to New Orleans and thence to New York. Her arrival on July 9, 1865, marked the end of her service for the military.

== Atlantic Coast Mail Steamship Company (1865) ==
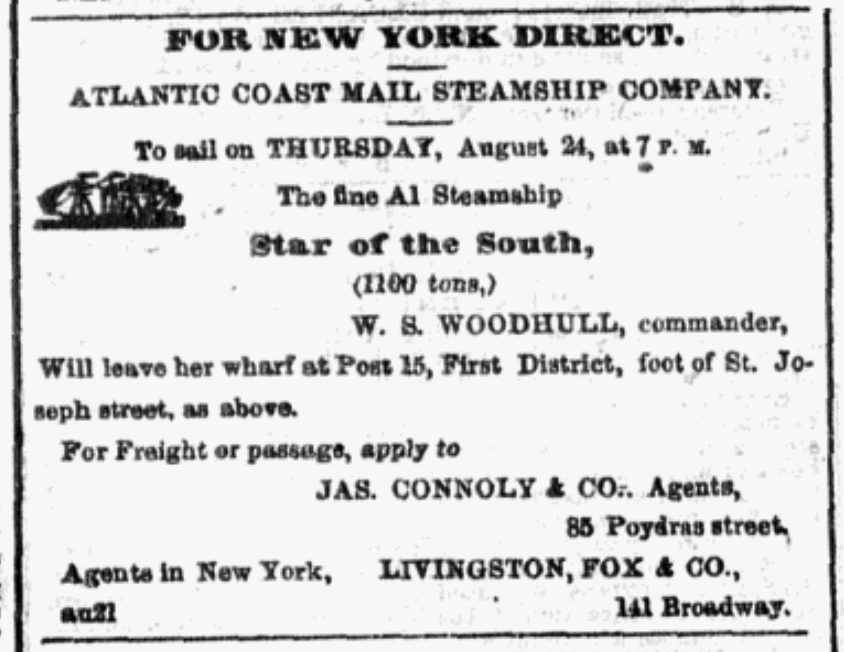
1865 advertisement for Star of the South passage from New Orleans to New York

Less than a month after her last army voyage, on August 7, 1865, she left New York for New Orleans for commercial purposes. She sailed under charter to Livingston, Fox, and Company, which operated as the Atlantic Coast Mail Steamship Company. The war's end dramatically increased trade with the South, and Star of the South was immediately pressed into service. The short gap suggests that there was no time for significant repairs to the ship after four years of continuous, hard, wartime usage. She arrived in New Orleans on August 15, 1865. It may be a comment on the state of her accommodations that she carried only two passengers. The ship ran one more trip for the Atlantic Coast Line, arriving back in New York on October 4, 1865.

== Baltimore and Charleston Steamship Company (1866–1868) ==
Mitchell put Star of the South on the auction block several times before she was finally sold to Pendergast, Fenwick, and Company in May 1866. She became one of four ships in the Baltimore and Charleston Steamship Line. She made trips from Baltimore to both Charleston and New York for her new line.

In July 1866, Star of the South was chartered by the U.S. government as a troopship once again. As a result of disturbances with Native American tribes in the west, the Army moved 450 recruits for the 4th Cavalry Regiment and 6th Cavalry Regiment from Baltimore to Galveston. Regrettably, the recruits were capable of creating disturbances of their own, so the ship stopped at Fortress Monroe en route to acquire weapons to maintain order aboard. She arrived in Galveston on August 16, 1866, and returned to Baltimore on August 31, 1866. After her foray with the cavalry, she returned to her regular Baltimore routes.

Her sailings were brought to a sudden end in early November 1866 when she broke her propeller shaft off Cape Henry while en route from Charleston to New York with 1,100 bales of cotton aboard. She was towed to Baltimore where she remained through all of 1867. It is not clear when repairs were made but on January 25, 1868, she left New York under charter for Santiago de Cuba. She returned to New York on March 9, 1868. This was a very slow sailing, suggesting that her machinery was not working as well as it once did.

== Breaking up (1868) ==
By 1868 Star of the South had been through two wars and 15 years of storms, collisions, breakdowns, and near continuous use. While she proved that propeller-driven vessels could operate reliably and profitably, she could not compete with the more modern propeller steamers her success inspired. On June 3, 1868, Star of the South was put up for auction in New York. Ten days later she sailed for Boston, home to her new owners. In October 1868 she was stripped of her machinery, towed up on Moon Island in Boston Harbor and burned so that her iron could be recovered from the ashes.
