= Engineers' Club of Saint Louis =

- Formation: December 2, 1868; 157 years ago
- Type: not-for-profit membership organization
- Headquarters: St. Louis, Missouri
- Location(s): 4359 Lindell Blvd; St. Louis, Missouri; United States
- Members: 1000+
- Official language: English
- President: Jeremiah King
- President-elect (2021): John Killips
- Website: www.engineersclub.net

The Engineers' Club of St. Louis is a professional association based in St. Louis, Missouri and is the third oldest engineering society in America.

== Mission statement ==
The mission of the club is:

To promote the educational, social and professional advancement of its members; to assist community leaders, civic organizations and public agencies by providing advice on and giving support to issues which benefit the St. Louis community and to serve as a focal point of engineering activities in the St. Louis area by acting as liaison between the Club's many affiliated societies and maintaining physical facilities which can be used by the engineering community for educational, social and business activities.

== History ==
The first president of the club was Henry Flad, prominent engineer in St. Louis in the late 1800s and assistant to James B. Eads in the building of the Eads Bridge.
