= Henry Flad =

- Born: July 30, 1824; Rennhof, Hemsbach, Weinheim, Grand Duchy of Baden
- Died: July 20, 1898 (aged 73); Pittsburgh, Pennsylvania, US
- Resting place: Saint Louis, Missouri
- Education: Ludwig-Maximilians-Universität München
- Occupations: Military engineer; Civil engineer; Hydraulic engineer
- Military career
- Allegiance: Union
- Branch: United States Army
- Service years: 1861–1864
- Rank: Colonel
- Commands: Engineer Regiment of the West; 1st Regiment Missouri Volunteer Engineers
- Conflicts: American Civil War: Savannah Campaign

Henry Flad (30 July 1824 – 20 July 1898) was a German-born civil engineer who served as an engineering officer in the Union Army during the American Civil War, a railroad engineer before and during the civil war, and later as a civil engineer after the war. He co-founded the Engineers' Club of Saint Louis, and was president of the American Society of Civil Engineers in 1886.

== Early life ==
Henry Flad was born on 30 July 1824, near Heidelberg, Baden. His father, Jacob Flad, who died in the same year, along with his mother, Francisca Brunn Flad, soon afterwards moved to the town of Speyer, Bavaria. After passing through the preparatory schools of Speyer, young Henry entered the Ludwig-Maximilians-Universität München in Bavaria, where he took the polytechnic course.

After his graduation in 1846, at twenty-two years of age, he was given a position in the engineering service of the Bavarian Government, his first employment being on works for the improvement of the River Rhine. Meanwhile, encouraged by the success of the French Revolution of 1848, the German people revolted, beginning the German Revolution of 1848. The princes of the many states into which Germany was divided at the time conceded to the convocation of a National Assembly, which, in May 1848, met in Frankfurt to create a constitution for a united Germany, which would later be known as the Frankfurt Constitution. However, disagreements began to appear within the National Assembly. As a result, the monarchs in Germany soon reasserted themselves and repudiated the authority of the Parliament.

In Southern Germany, many members of the Frankfurt Parliament began to take up arms on behalf of the parliament. Henry Flad had joined the German revolutionaries as an engineering officer. After the defeat of the revolutionaries in 1849, Henry Flad emigrated to America.

=== Emigration to America ===
He arrived in New York City in the autumn of 1849. His first employment after his landing was as a draftsman in an architect's office. Soon after, he entered engineering service in the New York and Erie Railroad, which was under construction at the time. Another civil engineer, James P. Kirkwood, along with James H. Morley, both of whom Flad was afterwards associated with, were also employed at this time on the same road. After the completion of the New York and Erie Railroad in 1851, Flad later entered engineering service in the Ohio and Mississippi Railroad from Cincinnati to St. Louis, his headquarters now being at Vincennes.

Upon the opening of the Ohio and Mississippi Railroad to St. Louis in 1854, Flad went to Missouri as an assistant engineer on the Iron Mountain Railroad, of which his former colleague on the Erie Railroad, James H. Morley, was the chief engineer. During the construction of this railroad, Flad was mainly working at Potosi. After its completion to Pilot Knob, he continued to be employed at the railroad company, with his headquarters now located at Arcadia.

== Civil War ==
Upon the outbreak of the Civil War in 1861, Flad came to St. Louis and enlisted as a private soldier in Company F of the Third Regiment of the United States Reserve Corps. From this rank he rose rapidly to the rank of corporal, and then later to the rank of sergeant.

In July 1861, Henry Flad was made captain of Company B of J. W. Bissell's Engineer Regiment of the West. In August, he was detailed by General John C. Frémont, then in command at St. Louis, for service in the construction of fortifications at Cape Girardeau, Missouri, where he remained for several months. Later, when Frémont was succeeded by General Henry Halleck, Flad was ordered to join General John Pope in southeast Missouri, and served as a staff officer in the Battle of Island Number Ten, after which he rejoined his regiment at New Madrid. He was with his regiment at Fort Pillow and the Battle of Shiloh and in the operations before Corinth. In the summer of 1862, he was tasked with repairing the Mobile and Ohio Railroad, building forts at Corinth, and repairing the Mississippi Central Railroad. He was also engaged in Ulysses S. Grant's advance on Grenada. In February 1863, at the Battle of Young's Point, he was employed in engineering work.

In April 1863, under Colonel William W. Wright he was in charge of the repairs of the Memphis and Charleston Railroad at Memphis, Grand Junction, Jackson, and Columbus. In October of the same year he was employed in repairing the same railroad east of Corinth under General Sherman and was with him at Cherokee, Bear Creek and Iuka in northern Mississippi.

On 1 January 1864, at Nashville, he was transferred to the 1st Regiment Missouri Volunteer Engineers, now as a Colonel. In the summer of 1864, under Colonel Wright, he was tasked with completing the Nashville and Northwestern Railroad from Nashville to Johnsonville and in constructing defensive works. In August, he was ordered to Atlanta, and served here until the first of November, constructing a new line of fortifications at Atlanta. On 12 November 1864, Henry Flad was discharged from command after his term in service has expired.

== Life after the Civil War ==
=== St. Louis Waterworks ===
After his service in the Civil War ended, Flad returned to St. Louis and began to look around for employment in his profession. The demand for an improved water supply for St. Louis led to a state law authorizing the appointment of a Board of Water Commissioners, charged with the duty of making surveys and plans, and constructing a new system of waterworks for the city. James P. Kirkwood, who had formerly been chief engineer of the Missouri Pacific Railroad and had recently completed the construction of new waterworks for Brooklyn, New York, was appointed chief engineer. Henry Flad was appointed chief assistant engineer.

Surveys and investigations began, and by the end of 1865, a plan was presented for new works with intake and settling basins and filter beds at the Chain of Rocks, and a distributing reservoir on what was then known as Rinkels Hill on Easton Avenue near the present city limits. This plan received the approval of the Board of Water Commissioners, however, it had received disapproval from leading citizens as well as the city authorities. This later led to the City Council forcing the Board of Water Commissioners to be disbanded. In July 1866, a new board was appointed. Meanwhile, Kirkwood had been commissioned to go to Europe to study the subject of water filtration, and Flad became the acting chief engineer. In December, 1866, a revised plan with intake and settling basins at Bissell Point and a distributing reservoir on Compton Hill was presented.

In the spring of 1867, the act organizing the Board of Water Commissioners was amended, the number of members being reduced from four to three, and in March, 1867, a new board was appointed with Henry Flad as one of its members, and was expected to hold this position until April 1875. During this time and under his general supervision, the new waterworks were completed and put into service in 1872.

=== Eads Bridge ===
Whilst he was still acting as assistant engineer to Kirkwood, Flad made the acquaintance of James B. Eads, who was, at that time, employed upon plans for gun carriages and turrets. Eads, upon his request, had been granted space in which to set a draftsman at work. This was followed by frequent discussions between the two men upon engineering questions, and this led to a mutual recognition of each other's abilities and laid the foundation of a lifelong friendship. Soon after, Eads began work on constructing the Eads Bridge over the Mississippi River at St Louis. Later, he assigned the position of chief assistant engineer to Flad. As the duties as a member of the Board of Water Commissioners did not require all his time, Flad accepted this position, and would remain as the chief assistant engineer until the bridge's completion in 1874. During the construction of the bridge, Flad had been able to erect the bridge without the use of falseworks.

=== Public works in St. Louis ===
In 1875 and 1876, he became the consulting engineer in various works in conjunction with Charles Pfeiffer, who had been associated with him on the St. Louis bridge, Thomas Whitman, chief engineer of the Waterworks, and Prof. Charles A. Smith of Washington University. He was also an engineer for the commissioners who purchased and laid out Forest Park.

In the autumn of 1876, the new charter of the city of St. Louis was inaugurated, and Flad was elected the first president of the newly constituted Board of Public Improvements. This office he held continuously for nearly fourteen years being re-elected in 1880, 1884, and 1888.

In the spring of 1890, having become somewhat weary under the increasing burdens of his position, he resigned his office as President of the Board of Public Improvements to accept membership in the Mississippi River Commission. He remained in this position until his death. The new policy of deepening the low water channel of the river by dredging rather than by contraction works, which the commission adopted during his membership, was very largely the result of his efforts. Flad became a charter member of the Engineers Club of St. Louis, and later became its president for twelve years, from 1868 to 1880. He became a member of the American Society of Civil Engineers February 15, 1871, and became President of the Society from 19 January 1887.

== Death ==
He died on 20 June 1898, at Pittsburgh, where he stopped on his way home from a meeting of the Mississippi River Commission to visit Godfrey Stengel, a lifelong friend who had come with him on the same ship to America forty-nine years before. His cause of death had been identified as acute heart failure while walking to Highland Park in company with Stengel.

== Legacy ==
Today, Flad Avenue in St. Louis is named after Henry Flad.
