= Second Battle of Fort Fisher order of battle: Union =

The following Union Army and Navy units and commanders fought in the Second Battle of Fort Fisher (January 13–15, 1865) of the American Civil War. The Confederate order of battle is listed separately. Order of battle compiled from the army and navy organization during the expedition.

== Abbreviations used ==
=== Military rank ===
- MG = Major General
- BG = Brigadier General
- Col = Colonel
- Ltc = Lieutenant Colonel
- Maj = Major
- Cpt = Captain
- Lt = 1st Lieutenant
- Bvt = Brevet
- Cdre=Commodore
- Lcdr=Lieutenant Commander
- Cmdr=Commander

== Union Forces ==
=== Army ===
==== Terry's Provisional Corps ====
Bvt MG Alfred H. Terry

- Engineering Advisor: Ltc Cyrus B. Comstock
- Assistant Adjutant General: Cpt Adrian Terry

Division	Brigade	Regiments and Others
First Division (XXIV Corps)	2nd Brigade Col Joseph C. Abbott	6th Connecticut:Col. Alfred P. Rockwell; 7th Connecticut: Cpt. John Thompson (w), Cpt William S. Marble; 3rd New Hampshire: Cpt. William H. Trickey; 7th New Hampshire: Ltc. Augustus W. Rollins; 16th New York Heavy Artillery (detachment): Maj. Frederick W. Prince
Second Division (XXIV Corps); BG Adelbert Ames	1st Brigade Brevet BG N. Martin Curtis (w) 15 Jan; Maj Ezra L. Walrath	3rd New York: Cpt James H. Reeves (w), Lt Edwin A. Behan (w); 112th New York: Col John F. Smith (k) 15 Jan; 117th New York: Ltc Francis X. Meyer (w); 142nd New York: Ltc Albert M. Barney
Second Division (XXIV Corps); BG Adelbert Ames	2nd Brigade Col Galusha Pennypacker (w) 15 Jan; Maj Oliver P. Harding	47th New York: Cpt. Joseph M. McDonald; 48th New York: Ltc. William B. Coan (w), Maj. Nere A. Elfwing; 76th Pennsylvania: Col. John S. Littell (w), Maj Charles Knerr; 97th Pennsylvania: Lt. John Wainwright; 203rd Pennsylvania: Col. John W. Moore (k), Ltc. Jonas W. Lyman (k), Maj Oliver P. Harding, Cpt Heber B. Essington
Second Division (XXIV Corps); BG Adelbert Ames	3rd Brigade Col Louis Bell (mw) 15 Jan; Col Alonzo Alden (w); Ltc Nathan J. Johnson	13th Indiana: Ltc. Samuel M. Zent; 4th New Hampshire: Cpt. John H. Roberts; 115th New York: Ltc. Nathan J. Johnson (w); 169th New York: Col. Alonzo Alden, Ltc. James A. Colvin
Third Division (XXV Corps); BG Charles J. Paine	2nd Brigade Col John W. Ames	4th USCT: Ltc George Rogers; 6th USCT: Maj Augutus S. Boernstein; 30th USCT: Ltc Hiram A. Oakman; 39th USCT: Col Ozora P. Stearns
Third Division (XXV Corps); BG Charles J. Paine	3rd Brigade Col Elias Wright	1st USCT: Ltc Giles H. Rich; 5th USCT: Maj William R. Brazie; 10th USCT: Ltc Edward H. Powell; 27th USCT: Bvt BG Albert M. Blackman; 37th USCT: Col Nathan Goff Jr.
Third Division (XXV Corps); BG Charles J. Paine	Artillery	1st Connecticut Heavy Artillery (3 companies): Cpt. William G. Pride; 16th Independent Battery New York Light Artillery: Cpt. Richard H. Lee; Battery E, 3rd U.S. Artillery: Lt. John Myrick
Third Division (XXV Corps); BG Charles J. Paine	Engineers	15th New York Engineers (2 companies): Lt. K. Samuel O'Keefe

=== Navy ===
North Atlantic Blockading Squadron – Rear Admiral David D. Porter

- Line Number 1
  - USS Brooklyn: Cpt. James Alden
  - USS Canonicus: Lcdr. George Belknap
  - USS Huron: Lcdr. Thomas O. Selfridge Jr.
  - USS Kansas: Lcdr. Pendleton G. Watmough
  - USS Mahopac: Lcdr. Edward Potter
  - USS Maumee: Lcdr. Ralph Chandler
  - USS Mohican: Cmdr. Daniel Ammen
  - USS Monadnock: Cmdr. Enoch G. Parrott
  - USS New Ironsides: Cmdr. William Radford
  - USS Pawtuxet: Cmdr. James H. Spotts
  - USS Pequot: Lcdr. Daniel L. Braine
  - USS Pontoosuc: Lcdr. William G. Temple
  - USS Saugus: Cmdr. Edmund R. Colhoun
  - USS Seneca: Lcdr. Montgomery Sicard
  - USS Tacony: Lcdr. William T. Truxton
  - USS Unadilla: Lcdr. Frank M. Ramsay
  - USS Yantic: Lcdr. Thomas C. Harris
- Line Number 2
  - USS Colorado: Cdre. Henry K. Thatcher
  - USS Juniata: Cpt. William Rogers Taylor
  - USS Mackinaw: Cmdr. John C. Beaumont
  - USS Minnesota: Cdre. Joseph Lanman
  - USS Powhatan: Cdre. James F. Schenck
  - USS Shenandoah: Cpt. Daniel B. Ridgley
  - USS Susquehanna: Cdre. Sylvanus William Godon
  - USS Ticonderoga: Cpt. Charles Steedman
  - USS Tuscarora: Cmdr. James M. Frailey
  - USS Vanderbilt: Cpt. Charles W. Pickering
  - USS Wabash: Cpt. Melancton Smith
- Line Number 3
  - USS Chippewa: Lcdr. Aaron Weaver
  - USS Fort Jackson: Cpt. Benjamin F. Sands
  - USS Iosco: Cmdr. John Guest
  - USS Maratanza: Lcdr. George Young
  - USS Montgomery: Lt. Thomas C. Dunn
  - USS Monticello: Lcdr. William B. Cushing
  - USS Osceola: Cmdr. John M.B. Clitz
  - USS Quaker City: Cmdr. William F. Spicer
  - USS R. R. Cuyler: Cmdr. Charles Henry Bromedge Caldwell
  - USS Rhode Island: Cmdr. Stephen D. Trenchard
  - USS Santiago de Cuba: Cpt. Oliver S. Glisson
  - USS Sassacus: Lcdr. John L. Davis
- Reserve Line
  - USS Advance: Lcdr. John H. Upshur
  - USS Alabama: Lt. Amos R. Langthorne
  - USS Aries: Lt. Francis S. Wells
  - USS Britannia: Lt. William B. Sheldon
  - USS Cherokee: Lt. William E. Dennison
  - USS Emma: Lt. James M. Williams
  - USS Eolus
  - USS Fort Donelson
  - USS Gettysburg: Lt. Roswell Lamson
  - USS Governor Buckingham: Lt. John MacDiarmid
  - USS Lilian : Lt. T.A. Harris
  - USS Little Ada
  - USS Malvern: Lt. Benjamin H. Porter
  - USS Nansemond
  - USS Tristram Shandy: Lt. Edward F. Devens
  - USS Wilderness
- Naval Landing Party (1,600 Sailors and 400 Marines): Fleet Cpt. Kidder Breese:
  - 1st Division: Lcdr. Charles H. Cushman
  - 2nd Division: Lcdr. James Parker Jr.
  - 3rd Division: Lcdr. Thomas O. Selfridge Jr.
  - 4th Division (USMC): Cpt. Lucien L. Dawson

== See also ==
- North Carolina in the American Civil War
