= Battle of Fort Fisher order of battle =

Battle of Fort Fisher order of battle may refer to:

- First Battle of Fort Fisher order of battle
- Second Battle of Fort Fisher order of battle
