= James W. Verney =

- Born: January 17, 1834; Bath, Maine, US
- Died: November 29, 1902 (aged 68)
- Burial place: Cedar Grove Cemetery, Dorchester, Massachusetts
- Military career
- Allegiance: United States
- Branch: United States Navy
- Rank: Chief Quartermaster
- Unit: USS Pontoosuc
- Conflicts: American Civil War • Wilmington Campaign
- Awards: Medal of Honor

James W. Verney (January 17, 1834 – November 29, 1902) was a Union Navy sailor in the American Civil War and a recipient of the U.S. military's highest decoration, the Medal of Honor, for his actions during the Wilmington Campaign.

Born on January 17, 1834, in Bath, Maine, Verney was living in Portland, Maine, when he joined the Navy. He served as a chief quartermaster on the USS Pontoosuc during the Wilmington Campaign, from the First Battle of Fort Fisher on December 24, 1864, through the campaign's end on February 22, 1865. For his actions in this period, he was awarded the Medal of Honor months later, on June 22, 1865.

Verney's official Medal of Honor citation reads:

Served as chief quartermaster on board the U.S.S. Pontoosuc during the capture of Fort Fisher and Wilmington, 24 December 1864 to 22 February 1865. Carrying out his duties faithfully throughout this period, Verney was recommended for gallantry and skill and for his cool courage while under fire of the enemy throughout these various actions.

Verney was lighthouse keeper of the Whaleback Light near Kittery, Maine, from 1869 to 1871.

Verney died on November 29, 1902, at age 68 and was buried at Cedar Grove Cemetery in Dorchester, Massachusetts.
