= Anthony Williams (Medal of Honor) =

American Civil War sailor and Medal of Honor recipient

- Born: c. 1822; Plymouth, Massachusetts
- Military career
- Allegiance: United States
- Branch: United States Navy
- Rank: Sailmaker's Mate
- Unit: USS Pontoosuc
- Conflicts: American Civil War • Wilmington Campaign
- Awards: Medal of Honor

Anthony Williams (born c. 1822, date of death unknown) was a Union Navy sailor in the American Civil War and a recipient of the U.S. military's highest decoration, the Medal of Honor, for his actions during the Wilmington Campaign.

Born in about 1822 in Plymouth, Massachusetts, Williams was living in Portsmouth, Maine, when he joined the Navy. He served as a sailmaker's mate on the USS Pontoosuc in the Wilmington Campaign, from the First Battle of Fort Fisher on December 24, 1864, through the campaign's end on February 22, 1865. For his actions during this period, he was awarded the Medal of Honor months later, on June 22, 1865.

Williams' official Medal of Honor citation reads:

Served as sailmaker's mate on board the U.S.S. Pontoosuc during the capture of Fort Fisher and Wilmington, 24 December 1864 to 22 February 1865. Carrying out his duties faithfully throughout this period, Williams was recommended for gallantry and skill and for his cool courage while under the fire of the enemy throughout these various actions.
