= Nathan Goff Jr. (general) =

Nathan Goff, Jr. was a Union Army officer from Rhode Island during the American Civil War.

== Biography ==
=== Early life ===
Nathan Goff, Jr., son of Nathan and Nancy (Ingraham) Goff, was born in Warren, Rhode Island on August 5, 1827. His father was born in the same town in 1802, and his mother was born in Glocester, Rhode Island in 1803. In 1833 his parents moved from Warren to Bristol, Rhode Island, where Nathan received his education in the district school.

At the age of seventeen he was apprenticed to the sail-making business with T. & B. T. Cranston, and two years later, on the retirement of both members of that firm, he, with George E. Cranston, took over the business. In 1850 he engaged as an engraver with Smith, Dewey & Eddy of Warren, in the manufacture of jewelry.

=== Civil War service ===
In 1861 he was a brigadier-general in the Rhode Island Militia, and soon after the attack on Fort Sumter, he offered his services to Governor William Sprague of Rhode Island, to serve in any position given to him for the preservation of the Union. He soon after organized a company of volunteers in Bristol, which, with members from Warren, were called the Bristol County Company. As captain of this company, which became Company G, Second Rhode Island Volunteer Infantry, he was mustered into the United States service on June 6, 1861 for three years.

He fought in the first Battle of Bull Run on July 21, 1861; the regiment was later assigned to the Army of the Potomac, participating in its many engagements. On July 24, 1862, he was promoted to be the major (third in command) of the 2nd Rhode Island and, on December 12, 1862, was promoted to lieutenant-colonel (second in command).

In December 1863, by permission from the War Department, he appeared before General Casey's Board of Examination in Washington, and passed an examination for lieutenant-colonel with a rating of "first class". On December 31 he was assigned as the lieutenant colonel of the 22nd United States Colored Infantry and ordered to Yorktown, Virginia. Afterwards his new regiment became a part of the Army of the James.

In February 1864 he was presented by the citizens of Warren a sword, belt, sash, and other accouterments. At the Second Battle of Petersburg, Virginia on June 15, 1864, he was severely wounded and taken to Chesapeake Hospital in Hampton, Virginia. In October 1864, on the recommendation of his brigade and division commanders, he was promoted to the rank of colonel, and assigned to the command of the 37th United States Colored Infantry. He assumed command on November 10, 1864. Being detached from the Army of the James, he joined the expedition of Major General Benjamin F. Butler against Fort Fisher, North Carolina, also participating in the second expedition under Major General Alfred H. Terry, and fought in the capture of the fort. He fought in all subsequent engagements of the Army of the James in North Carolina until the surrender of General Joseph Johnston's army to General William T. Sherman, at Raleigh, North Carolina in late April 1865.

In May 1865, Goff was assigned to the command of the post of Wilmington, North Carolina, and remained on duty in that state, the troops of his command occupying the forts on the coasts of North and South Carolina, being in temporary command of the District of Wilmington and Department of North Carolina. In June 1865, by recommendation of Major-General Charles J. Paine and Brigadier-General John W. Ames, his division and brigade commanders, he was promoted by the President to be brigadier-general of volunteers by brevet, "for long and faithful services and gallant conduct in the field". He was assigned on November 3, 1866, as president of a general court-martial at Raleigh, North Carolina, and, though his regiment was mustered out in February 1867, he was retained in the service as president of general court-martial till June 13, 1867, when he was honorably discharged, being among the last volunteer officers mustered out of service.

=== Post war ===
Upon returning to Rhode Island, he returned to his former occupation in Providence. He later became a Companion of the Massachusetts Commandery of the Military Order of the Loyal Legion of the United States and was assigned insignia number 3148.

His talents, character, and public services caused him to be greatly respected by his fellow citizens. On August 10, 1870, he was appointed by President Ulysses S. Grant as deputy collector of customs for the port of Providence, a position which he held for more than twenty years. Politically, he was a Whig and a Republican. In his religious practice he was a Baptist.

He died in Warren on April 17, 1903.

== Family ==
General Goff married his first wife, Sarah S. Surgens of Warren, in November, 1849. By her he had three children - Ella S., Walter I., and Mabel D. Sarah died on October 13, 1888. He later married Helen M. Surgens, of Boston, Massachusetts. Helen died in 1912.

== See also ==
- List of American Civil War brevet generals (Union)
