= George W. McWilliams =

George Washington McWilliams
- Born: September 26, 1842; Waterford, Pennsylvania
- Died: August 11, 1900 (aged 57)
- Burial place: Ida Grove Cemetery, Ida Grove, Iowa
- Military career
- Allegiance: United States
- Branch: United States Navy
- Service years: 1864 - 1865
- Rank: Landsman
- Unit: (United States Navy) USS Pontoosuc
- Conflicts: American Civil War • Wilmington Campaign
- Awards: Medal of Honor

George Washington McWilliams (September 26, 1842 – August 11, 1900) was a Union Navy sailor in the American Civil War and a recipient of the U.S. military's highest decoration, the Medal of Honor, for his actions during the Wilmington Campaign.

Born on September 26, 1842, in Waterford, Pennsylvania, McWilliams was still living in that city when he joined the Navy. He served as a landsman on the USS Pontoosuc in the Wilmington Campaign, from the First Battle of Fort Fisher on December 24, 1864, through the campaign's end on February 22, 1865. He was severely wounded and received treatment at a hospital in Portsmouth, Virginia. For his actions during the campaign, he was awarded the Medal of Honor months later on June 22, 1865.

McWilliams' official Medal of Honor citation reads:

Served on board the U.S.S. Pontoosuc during the capture of Fort Fisher and Wilmington, 24 December 1864, to 22 February 1865. Carrying out his duties faithfully throughout this period, McWilliams was so severely wounded in the assault upon Fort Fisher that he was sent to the hospital at Portsmouth, Va. McWilliams was recommended for his gallantry, skill and coolness in action while under the fire of the enemy.

McWilliams died on August 11, 1900, at age 57 and was buried at Ida Grove Cemetery in Ida Grove, Iowa.
