= Second Battle of Fort Fisher order of battle =

The order of battle for the Second Battle of Fort Fisher includes:

- Second Battle of Fort Fisher order of battle: Confederate
- Second Battle of Fort Fisher order of battle: Union

== See also ==
- First Battle of Fort Fisher order of battle
