= John P. Erickson =

- Civil War era Navy Medal of Honor
- Born: June 30, 1825; Sweden
- Died: August 2, 1907 (aged 81–82); Brooklyn, New York, US
- Burial place: Green-Wood Cemetery, Brooklyn, New York
- Military career
- Allegiance: United States
- Branch: United States Navy
- Rank: Captain of the Forecastle
- Unit: (United States Navy) USS Pontoosuc
- Conflicts: American Civil War • Wilmington Campaign
- Awards: Medal of Honor

John P. Erickson (June 30, 1825 – August 2, 1907) was a Union Navy sailor in the American Civil War and a recipient of the U.S. military's highest decoration, the Medal of Honor, for his actions during the Wilmington Campaign.

Born in 1825 in Sweden, Erickson immigrated to the U.S. and was living in Brooklyn when he joined the Navy. He served as a captain of the forecastle on the USS Pontoosuc in the Wilmington Campaign, from the First Battle of Fort Fisher on December 24, 1864, through the campaign's end on February 22, 1865. He was severely wounded and received treatment at a hospital in Portsmouth, Virginia. For his actions during the campaign, he was awarded the Medal of Honor months later on June 22, 1865.

Erickson's official Medal of Honor citation reads:

The President of the United States of America, in the name of Congress, takes pleasure in presenting the Medal of Honor to Captain of the Forecastle John P. Erickson, United States Navy, for extraordinary heroism in action while serving on board the U.S.S. Pontoosuc during the capture of Fort Fisher and Wilmington, North Carolina, 24 December 1864, to 22 February 1865. Carrying out his duties faithfully throughout this period, Captain of the Forecastle Erickson was so severely wounded in the assault upon Fort Fisher that he was sent to the hospital at Portsmouth, Virginia. Erickson was recommended for his gallantry, skill, and coolness in action while under the fire of the enemy.

Erickson died on August 2, 1907, at age 82 and was buried at Green-Wood Cemetery in Brooklyn.

== See also ==
- List of Medal of Honor recipients
- Wilmington Campaign
- First Battle of Fort Fisher
