= John W. Ames =

John W. Ames may refer to

- John W. Ames (politician) (1793–1833), American politician
- John W. Ames (colonel) (1833–1878), Union Army colonel
