= Asa Betham =

American sailor

- Born: c. 1838; New York City, New York, USA
- Military career
- Allegiance: United States of America; Union
- Branch: United States Navy; Union Navy
- Rank: Coxswain
- Unit: USS Pontoosuc (1864)
- Conflicts: American Civil War • Second Battle of Fort Fisher
- Awards: Medal of Honor

Asa Betham (c. 1838 – unknown) was a sailor in the U.S. Navy during the American Civil War. He received the Medal of Honor for his actions during the Second Battle of Fort Fisher on January 15, 1865.

== Military service ==
Betham enlisted in the Navy from New York City in July 1861, and was assigned to the Union side-wheel gunboat USS Pontoosuc (1864).

On January 15, 1865, the North Carolina Confederate stronghold of Fort Fisher was taken by a combined Union storming party of sailors, marines, and soldiers under the command of Admiral David Dixon Porter and General Alfred Terry. Betham was a member of the naval storming party.

== Medal of Honor citation ==
The President of the United States of America, in the name of Congress, takes pleasure in presenting the Medal of Honor to Coxswain Asa Betham, United States Navy, for extraordinary heroism in action while serving on board the U.S.S. Pontoosuc during the capture of Fort Fisher and Wilmington, North Carolina, 24 December 1864, to 22 January 1865. Carrying out his duties faithfully during this period, Coxswain Betham was recommended for gallantry and skill and for his cool courage while under the fire of the enemy throughout these various actions.

General Orders: War Department, General Orders No. 59 (June 22, 1865)

Action Date: January 15, 1865

Service: Navy

Rank: Coxswain

Division: U.S.S. Pontoosuc

== See also ==
- List of American Civil War Medal of Honor recipients: A–F
- List of Medal of Honor recipients for the Second Battle of Fort Fisher
