= John Anglin =

John Anglin may refer to:

- John Anglin (criminal) (1930–?), American criminal who escaped in 1962 from Alcatraz Federal Penitentiary
- John Anglin (sailor) (1850–1905), cabin boy in US Navy, received Medal of Honor
