= Kenmure (Norfolk, Virginia) =

Historic house in Virginia, United States

- U.S. National Register of Historic Places
- Virginia Landmarks Register
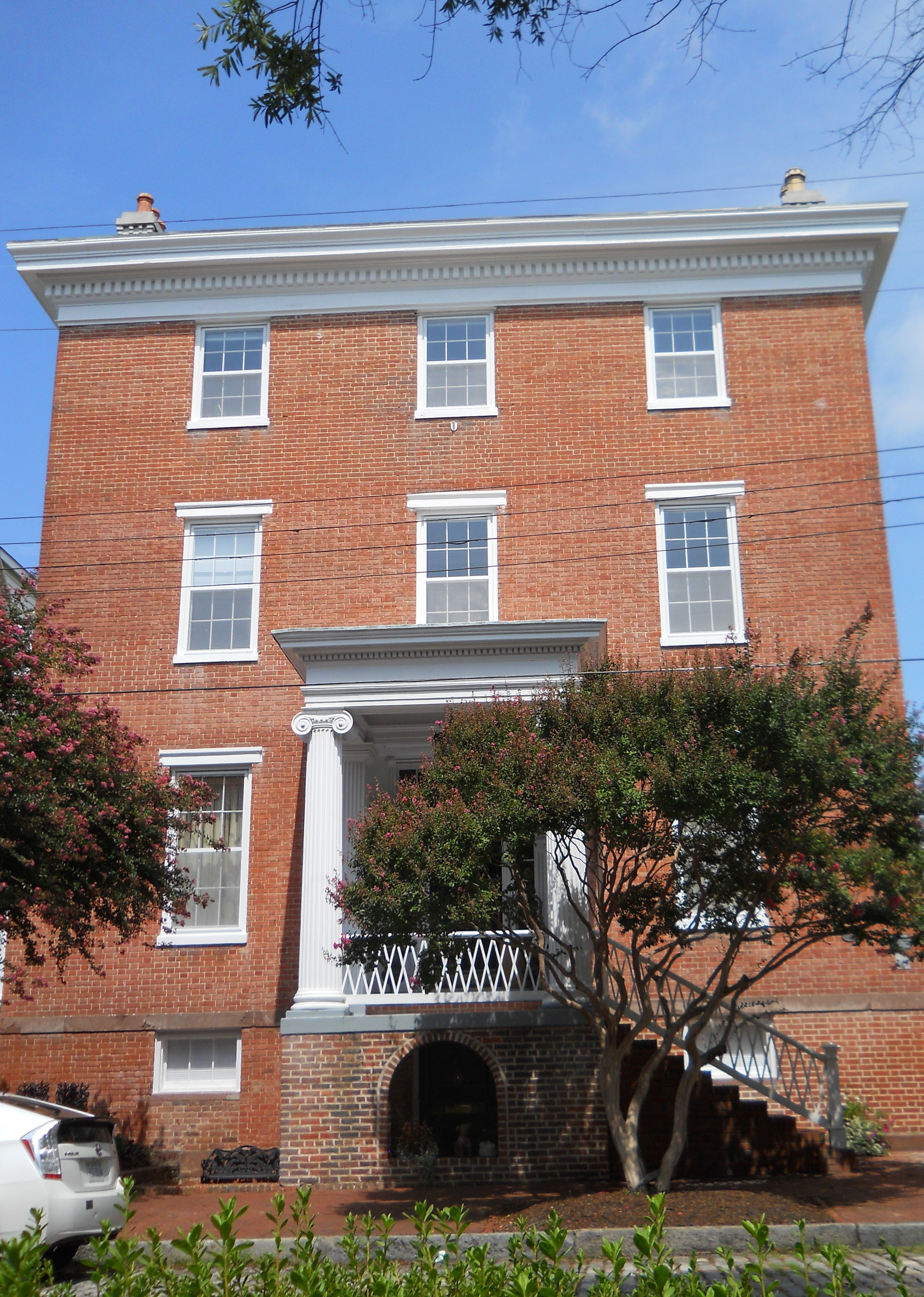
- Kenmure, September 2013

- Location within Virginia
- Location: 420 W. Bute St., Norfolk, Virginia
- Coordinates: 36°51′10″N 76°17′49″W
- Area: less than one acre
- Built: 1845, 1845
- Architectural style: Greek Revival
- NRHP reference No.: 88000601
- VLR No.: 122-0016

Significant dates
- Added to NRHP: June 1, 1988
- Designated VLR: December 8, 1987

Kenmure, also known as the William Lamb House, is an urban antebellum home located in Norfolk, Virginia, United States, in the historic West Freemason District, at 420 West Bute Street. It derives its name from the Scottish family estate.

== Design ==
Originally constructed in 1845 as a three-bay, Greek Revival brick town house, it consisted of two floors measuring 40'x40' above an English basement, with brick and wood walls, 15 fireplaces, two front parlors, living room and a kitchen outbuilding.

Kenmure was expanded to three-stories in 1855 with a central one-bay dwarf portico, a rear addition and a low, hipped roof topped by a three-bay cupola.

Its site was originally a half block, located next to the Elizabeth River, between Bute and Botetourt Streets.

== Original history ==
Kenmure was built for Margaret Kerr Lamb and William Wilson Lamb, a banker, shipper, cotton and rail merchant. The Lambs had two children, William Wilson Lamb and Mary Content Lamb Donnell.

Marking the second generation when Lambs served as mayor of Norfolk, William Wilson Lamb served as mayor of Norfolk from 1858 to 1862 during the Civil War. As Norfolk surrendered the city to Union soldiers, Lamb secreted Norfolk's historic silver mace — which had been handed down from each mayor since first presented to Norfolk by Royal Lieutenant Governor Robert Dinwiddie in 1754 — under the hearth stone of the upstairs children's room. Union soldiers would subsequently occupy the house, without discovering the hidden mace.

Lamb's son Colonel William Lamb would later own Kenmure. Colonel Lamb described Kenmure as

a typical southern home of these antebellum days, where besides the 'white folks' there was a colony of family servants from the pickaninnys just able to crawl to the old gray-headed mammy who nursed 'old massa.' It was an ideal home for a boy: sail and row boats on the shore for sailing and fishing, horses in the stable for riding and driving, peaches, pears, cherries, figs, pomegranates, raspberries, currants in the garden, and roses, pink lilacs, snowballs, hollyhock and all the dear old-time flowers with which to treat his girl and boy friends – with a lovely lawn, bordered with crepe myrtles, bayberry and calycanthus between the mansion house and the river, upon which to romp and wrestle and to enjoy those outdoor games which the children of the founders of Norfolk town in 1682 brought from the motherland.

== Later history ==
The house was sold in 1894, 1897 and 1906, becoming a boarding house by 1918, and was unoccupied by the 1920s. In the 1930s Kenmure was subdivided into five apartments. It was occupied by vagrants when architect Frederick Herman and his wife Dr. Lucy Spigel Herman, a learning disabilities specialist, purchased the house in 1976. The Hermans began its restoration, re-configuring the house as a single family residence above offices on the basement and first floor levels.

In the 1980s the basement and first floor accommodated the architectural firm Herman had co-founded with his father-in-law Bernard (Bernie) Betzig Spigel and August (Augie) Zinkl. The firm operated as Spigel, Carter, Zinkl and Herman, and later as Spigel Herman and Chapman with partner Donald E. Chapman. A basement-level antique store was operated by Sydney and Faith Nusbaum.

Historic easements were added by the Hermans. Kenmure was listed on the National Register of Historic Places in 1988. It was purchased by Stephen and Vanessa Sigmon in 2007, who further restored the house, returning it to a single family residence.
