= Second Battle of Fort Fisher order of battle: Confederate =

Historical US military battle

The following Confederate units and commanders fought in the Second Battle of Fort Fisher (January 13–15, 1865) of the American Civil War. The Union order of battle is listed separately. Order of battle compiled from the army organization during the expedition.

== Abbreviations used ==
=== Military rank ===
- MG = Major General
- BG = Brigadier General
- Col = Colonel
- Ltc = Lieutenant Colonel
- Maj = Major
- Cpt = Captain
- Lt = 1st Lieutenant
- Bvt = Brevet

== Confederate Forces ==
=== District of North Carolina ===
Gen. Braxton Bragg

Division	Brigade	Regiments and Others
District of Cape Fear MG William H. C. Whiting (mw)	Fort Fisher Col William Lamb (w); Maj James Reilly	10th North Carolina – Maj. James Reilly; 36th North Carolina – Col. William Lamb; 40th North Carolina; 1st Battalion North Carolina Heavy Artillery, Co. D – Cpt. James L. McCormic (mw); 3rd Battalion North Carolina Light Artillery, Co. C – Cpt. John M. Sutton; 13th Battalion North Carolina Light Artillery, Co. D – Cpt. Zachariah T. Adams; Confederate Navy Detachment – Cpt. Robert T. Chapman; Confederate Marine Corps Detachment – Cpt. A.C. Van Benthuysen
Hoke's Division MG Robert F. Hoke	Clignman's Brigade Col Hector McKethan	8th North Carolina – Ltc. Rufus A. Barrier; 31st North Carolina – Ltc. Charles Knight; 51st North Carolina – Cpt. James W. Lippitt; 61st North Carolina – Col. William S. Devane
Hoke's Division MG Robert F. Hoke	Colquitt's Brigade BG Alfred H. Colquitt	6th Georgia – Col. John T. Lofton (k); 19th Georgia – Col. James H. Neal; 23rd Georgia – Col. Marcus R. Ballenger; 27th Georgia – Cpt. Elisha D. Graham; 28th Georgia – Cpt. John A. Johnson
Hoke's Division MG Robert F. Hoke	Hagood's Brigade Col Robert F. Graham	7th South Carolina Battalion – Ltc. James H. Rion; 11th South Carolina – Col. F. Hay Gantt; 21st South Carolina – Cpt. D.G. DuBose; 25th South Carolina – Cpt. James Carson; 27th South Carolina
Hoke's Division MG Robert F. Hoke	Kirkland's Brigade BG William Kirkland	17th North Carolina – Ltc. Thomas H. Sharp; 42nd North Carolina – Col. John E. Brown; 66th North Carolina – Col. John H. Nethercutt
Hoke's Division MG Robert F. Hoke	Cavalry	2nd South Carolina – Col. Thomas J. Lipscomb
Hoke's Division MG Robert F. Hoke	Artillery	3rd Battalion North Carolina Light Artillery, Co. A – Cpt. Andrew J. Ellis; Southerland's North Carolina Battery – Cpt. Thomas J. Southerland; Paris's (Virginia) Battery, Staunton Hill Artillery – Cpt. Andrew B. Paris

== See also ==
- North Carolina in the American Civil War
