= Decatur Dorsey =

American soldier in the American Civil War (1836–1891)

- Medal of Honor, 1862–1895 Army version
- Born: c. 1836; Howard County, Maryland, U.S.
- Died: July 11, 1891 (aged 54–55); Hoboken, New Jersey, U.S.
- Burial place: Flower Hill Cemetery, North Bergen, New Jersey
- Military career
- Allegiance: United States of America; Union
- Branch: United States Army; Union Army
- Service years: 1864–65
- Rank: First Sergeant
- Unit: 39th United States Colored Infantry
- Conflicts: American Civil War • Battle of the Crater
- Awards: Medal of Honor

Decatur Dorsey (c. 1836 – July 11, 1891) was a Union Army soldier in the American Civil War and a recipient of the U.S. military's highest decoration, the Medal of Honor, for his actions at the Battle of the Crater. Born into slavery, Dorsey enlisted in the United States Colored Troops and served through the last year of the war.

== Biography ==
=== Early life ===
Decatur Dorsey was born into slavery around 1836 in what is now Howard County, Maryland. Dorsey, who was also known as Cato, may have been a enslaved to Upton Welsh, who died in July 1858. In October 1858, Dorsey was enslaved by Upton Welsh's son, Napoleon B. Welsh. The Welshes lived near Gaither's Siding in Howard County. In 1858, Dorsey and another enslaved person were convicted of burglarizing a store located in Woodbine, Carroll County. He was then sentenced to serve two years eight months in the Maryland penitentiary. Prior to his committal to the prison, Dorsey escaped, but was recaptured in Baltimore. Dorsey completed his prison term in May 1861. At the time, Maryland law provided that upon the expiration of a slave's prison term, they were to be sold at auction and removed from the state. Dorsey was sold as a slave by the State of Maryland to Edward Rider, Jr. of Baltimore County.

=== Military career ===
On March 26, 1864, Decatur Dorsey enlisted in Company B of the 39th United States Colored Infantry as a private, but was promoted to corporal less than two months later, on May 17. Dorsey enlisted in the Army as a free man even though he had not been freed by Rider and was still a slave. (Rider would later be paid a $100 bounty as a result of Dorsey's enlistment).

On July 30, 1864, Dorsey took part in the Battle of the Crater in Petersburg, Virginia. With the Siege of Petersburg at a stalemate, Union forces hoped to break the city's defenses by detonating explosives in a tunnel dug beneath the Confederate lines and charging the enemy positions in the aftermath of the explosion. The blast blew a huge crater in the Confederate defenses, and white Union soldiers rushed in to attack. Men who entered the crater became trapped as the Confederates regrouped and began firing down at them.

Dorsey's division, which had been held in reserve, was then ordered to reinforce the attack. Dorsey, serving as the 39th Regiment's color bearer, moved ahead of his unit during the advance and planted the flag on the Confederate fortifications. When the regiment was forced to pull back, he retrieved the flag and rallied his fellow soldiers for a second attack. In this second assault, the men of the 39th breached the Confederate works and engaged in hand-to-hand combat with the defenders. They captured two hundred prisoners and two flags before being pushed back again and ordered to withdraw.

Dorsey was promoted to sergeant on August 1, two days after the battle, and again to first sergeant on January 1, 1865. He was awarded the Medal of Honor on November 8, 1865, for his actions at the Battle of the Crater and was discharged from the Army a month later, on December 4, while in Wilmington, North Carolina.

=== Later life ===
After the war, Dorsey returned to Baltimore, where he married Mannie Christie on January 4, 1866. In January 1868, he was charged by Baltimore police with stealing a wagon. By 1870 Dorsey had moved to New York City with his wife. In late 1870 he was convicted of stealing carpets from his employer and was incarcerated in Sing Sing Prison for three years. After his release, Dorsey moved to Hoboken, New Jersey, where he resided the rest of his life. He worked at various occupations, including cook, sailor, and laborer. Dorsey died in Hoboken on July 11, 1891, at the approximate age of 55. He was buried at Flower Hill Cemetery in North Bergen, New Jersey. Dorsey does not appear to have been survived by any children.

== Medal of Honor citation ==
Planted his colors on the Confederate works in advance of his regiment, and when the regiment was driven back to the Union works he carried the colors there and bravely rallied the men.

== See also ==
- List of African-American Medal of Honor recipients
- List of American Civil War Medal of Honor recipients: A–F
