= Richard Gasson =

- Born: 1842; Ireland
- Died: September 29, 1864 (aged 21–22); Henrico County, Virginia, US
- Military career
- Allegiance: United States of America
- Branch: United States Army; Union Army
- Service years: 1861–1864
- Rank: Sergeant
- Units: (New York (state)) Company K, 47th New York Infantry
- Conflicts: American Civil War: Battle of Chaffin's Farm
- Awards: Medal of Honor

Richard Gasson (1842 – September 29, 1864) was an American soldier who fought in the American Civil War. Gasson posthumously received the United States' highest award for bravery during combat, the Medal of Honor. Gasson's medal was won for his actions during the Battle of Chaffin's Farm in Henrico County, Virginia on September 29, 1864. Gasson was killed during the battle. He was honored with the award on June 22, 1896.

Gasson was born in Ireland, and his registered home was in New York City at the time of the Civil War.

== Medal of Honor citation ==
The President of the United States of America, in the name of Congress, takes pride in presenting the Medal of Honor (Posthumously) to Sergeant Richard Gasson, United States Army, for extraordinary heroism on 29 September 1864, while serving with Company K, 47th New York Infantry, in action at Chapin's Farm, Virginia. Sergeant Gasson fell dead while planting the colors of his regiment on the enemy's works.

== See also ==
- List of American Civil War Medal of Honor recipients: G–L
