= John Anglin (sailor) =

Union Navy Medal of Honor recipient

- Born: October 6, 1850; Portland, Maine, US
- Died: September 6, 1905 (aged 54); Portland, Maine, US
- Burial place: Calvary Cemetery, Portland, Maine
- Military career
- Allegiance: United States; Union
- Branch: United States Navy; Union Navy
- Rank: Cabin boy
- Unit: USS Pontoosuc (1864)
- Conflicts: American Civil War • Second Battle of Fort Fisher
- Awards: Medal of Honor

John Anglin (October 6, 1850 – September 6, 1905) was a sailor in the U.S. Navy during the American Civil War. He received the Medal of Honor for his actions during the Second Battle of Fort Fisher on January 15, 1865. His last name is often misspelled Angling. He was one of the youngest ever Medal of Honor recipients.

== Military service ==
Anglin volunteered for service in the U.S. Navy and was assigned as a Cabin Boy to the Union side-wheel gunboat USS Pontoosuc (1864). His enlistment is credited to the state of Maine.

On January 15, 1865, the North Carolina Confederate stronghold of Fort Fisher was taken by a combined Union storming party of sailors, marines, and soldiers under the command of Admiral David Dixon Porter and General Alfred Terry. Fourteen-year-old Anglin was exposed to enemy fire while serving on the deck of the USS Pontoosuc.

Anglin died in Portland, Maine, on September 6, 1905, at the age of 54. He was buried in Calvary Cemetery in South Portland, Maine.

== Medal of Honor citation ==
The President of the United States of America, in the name of Congress, takes pleasure in presenting the Medal of Honor to Cabin Boy John Angling, [sic] United States Navy, for extraordinary heroism in action while serving on board the U.S.S. Pontoosuc during the capture of Fort Fisher and Wilmington, North Carolina, 24 December 1864 to 22 January 1865. Carrying out his duties faithfully during this period, Cabin Boy Angling [sic] was recommended for gallantry and skill and for his cool courage while under the fire of the enemy throughout these various actions.

General Orders: War Department, General Orders No. 59 (June 22, 1865)

Action Date: January 15, 1865

Service: Navy

Rank: Cabin Boy

Division: U.S.S. Pontoosuc

== See also ==
- List of Medal of Honor recipients
- List of American Civil War Medal of Honor recipients: A–F
- List of Medal of Honor recipients for the Second Battle of Fort Fisher
