= Delavan Bates =

U.S. Army Medal of Honor recipient

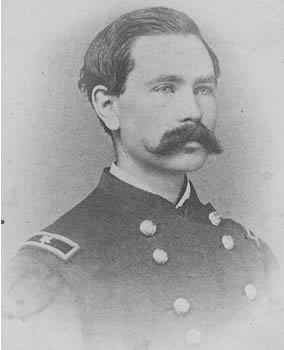
- Bvt. Brig. Gen. Delavan Bates
- Born: March 17, 1840; Schoharie County, New York
- Died: December 19, 1918 (aged 78); Aurora, Nebraska
- Burial place: Aurora Cemetery, Aurora, Nebraska
- Military career
- Allegiance: United States of America
- Branch: United States Army; Union Army
- Service years: 1862 - 1865
- Rank: Colonel; Brevet Brigadier General
- Units: (New York (state)) 121st Regiment New York Volunteer Infantry; 30th United States Colored Infantry
- Conflicts: Battle of the Crater
- Awards: Medal of Honor

Delavan Bates (March 17, 1840 – December 19, 1918) was an American soldier who fought in the American Civil War. Bates was awarded the country's highest award for bravery during combat, the Medal of Honor, for his action on Cemetery Hill in Petersburg, Virginia during the Battle of the Crater on 30 July 1864. He was honored with the award on 22 June 1891.

== Biography ==
Bates was born to Alpheus Bates (1808 - 1888) and Hannah Bates (1810 - 1901) on 17 March 1840. Bates enlisted with the 121st New York Infantry in August 1862. He was captured at the Battle of Salem Church during the Second Battle of Fredericksburg, part of the Chancellorsville Campaign and was held at Libby Prison in Richmond, Virginia for approximately two weeks. He was subsequently released in a prison exchange. He was also involved in the battles of Chancellorsville and Gettysburg.

Bates became colonel of the 30th United States Colored Infantry (USCI) in March 1864 While leading his troops in the Battle of the Crater on 30 July 1864, he was seriously wounded about his chest and arms, in addition to receiving a bullet in the face. Bates survived these injuries and was among 23 troops to receive the Medal of honor for bravery during the battle. By the end of the war Bates had been promoted to Brevet Brigadier General and was the commander of the 1st Brigade, 1st Division of the XXV Corps which was composed of the 1st USCI, 27th USCI and the 30th USCI. He honorably mustered out in December 1865.

After the war Bates resided in Salisbury, North Carolina but soon returned to West Richmondville, New York where he married Lana Ann Green on 2 January 1870, with whom he had five children. He was a merchant and storekeeper.

Bates died in Aurora, Nebraska on December 18, 1918 and his remains are interred at Aurora Cemetery.

== Medal of Honor citation ==
For gallantry in action where he fell, shot through the face, at the head of his regiment.

== See also ==
- List of American Civil War Medal of Honor recipients: A–F
