= Rufus Daggett =

Union Army brigadier general (1837–1912)

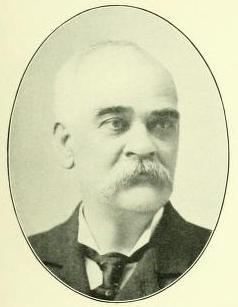
- Born: October 6, 1837; New Berlin, New York, U.S.
- Died: February 9, 1912 (aged 74); Utica, New York, U.S.
- Military career
- Allegiance: United States
- Branch: Union Army
- Rank: Colonel; Brevet Brigadier General
- Units: 14th New York Volunteer Infantry Regiment; 117th New York Volunteer Infantry Regiment
- Conflicts: American Civil War

Rufus Daggett (October 6, 1837 – February 9, 1912) was a Union Army officer during the American Civil War. On February 18, 1865, President Abraham Lincoln nominated Daggett for appointment to the grade of brevet brigadier general of volunteers, to rank from January 15, 1865, and the United States Senate confirmed the appointment on March 3, 1865.

Born in New Berlin, New York on October 6, 1837, Daggett first served in the Union Army as a first lieutenant with the 14th New York Volunteer Infantry Regiment from May 17, 1861, until he was mustered out of the volunteers on December 4, 1861. He returned to the army and was appointed major, August 20, 1862, lieutenant colonel, September 5, 1863, and colonel, August 12, 1864, of the 117th New York Volunteer Infantry Regiment. He commanded a brigade in the Army of the James from September 17, 1864, to September 29, 1864, when he was wounded in fighting at Fort Gilmer, Virginia during the Battle of Chaffin's Farm and New Market Heights. He returned to service as a brevet brigadier general to lead brigades in the XXIV Corps (Union Army) from January 15, 1865, to March 13, 1865, and the X Corps (Union Army) in the Department of North Carolina from March 27, 1865, to May 13, 1865, and a division in the X Corps from May 13, 1865, to June 8, 1865, when he was mustered out of the volunteers.

After the war, he ran a clothing business and later a hardware store. In 1900, he returned to Utica and was appointed postmaster. He had been a Republican.

Rufus Daggett died February 12, 1912, at Utica, New York. He was interred at New Forest Cemetery in Utica.

== See also ==
- List of American Civil War brevet generals (Union)
