= 2nd Connecticut Infantry Regiment =

- Active: May 7, 1861 - August 7, 1861
- Country: United States
- Allegiance: Union
- Branch: Infantry
- Engagements: First Battle of Bull Run

The 2nd Connecticut Infantry Regiment was an infantry regiment that served in the Union Army during the American Civil War.

== Service ==
The 2nd Connecticut Infantry Regiment was organized at New Haven, Connecticut and mustered in for three-months service on May 7, 1861, under the command of Colonel Alfred Howe Terry. Their rifle companies were issued Sharps rifles from state stocks.

The regiment was attached to Mansfield's command, Department of Washington, to June 1861. Key's 1st Brigade, Tyler's Division, McDowell's Army of Northeastern Virginia to August 1861. They fought at the Battle of Bull Run before returning to Connecticut.

The 2nd Connecticut Infantry mustered out of service on August 7, 1861.

== Detailed service ==
Left Connecticut for Washington, D.C., May 19. Duty at Fort Corcoran, defenses of Washington, D.C., until June 1. Advanced to Vienna and Falls Church, Virginia, June 1–3, and picket duty there until July 16. Advanced on Manassas, Virginia, July 16–21. Occupation of Fairfax Court House July 17. Battle of Bull Run July 21.

== Commanders ==
- Colonel Alfred Howe Terry

== See also ==
- Connecticut in the American Civil War
- List of Connecticut Civil War units
