= USS Pequot (1863) =

Gunboat of the United States Navy

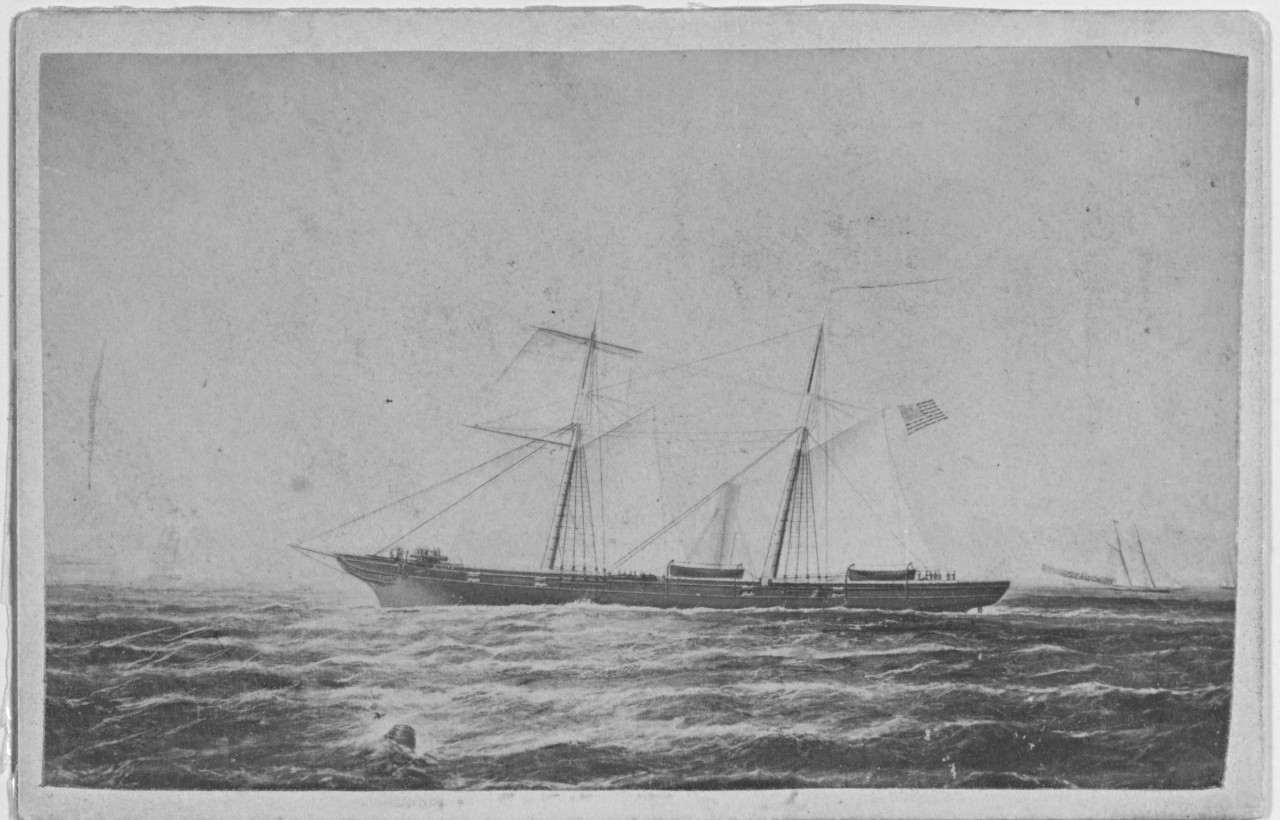
- USS Pequot.

History

United States
- Name: USS Pequot
- Namesake: Pequot tribe
- Launched: 4 June 1863
- Commissioned: 15 January 1864
- Decommissioned: 3 June 1865
- Fate: Sold, 1869

General characteristics
- Type: Gunboat
- Length: 190 ft (58 m)
- Beam: 29 ft (8.8 m)
- Draft: 12 ft (3.7 m)
- Speed: 11 knots (20 km/h; 13 mph)
- Complement: 130
- Armament: 1 × 50-pounder gun; 1 × 30-pounder Parrott rifle; 6 × 32-pounder guns; 2 × 24-pounder howitzers; 1 × heavy 12-pounder gun; 1 × 12-pounder rifle

The first USS Pequot was a wooden screw gunboat of the Union Navy during the American Civil War. The ship was launched on 4 June 1863 by the Boston Navy Yard; and commissioned there on 15 January 1864, Lt. Comdr. Stephen P. Quackenbush in command. The ship was named for the Pequot Indian tribe resident in Southern Connecticut, members of the Algonquian language grouping.

== Service history ==
The new gunboat departed Boston on 5 February and joined the North Atlantic Blockading Squadron. She captured British blockade runner Don off Beaufort, North Carolina, on 4 March, and helped the Army beat back a Confederate attack on Wilson's Wharf, James River, Virginia, on 24 May. Blockade duty occupied her until she participated in the first and the second battles on Fort Fisher which protected Wilmington, North Carolina, on 24 February 1864 and 13 January 1865, closing that last major Confederate port. She followed this victory by helping capture Fort Anderson, North Carolina.

== Post-war ==
After the end of the Civil War, she was decommissioned at the New York Navy Yard on 3 June 1865. She remained there in reserve until she was sold to Haiti in 1869, where the ship was renamed Terreur. In December of that year, she was captured by rebels. Terreur was then used to blow up the presidential palace by hitting the barrels of gunpowder stored within.
