= John W. Ames (colonel) =

American Civil War officer (1833–1878)

John Worthington Ames
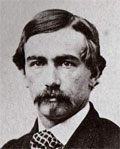
- Born: November 23, 1833; Lowell, Massachusetts, U.S.
- Died: April 6, 1878 (aged 44); San Rafael, California, U.S.
- Burial place: Mount Tamalpais Cemetery, San Rafael, California
- Education: Harvard University
- Spouse: Margaret Corlis Plumly (m. 1865–1878)
- Military career
- Allegiance: United States (Union)
- Branch: United States Army (Union Army)
- Service years: 1861–1865
- Rank: Colonel; Bvt. Brigadier General
- Unit: 11th Infantry Regiment
- Commands: 6th United States Colored Infantry Regiment
- Conflicts: American Civil War; Peninsula campaign; Battle of Gaines' Mill; Gettysburg campaign; Battle of Gettysburg; Richmond–Petersburg campaign; Battle of Chaffin's Farm (WIA); Wilmington campaigns; First Battle of Fort Fisher

John Worthington Ames (November 23, 1833 – April 6, 1878) was an American Brevet Brigadier General and engineer who participated in the American Civil War. He commanded the 6th United States Colored Infantry Regiment throughout the war, previously being within the 11th Infantry Regiment.

== Early life ==
John was born on November 23, 1833, at Lowell, Massachusetts. He was the son of Seth Ames (1805–1881) and Margaret Stevenson Bradford (a daughter of Gamaliel Bradford of the Continental Army).

He spent his early career attending schools at Cambridge, Massachusetts, beginning with the Hopkins School before entering the Scientific School of Harvard University and graduating in September 1854.

== Career ==
He then travelled to Shanghai, China in December 1854 before becoming a civil engineer at Allen's Grove, Wisconsin on May 14, 1857. In 1859, he became a land surveyor at Bloomington, Illinois under the firm of Haven & Ames. He then spent eight months at Texas as an engineer on the Buffalo, Bayou, Brazos & Colorado River Railroad.

=== American Civil War ===
On the outbreak of the American Civil War, Ames became a captain in the 11th Infantry Regiment on May 14, 1861. Ames was brevetted to Major for "gallantry in action" during the Battle of Gaines' Mill. On September 28, 1863, Ames accepted a commission to be given command of the 6th United States Colored Infantry Regiment as a colonel of the regiment. Ames was wounded during the Battle of Chaffin's Farm while commanding the Third Brigade of the Second Division of the XVIII Corps. On January 15, 1865, he was brevetted to Brigadier General for his services throughout the war. After the end of the war, Ames was mustered out on September 20, 1865, at Wilmington, North Carolina.

Ames said of his reason for fighting the war:

Slavery has brought death into our own households already in its wicked rebellion…There is but one way [to win the war] and that is emancipation…I want to sing ‘John Brown’ in the streets of Charleston, and ram red-hot abolitionism down their unwilling throats at the point of the bayonet.

=== Later career ===
After marrying, Ames becoming employed at the Burlington & Missouri Railroad in Iowa as Ames moved to Burlington, Iowa, before moving to San Francisco to become a Surveyor-general. Ames was also an author of various magazines and newspapers, mostly about his service during the American Civil War.

== Personal life ==
On May 17, 1865, Ames married Margaret Corlis Plumly, a daughter of Benjamin Rush Plumley and Rebecca (née Wilson) Plumley. Together, they were the parents of:

- Frances Margaret Bradford Ames (b. 1866)
- Rebecca Worthington Ruby Ames (b. 1868)
- John Worthington Ames (1871–1954), a prominent architect who trained at Harvard and at the École des Beaux-Arts before going into practice with Edwin Dodge.

Ames died on April 6, 1878, at San Rafael, California and was buried at Mount Tamalpais Cemetery.

== See also ==
- List of American Civil War brevet generals (Union)
