= USS Pontoosuc =

Gunboat of the United States Navy

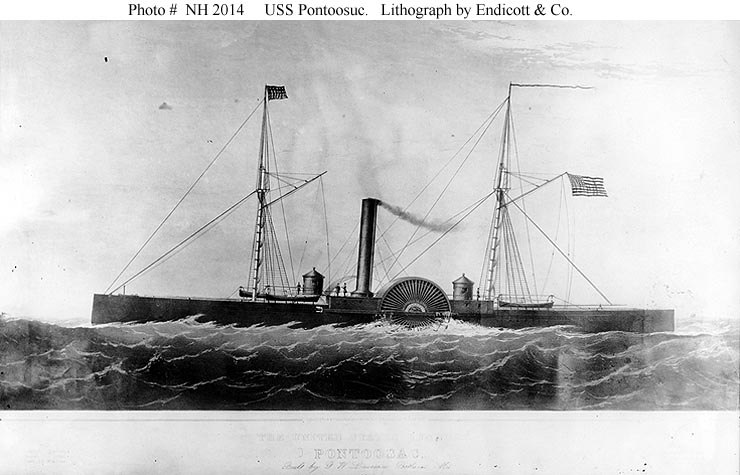
- Lithograph published by Endicott & Co., New York, circa 1865. Collection of Commander Charles Moran, USNRF, 1935.

History

United States
- Name: USS Pontoosuc
- Laid down: 1863
- Commissioned: 10 May 1864
- Decommissioned: 5 July 1865
- Fate: Sold, 3 October 1866

General characteristics
- Class & type: Sassacus-class gunboat
- Tonnage: 974
- Length: 205 ft (62 m)
- Beam: 35 ft (11 m)
- Draft: 9 ft (2.7 m)
- Depth of hold: 11 ft 6 in (3.51 m)
- Propulsion: Steam engine, side wheels
- Speed: 11 knots (20 km/h; 13 mph)
- Complement: 100+
- Armament: 2 × 100-pounder Parrott rifles; 4 × 9 in (230 mm) Dahlgren smoothbore guns; 2 × 20-pounder Parrott rifles; 1 × 12-pounder smoothbore; 1 × 12-pounder rifle; 2 × 24-pounder howitzers
- Armor: 4 in (100 mm)

USS Pontoosuc was a Union Navy vessel in the American Civil War. A side wheel gunboat, Pontoosuc was built under contract with G. W. Lawrence and the Portland Company, Portland, Maine, and was named for Pontoosuc, Illinois, on the Mississippi River. She was commissioned at Portland on 10 May 1864 with Lieutenant Commander George A. Stevens in command.

== Service history ==
Ordered to the South Atlantic Blockading Squadron on 9 June 1864, she soon returned north and on 12 August departed New York in pursuit of the Confederate raider CSS Tallahassee. Arriving at Halifax soon after 0600 on 20 August, she discovered her quarry had sailed. Underway immediately, Pontoosuc continued her search to the north among the fishing fleets in the Gulf of Saint Lawrence. Tallahassee, however, had turned south en route back to Wilmington, North Carolina.

Pontoosuc returned to New York on 30 August 1864 and took up escort duties. By mid-December, she had resumed blockade duties, off Wilmington. On 24 and 25 December she participated in the assault on Fort Fisher, returning to shell the Fort again in the successful mid-January 1865 attack. In February she moved up the Cape Fear River for operations against Fort Anderson. After the fall of Wilmington she resumed cruising off the coast. Seven of Pontoosuc's sailors received the Medal of Honor for their actions during this campaign: Cabin Boy John Anglin, Coxswain Asa Betham, Boatswain's Mate Robert M. Blair, Captain of the Forecastle John P. Erickson, Landsman George W. McWilliams, Chief Quartermaster James W. Verney, and Sailmaker's Mate Anthony Williams.

After the war, she returned to Boston where she was decommissioned 5 July 1865 and was sold 3 October 1866.
