= 14th New York Infantry Regiment =

- Active: 17 May 1861 – 24 May 1863
- Country: United States of America
- Allegiance: Union
- Branch: Union Army
- Type: Infantry
- Nickname(s): "1st Oneida County Regiment"
- Engagements: American Civil War: Hanover Court House; Beaver Dam Creek; Gaines' Mill; Malvern Hill; Antietam; Fredericksburg; Chancellorsville

Commanders
- Notable commanders: Col. James McQuade

The 14th New York Infantry Regiment was a New York infantry regiment, active for two years from May 1861 to May 1863 during the American Civil War. The regiment was part of the Union Army, and was raised primarily from Oneida County, with some companies also raised from Onondaga County; Columbia County; and Lewis County.

== Organization ==
In May 1862, the 14th New York Volunteer Infantry was assigned to second brigade, first division, V Corps, Army of the Potomac where it would serve from the Peninsula Campaign through Chancellorsville.

The companies of the 14th New York Volunteer Infantry were raised from the following locales:

- Company A - Utica
- Company B - Utica
- Company C - Utica
- Company E - Utica
- Company F - Boonville; Forestport; and Port Leyden
- Company G - Rome
- Company H - Syracuse
- Company I - Lowville
- Company K - Hudson

== Combat History ==
The regiment existed from 1861 until 1863, at which time the "two year men" were discharged, and the "three year men" were transferred to the 44th New York Volunteer Infantry Regiment.

The 14th New York Volunteer Infantry experienced 270 casualties during its two year existence with the Army of the Potomac. The 14th New York Volunteer Infantry saw the bulk of its action during the Seven Days Battles. The regiment was engaged at Beaver Dam Creek, Gaines' Mill 25 June 1862, and was involved in the defense of the Union left flank at the Battle of Malvern Hill 30 June 1862 under Brigadier General Charles Griffin. In these engagements, and particularly in the Battle of Gaines's Mill the regiment suffered 225 dead and wounded, which comprise 83% of the total of 270 casualties suffered during the 14th's civil war service.

During the Battle of Antietam, the regiment was held in reserve approximately one mile east of the Middle Bridge; most of the rest of the Union V Corps was also held in reserve on 17 September 1862.

During the Battle of Fredericksburg, the regiment was involved in the assaults on the Confederate positions atop Marye's Heights on 13 December 1862, but their involvement was marginal and the regiment did not receive losses as great as other units, having 5 dead and 30 wounded.

The men who had enlisted in the 14th in 1861 for 2 years were mustered out in June 1863 but the "three years' men" of the 14th were joined to the 44th New York Volunteer Infantry Regiment by transfer just in time to be engaged in the 44th Regiment's intense combat at Little Round Top during the Battle of Gettysburg on 2 July 1863.

In the course of the war, the regiment lost 4 officers and 56 enlisted men killed or mortally wounded, and a further 43 enlisted men died of disease.

== See also ==
- List of New York Civil War regiments
