= 30th United States Colored Infantry Regiment =

30th United States Colored Infantry
- Active: February 12, 1864 - December 10, 1865
- Country: United States
- Allegiance: Union
- Branch: Infantry
- Engagements: Siege of Petersburg; Battle of the Crater; Battle of Boydton Plank Road; First Battle of Fort Fisher; Second Battle of Fort Fisher; Carolinas campaign

The 30th United States Colored Infantry was an infantry regiment that served in the Union Army during the American Civil War. The regiment was composed of African American enlisted men commanded by white officers and was authorized by the Bureau of Colored Troops which was created by the United States War Department on May 22, 1863.

== Service ==
The 30th U.S. Colored Infantry was organized at Camp Stanton in Benedict, Maryland beginning February 12, 1864 for three-year service under the command of Colonel Delevan Bates.

The regiment was attached to 1st Brigade, 4th Division, IX Corps, Army of the Potomac, to September 1864. 1st Brigade, 3rd Division, IX Corps, to December 1864. 1st Brigade, 1st Division, XXV Corps, December 1864. 1st Brigade, 3rd Division, XXV Corps, to March 1865. 1st Brigade, 3rd Division, X Corps, Department of North Carolina, to July 1865. Department of North Carolina to December 1865.

The 30th U.S. Colored Infantry mustered out of service December 10, 1865.

== Detailed service ==
Campaign from the Rapidan to the James River, Va., May–June 1864. Guarded supply trains of the Army of the Potomac through the Wilderness and to Petersburg. Before Petersburg June 15–18. Siege operations against Petersburg and Richmond June 16 to December 7, 1864. Mine Explosion, Petersburg, July 30. Weldon Railroad August 18–21. Poplar Grove Church September 29-October 1. Boydton Plank Road, Hatcher's Run, October 27–28. 1st Expedition to Fort Fisher, N.C., December 7–27. 2nd Expedition to Fort Fisher, N.C., January 7–15, 1865. Bombardment of Fort Fisher January 13–15. Assault and capture of Fort Fisher January 15. Sugar Loaf Hill January 19. Federal Point February 11. Fort Anderson February 18–20. Capture of Wilmington February 22. Northeast Ferry February 22. Carolinas Campaign March 1-April 26. Advance on Kinston and Goldsboro March 6–21. Action at Cox's Bridge March 23–24. Advance on Raleigh April 9–14. Occupation of Raleigh April 14. Bennett's House April 26. Surrender of Johnston and his army. Duty at various points in North Carolina until December.

== Casualties ==
The regiment lost a total of 225 men during service; 3 officers and 48 enlisted men killed or mortally wounded, 2 officers and 177 enlisted men died of disease.

== Commanders ==
- Colonel Delevan Bates - received the Medal of Honor for action at the Battle of the Crater

== See also ==
- List of United States Colored Troops Civil War Units
- United States Colored Troops
