= 47th New York Infantry Regiment =

- Active: September 14, 1861, to August 30, 1865
- Country: United States
- Allegiance: Union
- Branch: Infantry
- Engagements: Siege of Fort Pulaski; Battle of Secessionville; Battle of Fort McAllister; Second Battle of Fort Wagner; Second Battle of Charleston Harbor; Battle of Olustee; Battle of Cold Harbor; Siege of Petersburg; Battle of the Crater; Second Battle of Deep Bottom; Battle of Chaffin's Farm; Battle of Fair Oaks & Darbytown Road; First Battle of Fort Fisher; Second Battle of Fort Fisher; Carolinas campaign; Battle of Wilmington

The 47th New York Infantry Regiment was an infantry regiment in the Union Army during the American Civil War.

== Service ==
The 47th New York Infantry was founded at New York City, New York. On 14 September 1861, the State authorities gave it its numerical designation, and it was, on the same day, mustered in the service of the United States for three years, at East New York under the command of Colonel Henry Moore. It left the state on 15 September with 678 members, for Washington, and with the 1st brigade of Sherman's division, embarked for Hilton Head in October. Upon its arrival on 3 November it was stationed at Hilton Head until 1 January 1862, when it was ordered to Beaufort, S. C., to participate in the operations against Port Royal ferry and then returned to Hilton Head. Early in February the regiment moved to Edisto island and remained there until ordered to James island in June, where it became a part of the 1st brigade, 1st division and was engaged at Secessionville. On 1 July it returned to Hilton Head, where it performed guard and picket duty during the ensuing fall and winter. It was active in the assault on Fort Wagner in July, 1863, and was stationed in that vicinity during the remainder of the year. During the Florida expedition in February 1864, the regiment suffered a loss at Olustee of 313 in killed, wounded and missing. After proceeding up the St. John's river as far as Palatka, the expedition returned to Hilton Head. In April the regiment was ordered to Virginia and assigned to the 2nd brigade, 2nd division, Army of the James, at Bermuda Hundred. On 25 May, the division was assigned to the 18th corps and after several encounters near Bermuda Hundred, notably at Port Walthall Junction, the regiment joined the Army of the Potomac just before the battle of Cold Harbor. On 15 June it took part in the first assault on Petersburg; was present at the mine explosion, on 30 July and was active in engagements at Strawberry Plains, Fort Harrison and on the Darbytown road. The original members not reenlisted were mustered out in July, 1864, but the veterans and recruits continued as a regiment in the field. In December 1864, the regiment was ordered to Fort Fisher, N. C., and played its part in the reduction of that stronghold. The 47th passed the remaining months of its service in the Carolinas, being present at Smithfield, Fort Anderson, Wilmington, Cox's bridge and Bennett's house. It was mustered out at Raleigh, N. C., on 30 August 1865, after four years of faithful and efficient service to the Union Cause. During its term of service the regiment lost 93 by death from wounds and 157 from other causes.

== Commanders ==
- Colonel Henry Moore
- Colonel James L. Fraser
- Colonel Christopher R. MacDonald

== Notable members ==
- Sergeant Richard Gasson, Company K - Medal of Honor recipient for action at the Battle of Chaffin's Farm
- Ed Pinkham, veteran and later played for the Chicago White Stockings

== See also ==
- List of New York Civil War regiments
- New York in the Civil War
