= 37th United States Colored Infantry Regiment =

37th United States Colored Infantry
- Active: February 8, 1864 - February 11, 1867
- Country: United States
- Allegiance: Union
- Branch: Infantry
- Engagements: Siege of Petersburg; Battle of Chaffin's Farm; Battle of Fair Oaks & Darbytown Road; First Battle of Fort Fisher; Second Battle of Fort Fisher; Carolinas campaign Battle of Wyse Fork

The 37th United States Colored Infantry was an infantry regiment that served in the Union Army during the American Civil War. The regiment was composed of African American enlisted men commanded by white officers and was authorized by the Bureau of Colored Troops which was created by the United States War Department on May 22, 1863.

== Service ==
The 37th U.S. Colored Infantry was organized February 8, 1864 from the 3rd North Carolina Colored Infantry for three-year service under the command of Colonel Nathan Goff, Jr.

The regiment was attached to U.S. Forces, Norfolk and Portsmouth, Virginia, Department of Virginia and North Carolina, to April 1864. 1st Brigade, Hincks' Colored Division, XVIII Corps, Army of the James, to June 1864. 1st Brigade, 3rd Division, X Corps, to July 1864. Unattached, Army of the James, to August 1864. 1st Brigade, 3rd Division, XVIII Corps, to December 1864. 3rd Brigade, 3rd Division, XXV Corps, to January, 1865. 3rd Brigade, 3rd Division, Terry's Provisional Corps, Department of North Carolina, to March 1865. 2nd Brigade, 3rd Division, X Corps, Department of North Carolina, to August 1865. Department of the South, to February 1867.

The 37th U.S. Colored Infantry mustered out of service February 11, 1867.

== Detailed service ==
Duty at Norfolk and Portsmouth, Va., until April 1864. Expedition to Westmoreland County April 12–14. Butler's operations on the south side of the James River and against Petersburg and Richmond May 4-June 15. Capture of Fort Powhatan May 5. Duty there and at Wilson's Wharf until September 28. Moved to Deep Bottom September 28–29. Battle of Chaffin's Farm, New Market Heights, September 29–30. Battle of Fair Oaks October 27–28. In the trenches before Richmond until December 7. 1st Expedition to Fort Fisher, N.C., December 7–27. 2nd Expedition to Fort Fisher January 7–15, 1865. Bombardment of Fort Fisher January 13–15. Assault and capture of Fort Fisher January 15. Sugar Loaf Hill January 19. Federal Point February 11. Fort Anderson February 18–20. Capture of Wilmington February 22. Northeast Ferry February 22. Carolinas Campaign March 1-April 26. Advance on Kinston and Goldsboro March 6–21. Cox's Bridge March 23–24. Advance on Raleigh April 9–14. Occupation of Raleigh April 14. Bennett's House April 26. Surrender of Johnston and his army. Duty at various points in North Carolina and in the Department of the South until February 1867.

== Commanders ==
- Colonel Nathan Goff, Jr.

== See also ==
- List of United States Colored Troops Civil War Units
- United States Colored Troops
