= 117th New York Infantry Regiment =

- Active: July 19, 1862 – June 8, 1865
- Country: United States
- Allegiance: Union
- Branch: Infantry
- Engagements: Siege of Suffolk; Second Battle of Charleston Harbor; Bermuda Hundred Campaign; Battle of Cold Harbor; Siege of Petersburg; Battle of the Crater; Battle of Chaffin's Farm; Battle of Fair Oaks & Darbytown Road; First Battle of Fort Fisher; Second Battle of Fort Fisher; Carolinas campaign

The 117th New York Infantry Regiment (a.k.a. "4th Oneida Regiment") was an infantry regiment in the Union Army during the American Civil War.

Its commanders were Colonel William Russell Pease, Colonel Alvin White, and Colonel Rufus Daggett. Charles Wheelock served with it.

== Service ==
The 117th New York Infantry was organized in Rome, New York beginning July 19, 1862 and mustered in August 8, 1862 for three-years service under the command of Colonel William Russell Pease.

The regiment was attached to Defenses of Washington north of the Potomac River, to October 1862. 2nd and 3rd Brigade, Haskins' Division, north of the Potomac River, to March 1863. 2nd and 3rd Brigades, Haskins' Division, north of the Potomac River, XXII Corps, to April 1863. 1st Brigade, 2nd Division, VII Corps, Department of Virginia, to July 1863. Alvord's Brigade, Vodge's Division, Folly Island, South Carolina, X Corps, Department of the South, to February 1864. 2nd Brigade, Folly Island, Northern District, Department of the South, to April 1864. 1st Brigade, 2nd Division, X Corps, Army of the James, Department of Virginia and North Carolina, to May 1864. 3rd Brigade, 3rd Division, XVIII Corps, to June 1864. 1st Brigade, 2nd Division, X Corps, to December 1864. 1st Brigade, 2nd Division, XXIV Corps, to January 1865. 1st Brigade, 2nd Division, Terry's Provisional Corps, Department of North Carolina, to March 1865. 1st Brigade, 2nd Division, X Corps, Army of the Ohio, Department of North Carolina, to June 1865.

The 117th New York Infantry mustered out June 8, 1865 at Raleigh, North Carolina and was discharged June 26, 1865 at Buffalo, New York. Recruits and veterans were transferred to the 48th New York Infantry.

== Detailed service ==
Left New York for Washington, D.C., August 22, 1862. Duty in the defenses of Washington, D.C., and at Tennallytown until April 1863. Ordered to Suffolk, Va., April 16. Siege of Suffolk, April 20 – May 4. Providence Church Road, Nansemond River, May 3. Dix's Peninsula Campaign, June 24 – July 7. Expedition from White House to South Anna River, July 1–7. Ordered to Folly Island, South Carolina, July 12. Siege operations against Forts Wagner and Gregg, Morris Island, South Carolina, and against Charleston and Fort Sumter August 17 – September 7. Bombardment of Fort Sumter and Charleston August 17–23. Operations against Charleston, South Carolina, and duty on Folly Island, South Carolina, until April 1864. Moved to Gloucester Point, Virginia, April. Butler's operations on south side of the James River and against Petersburg and Richmond, May 4–28. Occupation of City Point and Bermuda Hundred May 5. Swift Creek or Arrowfield Church May 9–10. Operations against Fort Darling, May 12–16. Battle of Drury's Bluff, May 14–16. Bermuda Hundred, May 16–28. Moved to White House, then to Cold Harbor, May 28–31. Battles about Cold Harbor, June 1–12. Before Petersburg, June 15–18. Siege operations against Petersburg and Richmond, June 16 to December 7, 1864. Duty in the trenches before Petersburg and on the Bermuda Hundred front until September 27. Battle of Chaffin's Farm, New Market Heights, September 28–30. Battle of Fair Oaks, October 27–28. Duty in the trenches before Richmond until December 7. Expedition to Fort Fisher, North Carolina, December 7–27. 2nd Expedition to Fort Fisher, North Carolina, January 3–15. Assault and capture of Fort Fisher, January 15. Cape Fear Entrenchment's, February 11–13. Sugar Loaf Battery, February 11. Fort Anderson, February 18–19. Capture of Wilmington, February 22. Carolinas Campaign, March 1 – April 26. Advance on Goldsboro, March 6–21. Occupation of Raleigh, April 14. Bennett's House, April 26. Surrender of Johnston and his army. Duty in North Carolina until June.

== Casualties ==
The regiment lost a total of 266 men during service; 7 officers and 123 enlisted men killed or mortally wounded, one officer and 135 enlisted men died of disease.

== Commanders ==
- Colonel William Russell Pease
- Colonel Alvin White
- Colonel Rufus Daggett

== See also ==
- List of New York Civil War regiments
- New York in the Civil War
