= 39th United States Colored Infantry Regiment =

39th United States Colored Infantry
- Active: March 22, 1864 - December 4, 1865
- Country: United States
- Allegiance: Union
- Branch: Infantry
- Engagements: Siege of Petersburg; Battle of the Crater; Battle of Globe Tavern; Battle of Peebles' Farm; Battle of Boydton Plank Road; First Battle of Fort Fisher; Second Battle of Fort Fisher; Carolinas campaign

The 39th United States Colored Infantry was an infantry regiment that served in the Union Army during the American Civil War. The regiment was composed of African American enlisted men commanded by white officers and was authorized by the Bureau of Colored Troops which was created by the United States War Department on May 22, 1863.

== Service ==
The 39th U.S. Colored Infantry was organized in Baltimore, Maryland beginning March 22, 1864 for three-year service under the command of Colonel Ozora P. Stearns.

The regiment was attached to 1st Brigade, 4th Division, IX Corps, Army of the Potomac, to September 1864. 1st Brigade, 3rd Division, IX Corps, to December 1864. 2nd Brigade, 1st Division, XXV Corps, to December 1864. 2nd Brigade, 3rd Division, XXV Corps, January 1865. 2nd Brigade, 3rd Division, Terry's Provisional Corps, Department of North Carolina, to March 1865. 2nd Brigade, 3rd Division, X Corps, Department of North Carolina, to August 1865. Department of North Carolina to December 1865.

The 39th U.S. Colored Infantry mustered out of service December 4, 1865.

== Detailed service ==
Campaign from the Rapidan River to the James River, Va., May–June 1864. Guarded supply trains of the Army of the Potomac through the Wilderness and to Petersburg. Before Petersburg June 15–19. Siege of Petersburg and Richmond June 16-December 7. Mine Explosion, Petersburg, July 30. Weldon Railroad August 18–21. Poplar Grove Church September 29–30 and October 1. Boydton Plank Road, Hatcher's Run, October 27–28. On the Bermuda Hundred front until December. 1st Expedition to Fort Fisher, N.C., December 7–27. 2nd Expedition to Fort Fisher, N.C., January 7–15, 1865. Bombardment of Fort Fisher January 13–15. Assault and capture of Fort Fisher January 15. Sugar Loaf Hill January 19. Federal Point February 11. Fort Anderson February 18–20. Capture of Wilmington February 22. Northeast Ferry February 22. Carolinas Campaign March 1-April 26. Advance on Kinston and Goldsboro March 6–21. Cox's Bridge March 23–24. Advance on Raleigh April 9–14. Occupation of Raleigh April 14. Bennett's House April 26. Surrender of Johnston and his army. Duty at various points in the Department of North Carolina until December.

== Casualties ==
The regiment lost a total of 280 men during service; 38 enlisted men killed or mortally wounded, 3 officers and 239 enlisted men died of disease.

== Commanders ==
- Colonel Ozora P. Stearns

== Notable members ==
- Corporal Decatur Dorsey, Company B - Medal of Honor recipient for action at the Battle of the Crater

== See also ==
- List of United States Colored Troops Civil War Units
- United States Colored Troops
