= Elias Wright =

Elias Wright (June 22, 1830 – January 2, 1901) was a Union Army officer during the American Civil War.

Elias Wright was born at Durham, New York on June 22, 1830. He was a surveyor and civil engineer before the Civil War.

Wright's service started as a second lieutenant in the 4th New Jersey Volunteer Infantry Regiment on August 19, 1861. He was promoted to first lieutenant on January 31, 1862. He was captured at the Battle of Gaines's Mill on June 27, 1862 and exchanged. He was promoted to captain on December 29, 1862.

Wright was appointed major of the 1st United States Colored Infantry, June 25, 1863, and lieutenant colonel, April 29, 1864. He was appointed colonel of the 10th United States Colored Infantry on August 15, 1864. He was in brigade command of Brigade 2, Division 3, XVIII Corps (Union Army), Army of the James, August 15, 1864, to August 22, 1864, and October 29, 1864, to November 6, 1864. He was in command of Brigade 1, Division 3, XVIII Corp, Army of the James, November 26, 1864 to December 3, 1864, Brigade 3, Division 1, XXV Corps (Union Army), Army of the James, December 3, 1864 to December 31, 1864, and Brigade 3, Division 3, XXV Corps, Army of the James from December 31, 1864 to January 6, 1865. He was in command of Brigade 3, Division 3, X Corps (Union Army) (Terry's Provisional Corps), Department of North Carolina, January 6, 1865 to February 20, 1865.

On February 15, 1865, President Abraham Lincoln nominated Wright for appointment to the grade of brevet brigadier general, to rank from January 15, 1865, and the United States Senate confirmed the appointment on March 3, 1865.

Wright resigned his commission on June 17, 1865. After the war, he was a civil engineer and land agent at Atlantic City, New Jersey. Elias Wright died at Atlantic City on January 2, 1901.

== See also ==
- List of American Civil War brevet generals (Union)
