= First Battle of Fort Fisher =

Battle of the American Civil War

Coordinates: 33.9715°N 77.9180°W

- Part of the American Civil War
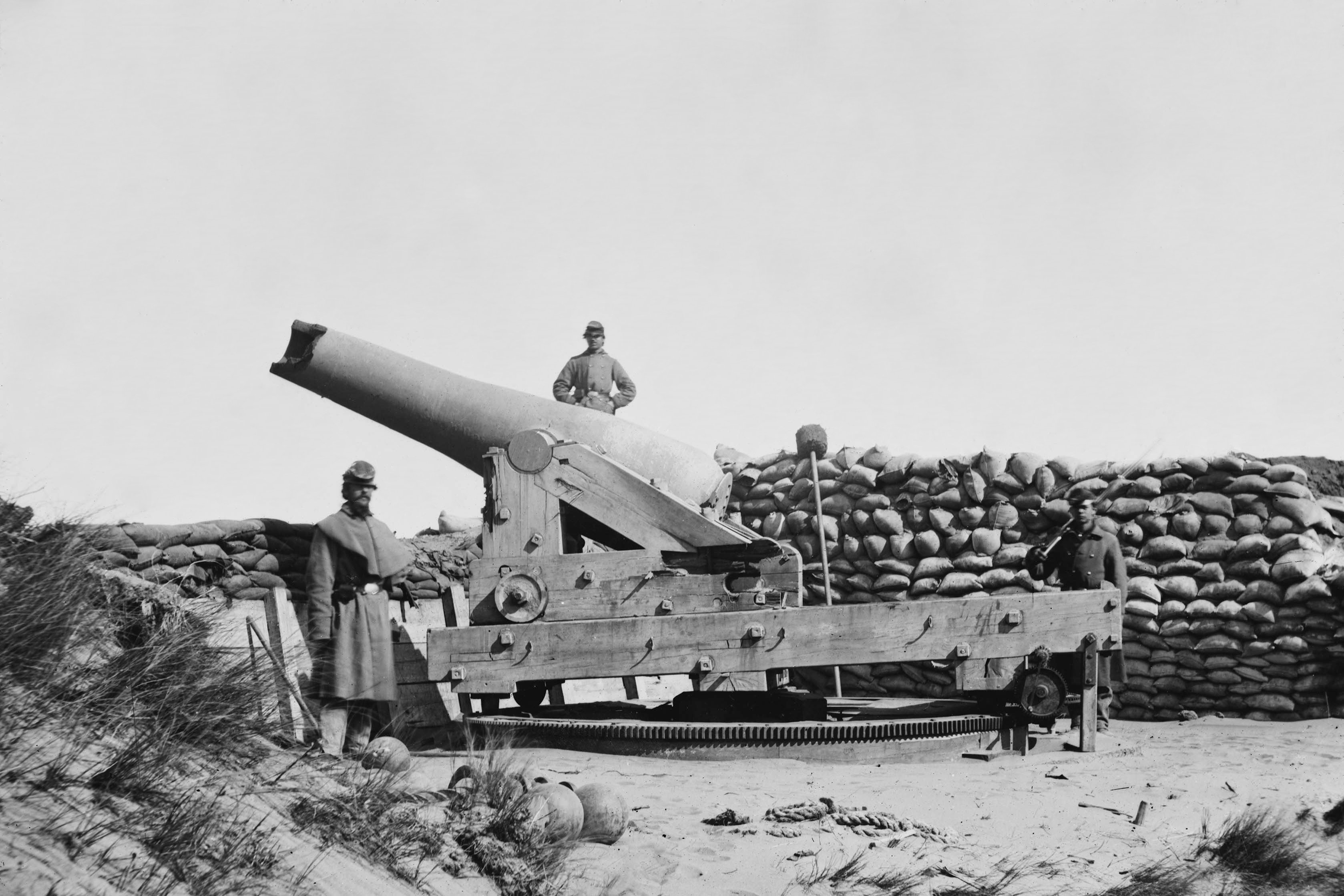
- A damaged Confederate gun at Fort Fisher
Date	December 24–27, 1864
Location	New Hanover County, North Carolina
Result	Confederate victory

Belligerents
United States	Confederate States

Commanders and leaders
Benjamin Butler (United States Navy) David D. Porter	William H.C. Whiting; William Lamb

Units involved
Expeditionary Corps, Army of the James; North Atlantic Blockading Squadron; U.S. Marines	Hoke's Division; Fort Fisher Garrison

Casualties and losses
- 320

The First Battle of Fort Fisher was a naval siege in the American Civil War, when the Union tried to capture the fort guarding Wilmington, North Carolina, the South's last major Atlantic port. Led by Major General Benjamin Butler, it lasted from December 24–27, 1864.

The Union navy first attempted to detonate a ship filled with powder in order to demolish the fort's walls but this failed; the navy then launched a two-day bombardment in order to demolish the fort and compel surrender. On the second day, the Union army started landing troops in order to begin the siege. But Butler got news of enemy reinforcements approaching, and in the worsening weather conditions, he aborted the operation, declaring the fort to be impregnable. To his embarrassment, Butler was relieved of command on January 8, 1865, and was replaced by Major General Alfred H. Terry, who led a follow-up expedition that captured the fort one week later.

== Background ==
After the failed Bermuda Hundred Campaign, Major General Benjamin Butler and his Army of the James were assigned to an amphibious expedition against Fort Fisher. Lieutenant General Ulysses S. Grant had originally designated one of Butler's subordinates, Major General Godfrey Weitzel, to lead the expedition, but Butler, as the commander of the Department of Virginia and North Carolina, demanded that he lead the troops himself and Grant acquiesced. Units for the expedition were selected from the Army of the James and included the 2nd Division of the XXIV Corps and the 3rd Division from the XXV Corps, along with two battalions of heavy artillery and engineers. Colonel Cyrus B. Comstock from Grant's staff went along to serve as chief engineer. The Union naval expedition under Rear Admiral David D. Porter comprised the largest Union fleet of the war, nearly 60 warships along with the transports to carry the army troops.

Butler also planned to bring the USS Louisiana, which had been packed with 200 tons of powder and disguised as a blockade runner, down to Fort Fisher, run it aground about a hundred yards from the fort's seawall, and blow it up, hoping the explosion would demolish the fort as well. Although many in the Union high command (including Grant and Gideon Welles) doubted the plan would work, it was approved by Lincoln. The final Union plan was for the ships to gather at Hampton Roads, where the army troops would board the transports. Because the monitors used in the attack had to be towed to Fort Fisher, the navy would leave with a twelve-hour head start over the transports. The warships would refuel at Beaufort, then meet the transports at Fort Fisher, when the Louisiana would be detonated and the troops landed under the fire of the warships.

Fort Fisher, on Confederate Point, nicknamed the "Gibraltar of the Confederacy", was a formidable target commanding the Cape Fear River. It encompassed 14,500 ft.² and was surrounded by a 10-foot parapet and a network of bombproofs, most of which were 30 feet high. Many obstructions were laid around it, including land mines (called torpedoes in this era), abatis, and deep ditches. There were more than 50 heavy cannon, including 15 Columbiads and a 150-pounder Armstrong gun, behind a 60-foot mound of earth near the sea, named the Mound Battery. The fort's garrison of 1,400 men was commanded by Colonel William Lamb. Additional reinforcements were available from General Braxton Bragg at Sugar Loaf, 4 miles away. This force consisted of Major General Robert F. Hoke's division from the Army of Northern Virginia, which arrived on December 23.

== Opposing forces ==
=== United States of America ===
==== United States Army ====
Expeditionary Corps (Army of the James) – MG. Benjamin F. Butler, MG Godfrey Weitzel (second-in-command)

- 2nd Division (XXIV Corps) – BG. Adelbert Ames
  - 1st Brigade - Brevet BG. Newton M. Curtis
    - 3rd New York – Cpt. George W. Warren
    - 112th New York – Ltc. John W. Smith
    - 117th New York – Col. Rufus Daggett
    - 142nd New York - Ltc. Albert M. Barney
  - 2nd Brigade - Col. Galusha Pennypacker
    - 47th New York – Cpt. Joseph P. McDonald
    - 48th New York – Ltc. William B. Coan
    - 76th Pennsylvania – Col. John S. Littell
    - 97th Pennsylvania – Lt. John Wainwright
    - 203rd Pennsylvania - Col. John W. Moore
  - 3rd Brigade - Col. Louis Bell
    - 13th Indiana – Cpt. Samuel M. Zent
    - 4th New Hampshire – Cpt. John H. Roberts
    - 115th New York – Maj Ezra L. Walrath
    - 169th New York – Col. Alonzo Alden
  - Artillery
    - 16th Independent Battery New York Light Artillery - Cpt. Richard H. Lee
  - Naval Brigade - BG Charles K. Graham
- 3rd Division (XXV Corps) – BG. Charles J. Paine
  - 2nd Brigade - Col. John W. Ames
    - 4th USCT – Ltc. George Rogers
    - 6th USCT – Ltc. Clark Royce
    - 30th USCT – Ltc. Hiram A. Oakman
    - 39th USCT – Col. Ozora P. Stearns
  - 3rd Brigade - Col. Elias Wright
    - 1st USCT - Ltc. Giles H. Rich
    - 5th USCT – Col. Giles W. Shurtleff
    - 10th USCT - Ltc. Edward H. Powell
    - 37th USCT – Col. Nathan Goff Jr.
    - 107th USCT - Ltc. David M. Sells
  - Artillery
    - Battery E, 3rd U.S. Artillery – Lt. John Myrick

==== United States Navy ====
North Atlantic Blockading Squadron – Rear Admiral David D. Porter:

- Line Number 1
  - USS Canonicus – Lcdr. George Belknap
  - USS Huron – Lcdr. Thomas O. Selfridge Jr.
  - USS Kansas – Lcdr. Pendleton G. Watmough
  - USS Mahopac – Lcdr. Edward Potter
  - USS Monadnock – Cmdr. Enoch G. Parrott
  - USS New Ironsides – Cmdr. William Radford
  - USS Nyack – Lcdr. L. Howard Newman
  - USS Pequot – Lcdr. Daniel L. Braine
  - USS Pontoosuc – Lcdr. William G. Temple
  - USS Saugus – Cmdr. Edmund R. Colhoun
  - USS Unadilla – Lcdr. Frank M. Ramsay
- Line Number 2
  - USS Bignonia – Lt. Warrington D. Roath
  - USS Brooklyn – Cpt. James Alden
  - USS Colorado – Cdre. Henry K. Thatcher
  - USS Juniata – Cpt. William Rogers Taylor
  - USS Mackinaw – Cmdr. John C. Beaumont
  - USS Maumee – Lcdr. Ralph Chandler
  - USS Minnesota – Cdre. Joseph Lanman
  - USS Mohican – Cmdr. Daniel Ammen
  - USS Pawtuxet – Cmdr. James H. Spotts
  - USS Powhatan – Cdre. James F. Schenck
  - USS Seneca – Lcdr. Montgomery Sicard
  - USS Shenandoah – Cpt. Daniel B. Ridgley
  - USS Susquehanna – Cdre. Sylvanus William Godon
  - USS Ticonderoga – Cpt. Charles Steedman
  - USS Tuscarora – Cmdr. James M. Frailey
  - USS Vanderbilt – Cpt. Charles W. Pickering
  - USS Wabash – Cpt. Melancton Smith
  - USS Yantic – Lcdr. Thomas C. Harris
- Line Number 3
  - USS Chippewa – Lcdr. Aaron Weaver
  - USS Fort Jackson – Cpt. Benjamin F. Sands
  - USS Iosco – Cmdr. John Guest
  - USS Monticello – Lt. Daniel A. Campbell
  - USS Osceola – Cmdr. John M.B. Clitz
  - USS Quaker City – Cmdr. William F. Spicer
  - USS Rhode Island – Cmdr. Stephen D. Trenchard
  - USS Santiago de Cuba – Cpt. Oliver S. Glisson
  - USS Sassacus – Lcdr. John L. Davis
  - USS Tacony – Lcdr. William T. Truxton
- Reserve Line
  - USS Advance – Lcdr. John H. Upshur
  - USS Alabama – Lt. Frank Smith
  - USS Aries – Lt. Francis S. Wells
  - USS Anemone – Ens. William C. Borden
  - USS Banshee – Lt. Walter H. Garfield
  - USS Britannia – Lt. Samuel Huse
  - USS Cherokee – Lt. William E. Dennison
  - USS Emma – Lt. Thomas C. Dunn
  - USS Eolus
  - USS Gettysburg – Lt. Roswell Lamson
  - USS Governor Buckingham – Lt. John MacDiarmid
  - USS Lilian – Lt. T.A. Harris
  - USS Little Ada
  - USS Malvern – Lcdr. Benjamin H. Porter
  - USS Maratanza – Lcdr. George Young
  - USS Moccasin – Ens. James Brown
  - USS Montgomery – Lt. Edward H. Faucon
  - USS Nansemond
  - USS R. R. Cuyler – Cmdr. Charles Henry Bromedge Caldwell
  - USS Tristram Shandy – Lt. Edward F. Devens
  - USS Wilderness

=== Confederate States of America ===
- District of Cape Fear – MG. William H.C. Whiting
  - Fort Fisher Garrison - Col. William Lamb
    - 10th North Carolina - Ltc. John P.W. Read (w), Maj. James Reilly
    - 36th North Carolina - Col. William Lamb
    - 40th North Carolina
    - 1st Battalion North Carolina Junior Reserves - Maj. D.T. Millard
    - 1st Battalion North Carolina Heavy Artillery, Co. D - Cpt. James L. McCormic
    - 3rd Battalion North Carolina Light Artillery, Co. C - Cpt. John M. Sutton
    - 13th Battalion North Carolina Light Artillery, Co. D - Cpt. Zachariah T. Adams
    - Confederate Navy Detachment – Lt. Robert T. Chapman
    - Confederate Marine Corps Detachment – Cpt. A.C. Van Benthuysen
- Hoke's Division (Army of Northern Virginia) – MG. Robert F. Hoke
  - Hagood's Brigade - BG. Johnson Hagood
    - 7th South Carolina Battalion - Ltc. James H. Rion
    - 11th South Carolina - Col. F. Hay Gantt
    - 21st South Carolina - Col. Robert F. Graham
    - 25th South Carolina - Cpt. James Carson
    - 27th South Carolina
  - Kirkland's Brigade - BG. William Kirkland
    - 17th North Carolina - Ltc. Thomas H. Sharp
    - 42nd North Carolina - Col. John E. Brown
    - 66th North Carolina - Col. John H. Nethercutt
  - Connally's Brigade, North Carolina Reserves – Col. John K. Connally
    - 4th Battalion North Carolina Junior Reserves - Maj. John M. Reece
    - 7th Battalion North Carolina Junior Reserves - Maj. William F. French
    - 8th Battalion North Carolina Junior Reserves - Maj. James Ellington
    - 8th Battalion North Carolina Senior Reserves - Col. Allmond McKoy
  - Artillery
    - Southerland's Battery - Cpt. Thomas J. Southerland
    - Paris's Battery, Staunton Hill Artillery - Cpt. Andrew B. Paris

== Battle ==
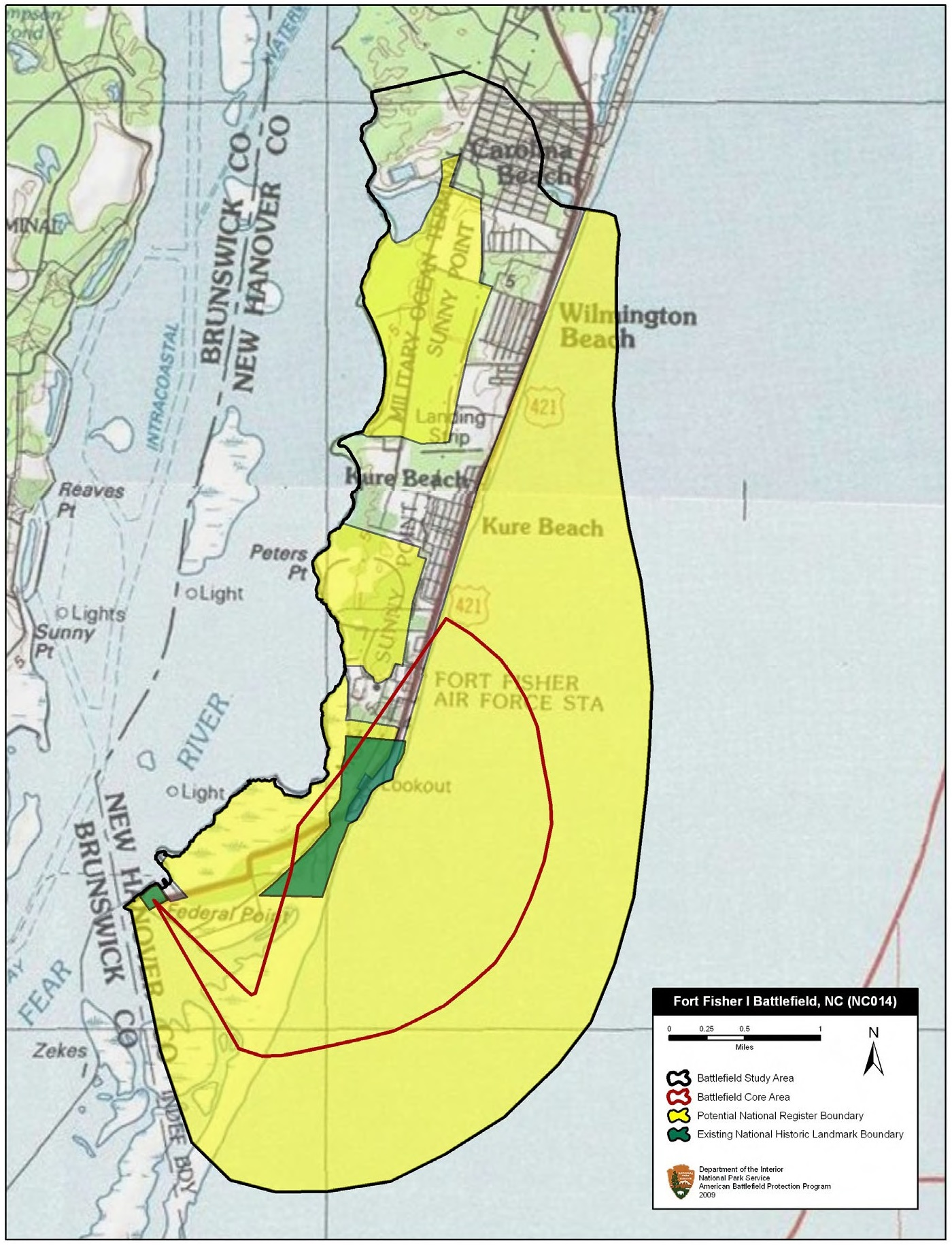
Map of Fort Fisher I Battlefield core and study areas by the American Battlefield Protection Program

United States forces prepared to leave Hampton Roads on December 10, but a winter storm hit the fleet for three days, preventing the fleet's departure until the 14th. The transports carrying Butler's force arrived at Fort Fisher first, since the United States Navy took longer to refuel at Beaufort than expected. When Porter's ships arrived on the 19th, another storm hit the fleet, causing some ships to scatter and forcing the Army transports to return to Beaufort. After the storm subsided on the 23rd, Porter decided to start the attack without Butler, ordering the Louisiana to be blown up that night. Near midnight, the ship was towed close to the fort's seawall and set on fire. However, the Louisiana was farther out to sea than US Navy commanders thought, perhaps as far as a mile offshore; as a result, Fort Fisher was undamaged by the blast.

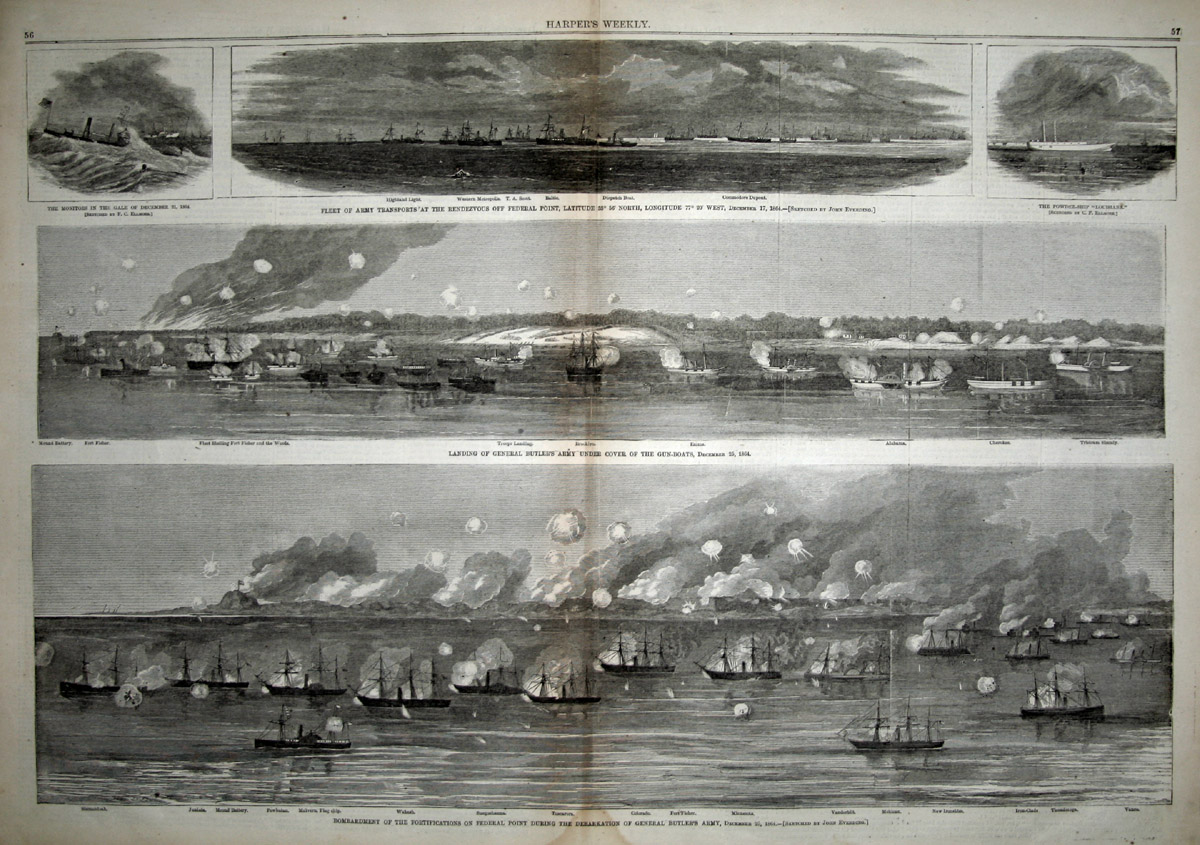
The bombardment of Federal Point, Harper's Weekly, 1865

The following morning (December 23), US Navy forces moved closer to shore and began a bombardment of the fort, hoping to damage the earthworks and forcing the garrison to surrender. Despite firing close to 10,000 shells that day, only minor damage was caused, with four seacoast gun carriages disabled, one light artillery caisson destroyed, and 23 casualties in the garrison. Meanwhile, there were 45 United States casualties from exploding guns aboard ships, and Confederate Army artillery was able to score direct hits on three ships.

The transports carrying the United States soldiers arrived that evening. Initially, Butler thought that by exploding the Louisiana and starting the bombardment without the US Army forces, Porter had given the Confederate Army warning that the United States assault was coming and would therefore have time to contest the landings. However he was convinced to land a reconnaissance party to determine if an attack was still feasible. The landings started Christmas morning, with Brig. Gen. Adelbert Ames' division the first to be ashore, while the US Navy ships continued bombarding the fort. The United States Army re-captured a battery protecting the beach north of Fort Fisher, and accepted the surrender of the 4th and 8th North Carolina Army Junior Reserve battalions, which had been cut off by the United States landings. After setting up a defensive line, Ames sent the brigade of N. Martin Curtis towards the fort to see if it could be attacked. Curtis found the land wall lightly defended and was prepared to attack, but was prevented from doing so by Ames. Butler was convinced that the fort was undamaged and too strong for an assault; he had also received word that Hoke's division was a few miles north of the fort, and another storm was forming in the area. All this convinced him to halt the landings and order the US Navy sailors on the beach to return to the ships; the United States fleet then returned to Hampton Roads.

== Aftermath ==
The fiasco at Fort Fisher, specifically Butler's disobeyance of his direct orders—orders which Butler failed to communicate either to Porter or to Weitzel—gave Grant an excuse to relieve Butler, replacing him in command of the US Army of the James by Major General Edward Ord. President Abraham Lincoln, recently reelected, no longer needed to keep the prominent Democrat in the US Army and he was relieved on January 8, 1865. US Army forces re-captured Fort Fisher one week later when Major General Alfred H. Terry led a second assault against the Confederate Army-held stronghold; while defending his decision to break off the attack before the Joint Committee on the Conduct of the War, Butler had deemed the fort impregnable.

Confederate States Army losses were five killed and mortally wounded, fifty-six wounded, and six hundred captured, while the damage caused by the bombardment was quickly repaired. Confederate States blockade runners continued using the port. The next ships to arrive did so the night US Navy fleet withdrew. Although Whiting and Lamb were convinced that the US Navy would shortly return, Bragg withdrew Hoke's Division back to Wilmington and started making plans to once again capture New Bern.

== See also ==
- Second Battle of Fort Fisher
- Wilmington, North Carolina, in the Civil War
- Bibliography of early American naval history
