= USS Maumee (1863) =

Gunboat of the United States Navy

History

United States
- Laid down: date unknown
- Launched: 2 July 1863
- Commissioned: 29 September 1864
- Decommissioned: 17 June 1865
- Stricken: 1865 (est.)
- Fate: Sold, 15 December 1869

General characteristics
- Displacement: 593 tons
- Length: 190 ft (58 m)
- Beam: 29 ft (8.8 m)
- Draft: 11 ft 3 in (3.43 m)
- Propulsion: steam engine; screw-propelled
- Speed: 11.5 knots
- Complement: 96
- Armament: one 100-pounder Parrott rifle; one 30-pounder Parrott rifle; four 24-pounder guns; one 12-pounder rifle

USS Maumee was a steamer purchased by the Union Navy during the American Civil War. With her heavy guns, she was planned by the Union Navy for use as a bombardment gunboat, but also as a gunboat stationed off Confederate waterways to prevent their trading with foreign countries.

Maumee was launched by the New York Navy Yard 2 July 1863; and commissioned 29 September 1864. Lt. Comdr. Ralph Chandler in command.

== Assigned to the North Atlantic Blockade ==
The new gunboat sailed for Hampton Roads, Virginia, 2 October and joined the North Atlantic Blockading Squadron there on the 8th. She got underway on the 26th, seeking Confederate cruiser CSS Tallahassee then preying on northern merchantmen near Boston, Massachusetts. After steaming as far north as Halifax, Nova Scotia, she returned to New York City, 8 November, en route back to Hampton Roads, Virginia, to prepare for an attack on Fort Fisher which protected Wilmington, North Carolina.

== The attack on Fort Fisher, North Carolina ==
The first assault made on Christmas Eve was unsuccessful, but the Union ships returned 13 January 1865 and shelled the southern stronghold while troops were landed. They supported the Union ground forces during a 2-day campaign which carried the Confederate works on the 15th, closing the vital southern port.

== Virginia operations ==
On 15 February Maumee was ordered up Cape Fear River to support Union Army operations, and 10 days later she was assigned to the James River for similar action. In March, when the Confederate capitol of Richmond, Virginia, fell, Maumee was one of the vessels assigned occupation duty along the waterfront.

== Post-war decommissioning and sale ==
After the war, Maumee sailed to Philadelphia, Pennsylvania, where she decommissioned 17 June 1865 and was sold to a Mr. Landstein of Hong Kong 15 December 1869.
