= Wilmington campaigns =

- Part of the American Civil War
- Fort Fisher and Wilmington on the Cape Fear River were the two obstacles to the Union advance into North Carolina.
Date	December 7, 1864 – February 22, 1865
Location	Eastern North Carolina
Result	Union victory

Belligerents
United States (Union)	(Confederate States of America) CSA (Confederacy)

Commanders and leaders
Alfred Terry; David D. Porter; Benjamin Butler; John Schofield	Braxton Bragg; William Lamb; William H.C. Whiting †; Alfred H. Colquitt

Strength
100,000	95,000

Casualties and losses
1, 971	1,748

The Wilmington campaigns were part of a Union effort to take Wilmington, North Carolina, from the Confederates. Wilmington was the last major port on the Atlantic seacoast available to the Confederacy. Fort Fisher guarded the Cape Fear River and in order to capture Wilmington, Fort Fisher had to fall.

== First campaign ==
On 7 December 1864, Union troops under command of General Benjamin Butler were sent to take the fort. Before the troops arrived, Admiral David D. Porter sent USS Wyalusing and two escort ships on an expedition to try to capture Rainbow Bluff and a Confederate ram. But Porter didn't know that there were Water mines in the river. Both of the escorts were sunk by the mines and the expedition was abandoned.

Colonel William Lamb was charged with defending Fort Fisher. The Union troops numbered about 6,500 men, and the Confederates had about 7,000. Due to a number of delays caused by storms, the attack didn't begin until 23 December. In the interim, General Braxton Bragg reinforced the Fort Fisher garrison.

The Navy began bombarding the fort and the Union troops started landing on Christmas morning, with Brig. Gen. Adelbert Ames' division the first ashore, and soon capturing a Confederate battery and two reserve battalions. After setting up a defensive line, Ames ordered N. Martin Curtis' brigade to reconnoiter the fort to see if it could be attacked. Curtis found the land wall lightly defended and was prepared to attack, but was prevented from doing so by Ames. By then, believing the fort to be too strong to assault, and with another storm forming in the area, Butler decided to halt the landings. He called off the campaign on 27 December, ignoring General Grant's orders to besiege the fort if an attack failed. The Union troops retreated back to their ships and returned to Hampton Roads and Fort Monroe.

== Second campaign ==
When the December expedition against Fort Fisher failed, Maj. Gen. Benjamin Butler was relieved of command. Maj. Gen. Alfred Terry was placed in command to make another attempt to take Fort Fisher several weeks later. General Terry selected Porter to land the troops. Union Marines landed, and fought their way up the beach. Soldiers engaged at point-blank range, and the beach was taken and the right side of the fort fell into Union hands. Then, after horrendous melee combat on the left side, the Confederates retreated to Fort Buchanan. That fort surrendered too and the way up the Cape Fear River was clear.

Then, General John Schofield was given the responsibility of making the attempt to take Wilmington. General Bragg prepared 6,000 men in the city. General Schofield had 12,000 men. The Union and the Confederates battled from February 11 until February 22. Bragg was forced to surrender Wilmington to the Union troops.
