= William Lamb (Confederate States Army officer) =

Confederate Army officer (1835–1909)

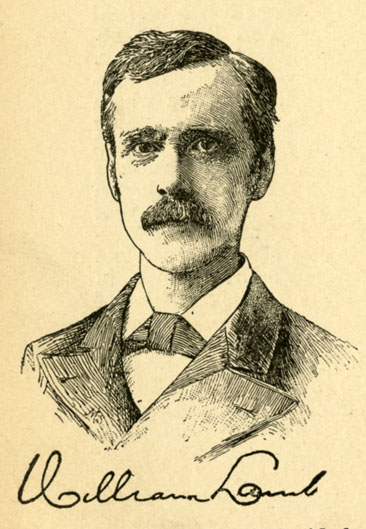

Mayor of Norfolk, Virginia
- In office 1880–1886
- Preceded by: John S. Tucker
- Succeeded by: Barton Myers

Personal details
- Born: September 7, 1835 Norfolk, Virginia, U.S.
- Died: March 23, 1909 (aged 73) Norfolk, Virginia, U.S.
- Party: Democratic (until 1882); Republican (from 1882)

Military service
- Allegiance: Confederate States
- Branch/service: Confederate States Army
- Years of service: 1861–1865
- Rank: Colonel
- Battles/wars: American Civil War

William Lamb (September 7, 1835 – March 23, 1909) was an American newspaper editor, politician, businessman, and soldier, noted for his role as a Confederate States Army officer in commanding the Confederate garrison at Fort Fisher at the mouth of the Cape Fear River during the Civil War.

== Early years ==
William Lamb was born in Norfolk, Virginia to William Wilson and Margaret Kerr Lamb. He studied in the Rappahannock Military Academy before attending the College of William & Mary at Williamsburg, Virginia, where he received a degree in law.

After his 1855 return to the family home, Kenmure in Norfolk, Lamb became the co-owner and co-editor with A. F. Leonard of the Southern Argus, a Norfolk newspaper. He entered local politics and was elected a delegate to the Democratic National Convention; in 1860 he was a Presidential elector on the Democratic ticket of John C. Breckinridge and Joseph Lane.

== Civil War ==
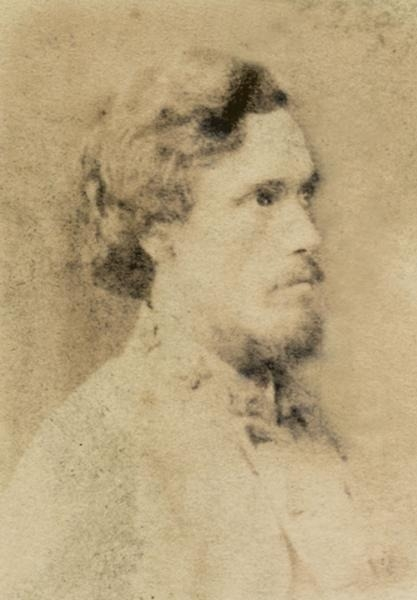
Col. William Lamb

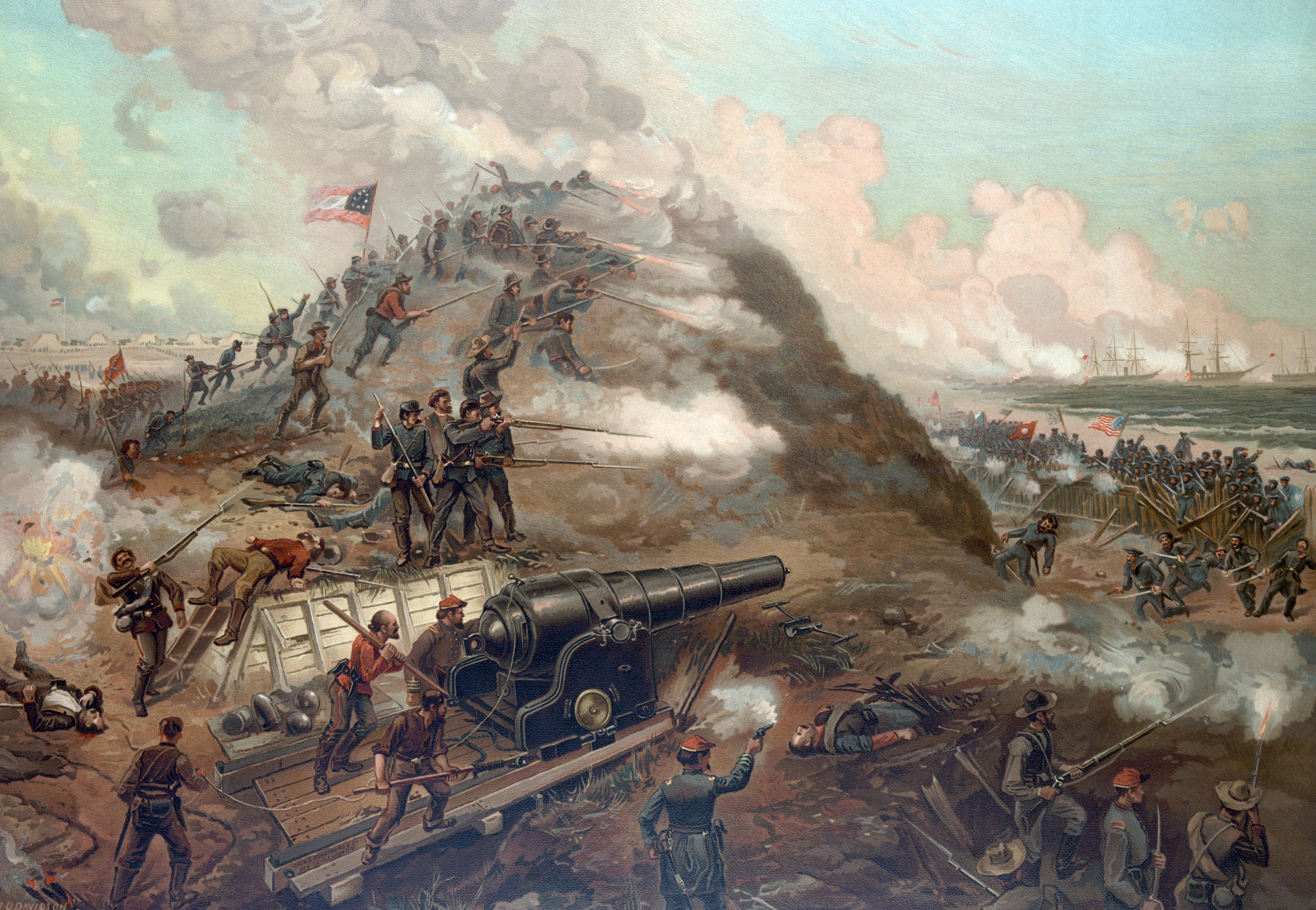
Siege of Fort Fisher by Julian O. Davidson.

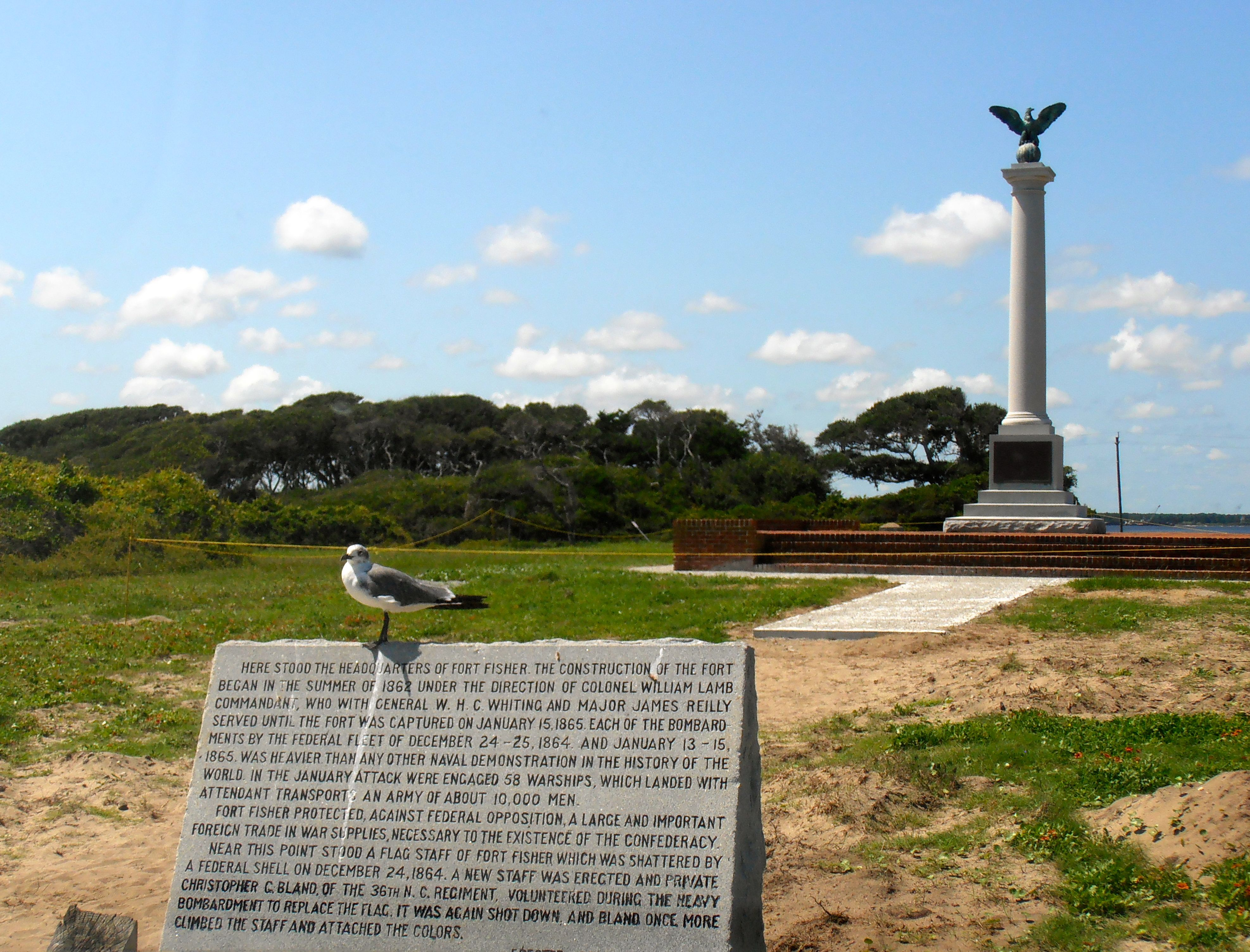
The monument at the spot of Col. Lamb's headquarters at Fort Fisher

Lamb was active in the state militia and commanded the Woodis Rifles, a militia company raised in Norfolk, Virginia in 1858 and named after Hunter Woodis, the city mayor. It was sent in 1859 to Harpers Ferry during John Brown's raid on Harpers Ferry.

On September 24, 1861, he was commissioned major and appointed quartermaster on the staff of Brigadier General Joseph R. Anderson. He initially oversaw Fort St. Philip located 15 miles south of Wilmington, North Carolina, which was on July 1, 1863, renamed Fort Anderson. In 1862, Lamb was elected as the colonel of the 36th North Carolina Regiment.

On July 4, 1862, Colonel Lamb assumed command of Fort Fisher. Located on the narrow Federal Point peninsula, it protected the New Inlet, which led into the Cape Fear River and thus was critical for the operation of the Port of Wilmington. When he arrived, he observed in his words "... a small work, part of it constructed of perishable sand bags and its longest face was about one hundred yards. Out of its half dozen large guns, only the two eight-inch Columbiads were suitable for seacoast defense. One of the Federal frigates could have cleaned it out with a few broad-sides.”

Although not trained as an engineer, he was interested in military fortifications and studied their role in the Crimean War, especially, the Russian fortress of Malakoff at Sevastopol. Lamb spent two-and-a-half years working relentlessly to construct the Confederacy's largest bastion at a length of seven hundred yards that became known as the South’s Gibraltar.

Recognizing Fort Fisher's strategic value to the Confederacy, he successfully defended the fort against a Union attack led by Benjamin Butler and David Dixon Porter on December 24–26, 1864. Two weeks later, in January 1865, Alfred Terry, who replaced Butler, and Admiral Porter led a renewed attack against the fort. They were able to assemble a prevailing force of 8,000 aided by over 600 guns on ships against fewer than 2,000 defenders of the fort. Despite fierce fighting by Lamb and his garrison for two days, the fort was captured. The Confederate losses stood at about 500 men; the Union toll was near three times more.

Lamb was grievously wounded and taken prisoner. He was sent to U.S. Army's Chesapeake Hospital at Fort Monroe, Virginia. There, he met with Union Col. Newton Martin Curtis, who himself was badly wounded and lost an eye during the Second Battle of Fort Fisher. They developed a friendship and later worked together on calming tensions between the North and South.

== Later years ==
Lamb eventually recovered, becoming from 1880 to 1886 the mayor of Norfolk, Virginia as his father and grandfather had been before him. Initially a member of the Democratic Party, he joined the Republican Party in 1882. He was the chair of the state Republican Party from 1895 to 1897. In 1900, he was made a Knight of the Order of Vasa, for his services as consul for Sweden and Norway. He died in Norfolk on March 23, 1909, and is buried there in Elmwood Cemetery. His personal papers are held by the Special Collections Research Center at the College of William & Mary.

His family home at Norfolk, Kenmure, was listed on the National Register of Historic Places in 1988.
