= 10th United States Colored Infantry Regiment =

10th United States Colored Infantry
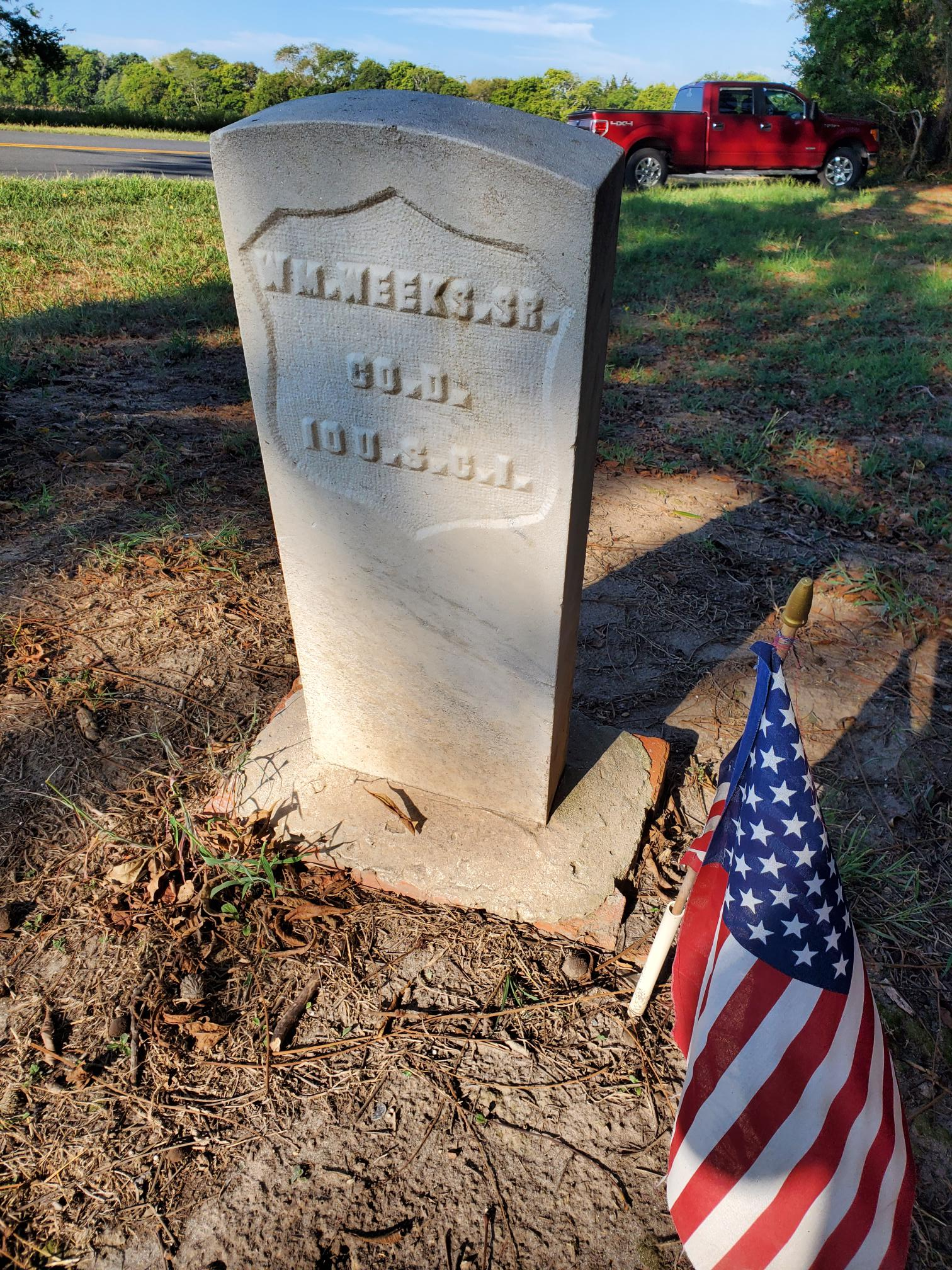
- Active: November 18, 1863 - May 17, 1866
- Country: United States
- Allegiance: Union
- Branch: Infantry
- Engagements: Battle of Plymouth; Siege of Petersburg

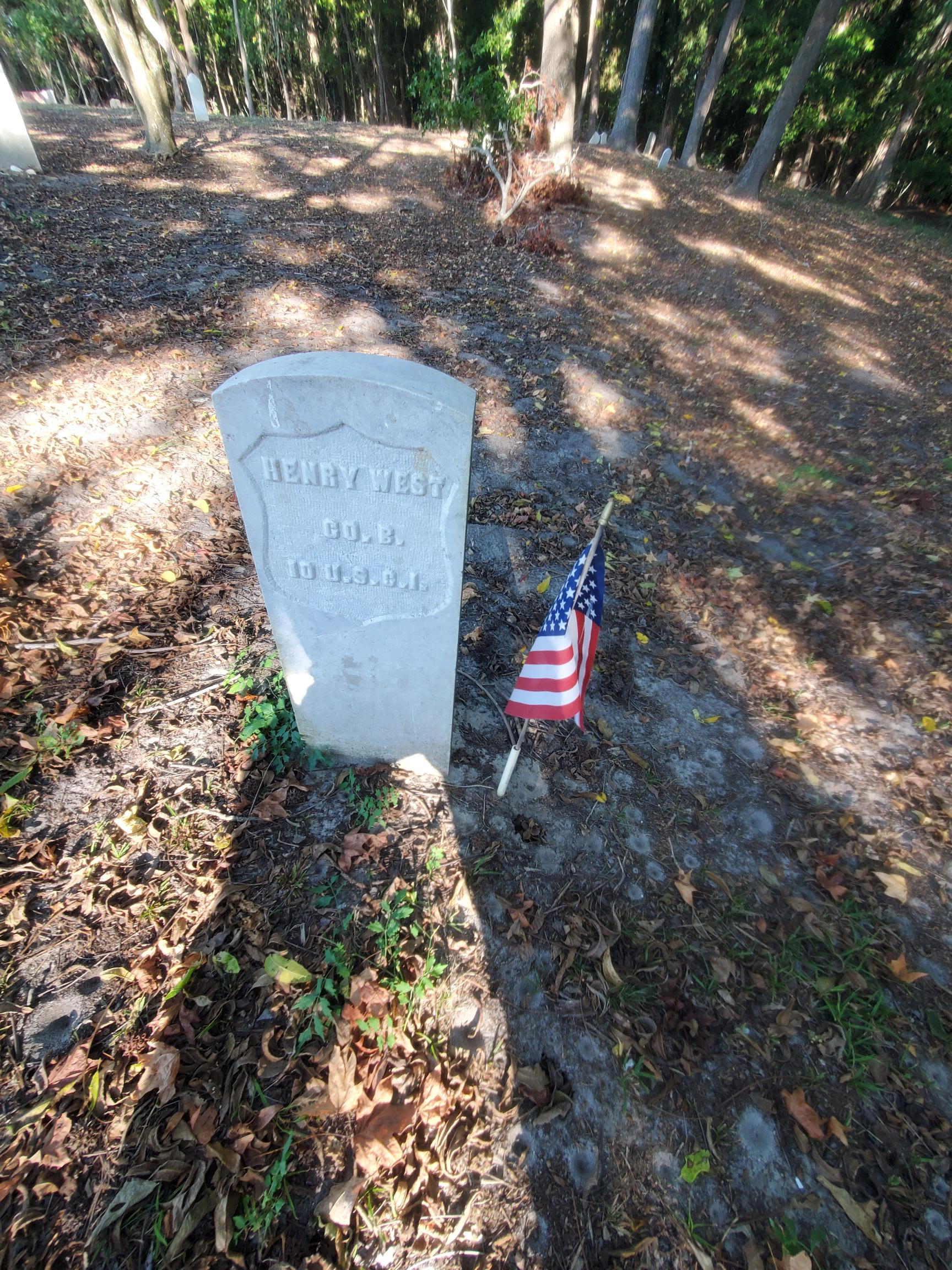

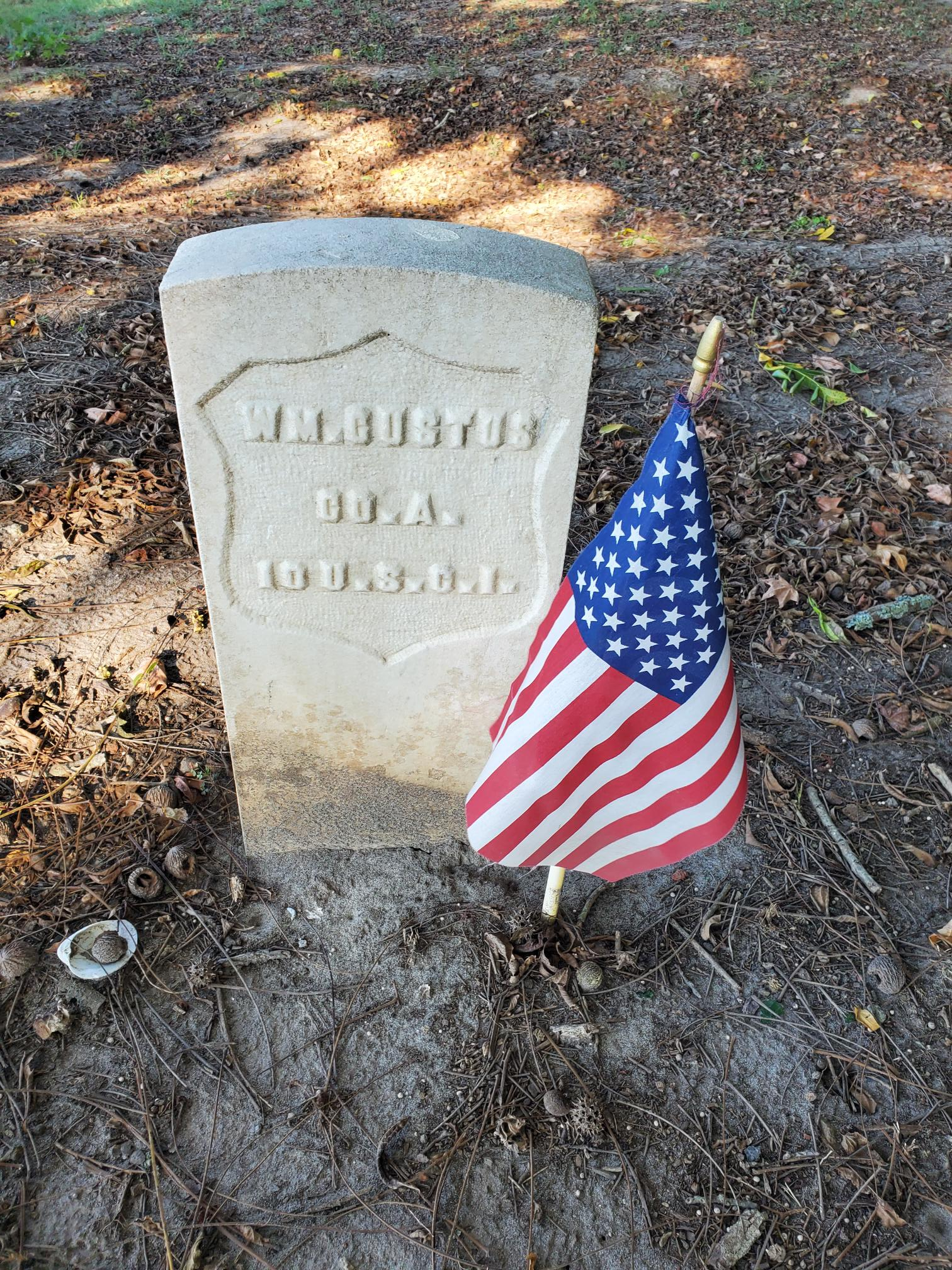

The 10th United States Colored Infantry was an infantry regiment that served in the Union Army during the American Civil War. The regiment was composed of African American enlisted men commanded by white officers and was authorized by the Bureau of Colored Troops which was created by the United States War Department on May 22, 1863.

== Service ==
The 10th U.S. Colored Infantry was organized at Camp Craney Island, Virginia beginning November 18, 1863 and mustered in for three-year service under the command of Colonel Spencer H. Stafford.

The regiment was attached to Drummondstown, Virginia, Department of Virginia and North Carolina, December 1863 to April 1864. 1st Brigade, Hincks' Colored Division, XVIII Corps, Army of the James, Department of Virginia and North Carolina, to June 1864. 1st Brigade, 3rd Division, XVIII Corps, to July 1864. Unattached, XVIII Corps, to August 1864. 3rd Brigade, 3rd Division, XVIII Corps, to December 1864. 3rd Brigade, 1st Division, XXV Corps, to January 1865. 3rd Brigade, 3rd Division, XXV Corps, January 1865. Attached Brigade, 1st Division, XXV Corps, to June 1865. Department of Texas to May 1866.

The 10th U.S. Colored Infantry mustered out of service March 26, 1866.

== Detailed service ==
Camp near Crany Island until January 12, 1864. Moved to Drummondstown, eastern shore of Virginia, and duty there until April. At Yorktown, Va., until May. Butler's operations on the south side of the James River and against Petersburg and Richmond May 4 to June 15. Capture of Fort Powhatan May 5. Wilson's Wharf May 24 (detachment). At Fort Powhatan until July 6. On the Bermuda Hundred front in operations against Petersburg and Richmond until August 27. At City Point, Va., until April 2, 1865. Moved to Bermuda Hundred, then to Richmond April 2–3. Return to City Point April 6, and duty there until June 1. Moved to Texas, and duty at various points on the Rio Grande until May 1866. A detachment served at Plymouth, N.C., November 26, 1863 to April 20, 1864, and participated in the siege of Plymouth April 17–20, 1864, and its surrender on April 20, 1864.

== Commanders ==
- Colonel Spencer H. Stafford
- Colonel Elias Wright

== See also ==
- List of United States Colored Troops Civil War Units
- United States Colored Troops
