= Alfred Terry =

United States Army general (1827–1890)

Alfred H. Terry
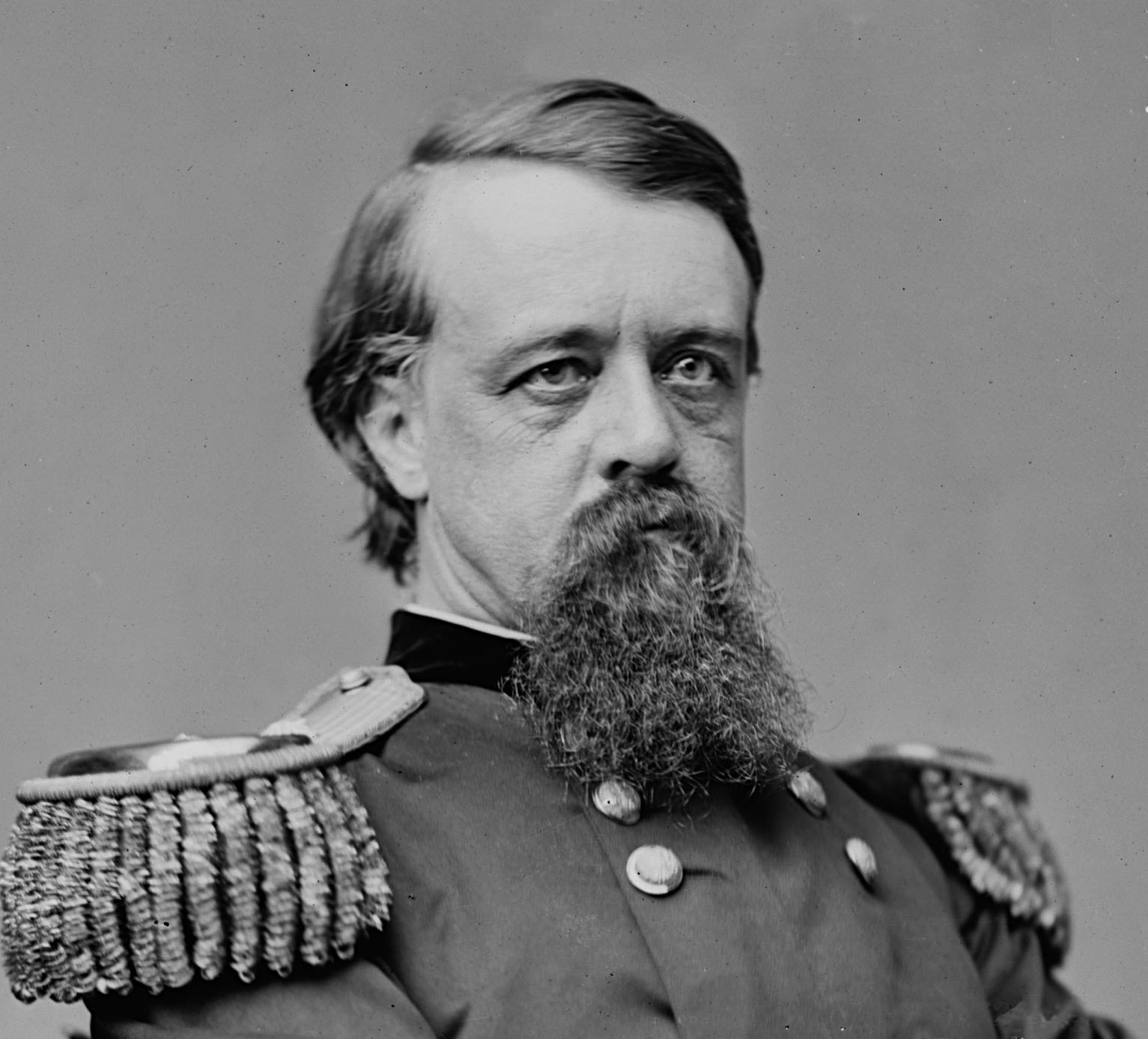
- Born: November 10, 1827; Hartford, Connecticut, U.S.
- Died: December 16, 1890 (aged 63); New Haven, Connecticut, U.S.
- Burial place: Grove Street Cemetery, New Haven, Connecticut, U.S.
- Military career
- Allegiance: United States; Union
- Branch: United States Army; Union Army
- Service years: 1861–1888
- Rank: Major General
- Commands: 2nd Connecticut Volunteer Infantry; X Corps; Military Division of the Missouri
- Conflicts: American Civil War; First Battle of Bull Run; Second Battle of Charleston Harbor; Battle of Proctor's Creek; Siege of Petersburg; Battle of New Market Heights; Second Battle of Fort Fisher; Battle of Wilmington; Great Sioux War of 1876; Nez Perce War
- Awards: Thanks of Congress
- Other work: author

Alfred Howe Terry (November 10, 1827 – December 16, 1890) was a Union general in the American Civil War and the military commander of the Dakota Territory from 1866 to 1869, and again from 1872 to 1886. In 1865, Terry led Union troops to victory at the Second Battle of Fort Fisher in North Carolina.

== Early life and career ==
Although born in Hartford, Connecticut, Alfred Terry's family quickly moved to New Haven, where he spent most of his childhood. Terry graduated from the Hopkins School in New Haven in 1838. After attending Yale Law School in 1848, Terry became a lawyer and was appointed clerk of the Superior Court of New Haven County.

== Civil War ==
=== South Carolina ===
When the Civil War started, Terry raised the 2nd Connecticut Infantry Regiment, and was appointed colonel. The regiment fought at First Bull Run, after which Terry and his regiment were transferred to South Carolina. On September 13, 1861, at New Haven, Connecticut, Col. Terry organized an elite and special regiment, 7th Regiment Connecticut Volunteer Infantry, a three-year regiment, naming Joseph Roswell Hawley, who assisted in raising the regiment, as lieutenant colonel. He was appointed brigadier general of volunteers in April 1862 and placed in command of the Morris Island Division of the X Corps. Terry was heavily involved in the siege operations against Charleston during 1863 and Morris Island, South Carolina. Troops under Terry's direct command were engaged at a skirmish at Grimball's Landing and later succeeded in capturing Fort Wagner in September 1863, but the following year the entire X Corps was sent north to Benjamin Butler's Army of the James in Virginia.

=== Virginia ===
Terry's Morris Island Division was redesignated the 1st Division, X Corps, and fought at the Battle of Proctor's Creek and in the Bermuda Hundred Campaign around Richmond. Once the Siege of Petersburg began, Terry continued to fight in the battles north of the James River, notably at the Battle of New Market Heights. Upon the death of X Corps commander David B. Birney in October, Terry briefly assumed command of the corps before it was dissolved. His leadership was never in question, but he had not achieved the same battlefield glory that many of his counterparts had won by this time in the war.

=== Fort Fisher and North Carolina ===
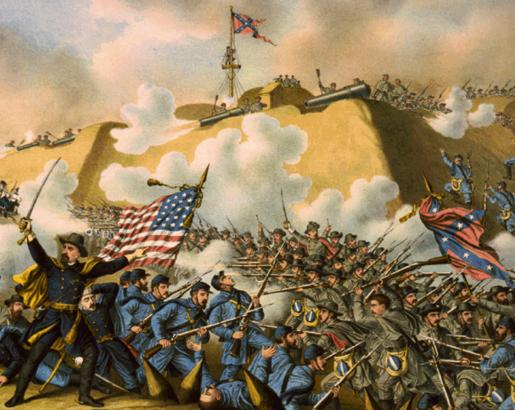
Maj. Gen. Alfred Terry (painting/excerpt 1890): leading the Union Army to capture Fort Fisher in January 1865.

Terry's greatest achievement of the war came when he was placed in command of the Fort Fisher Expeditionary Corps. Benjamin Butler had previously failed in an expedition against Fort Fisher at the end of 1864. Terry had gained the confidence of General Ulysses S. Grant and was now in command of the ground forces in a second expedition against the fort. Unlike Butler, Terry worked well with the Navy under the command of David D. Porter. On January 13, 1865, Terry sent a division of United States Colored Troops to hold off Confederate forces under Braxton Bragg to the north of Fort Fisher. He sent his other division under Adelbert Ames against the northern part of the fort. After hand-to-hand fighting, the Union troops took control of the fort. For his part in the Battle of Fort Fisher, Terry was promoted to major general of volunteers and brigadier general in the regular army. Reinforcements arrived in February and John M. Schofield arrived to take overall command of the campaign against Wilmington, North Carolina. After the fall of Wilmington, the Fort Fisher Expeditionary Corps was renamed the X Corps, with Terry remaining in command, and participated in the final stages of the Carolinas campaign. He is generally considered one of the most capable generals with no previous military training to emerge from the war.

== Postbellum activities ==
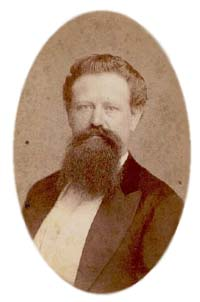
Alfred Terry after the war

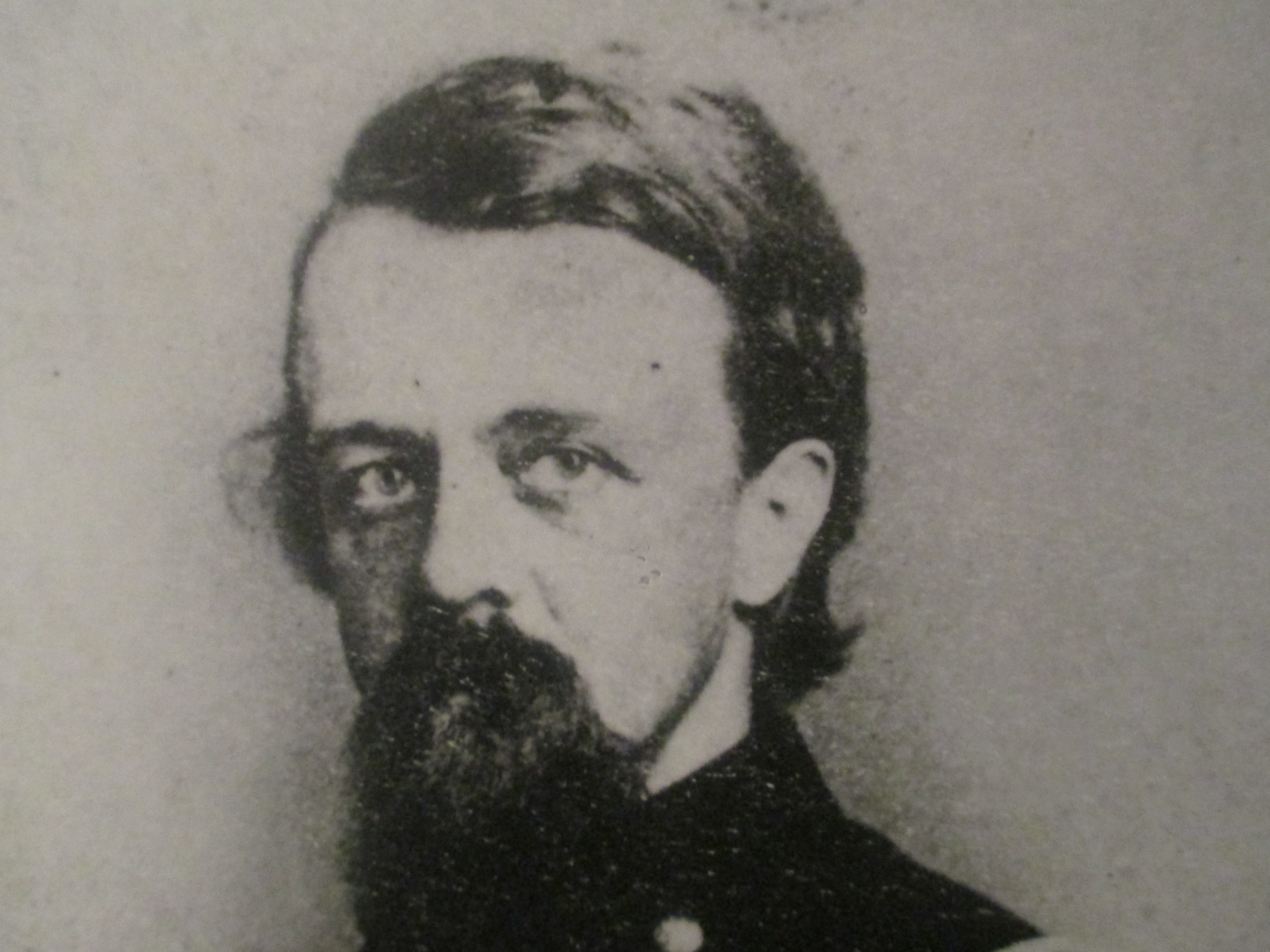
Terry as he appears at the Cape Fear Museum in Wilmington, North Carolina, near which he captured Fort Fisher in 1865.

After the war, Terry remained in the military. He helped to negotiate the Treaty of Fort Laramie (1868), which ended Red Cloud's campaign against American troops in the region. Terry became a strong opponent of the Ku Klux Klan after being assigned as the last military governor of the Third Military District, based in Atlanta, where he served beginning on December 22, 1869.

Terry was the commander of the U.S. Army column marching westward into the Montana Territory during what is now popularly known as the Centennial Campaign of 1876–77. Two other columns marched toward the same objective area (George Crook's from the south and John Gibbon's from the west). A column of troops under his command arrived shortly after the Battle of Little Bighorn and discovered the bodies of Custer's men. His aide-de-camp, Robert Patterson Hughes, who was also his brother-in-law, investigated Custer's activities before and during the battle and authored a critical report. In October 1877, he went to Canada to negotiate with Sitting Bull. He was still in command in Montana during the Nez Perce War and sent reinforcements to intercept Chief Joseph.

In 1878, Terry joined Maj. Gen. John Schofield on a presidential board asked to reexamine the conviction by court-martial of Fitz John Porter. The board found that Porter had been unfairly convicted of cowardice and disobedience.

In 1881, as the Northern Pacific Railway's transcontinental rail line was building across Montana, the new town of Terry, Montana was named in his honor.

In 1886, Terry was promoted to major general and was given command of the Military Division of the Missouri, headquartered in Chicago. He retired from the Army on 5 April 1888. He died two years later in New Haven, Connecticut, where he is buried in Grove Street Cemetery.

General Terry was a First Class Companion of the Military Order of the Loyal Legion of the United States, a military society for officers of the Union Armed Forces and their descendants.

In 1897, construction commenced on Fort Terry, part of the Harbor Defenses of Long Island Sound.

== Media portrayals ==
In 1967, Terry was portrayed by Robert F. Simon (1908–1992) on the ABC television series Custer.

Terry is interpreted by Philippe Noiret in the 1974 Franco-Italian satirical Marco Ferreri movie Don't Touch the White Woman!, a farcical, counter-cultural, highly politicized and surreal re-enactment of the run up to the 1876 Battle of the Little Bighorn.

In 1991, Terry was portrayed by Terry O'Quinn in the television film Son of the Morning Star.

== See also ==
- List of American Civil War generals (Union)
- 7th Regiment Connecticut Volunteer Infantry
- Fort Terry
