= Battle of Wilmington order of battle: Union =

The following Union Army units and commanders fought in the Battle of Wilmington (February 11-22, 1865) of the American Civil War. The Confederate order of battle is listed separately.

== Abbreviations used ==
=== Military Rank ===
- MG = Major General
- BG = Brigadier General
- Col = Colonel
- Ltc = Lieutenant Colonel
- Bvt = Brevet

== Department of North Carolina/Wilmington Expeditionary Force ==
MG John M. Schofield

- Chief Engineer: Bvt BG Cyrus B. Comstock
- Chief Quartermaster: Col George Sullivan Dodge

=== XXIII Corps ===
MG John M. Schofield

Division	Brigade	Regiments and Others
Second Division	2nd Brigade Col Orlando H. Moore	107th Illinois; 80th Indiana; 26th Kentucky; 23rd Michigan; 111th Ohio; 118th Ohio
Third Division; MG Jacob D. Cox	1st Brigade Col Oscar W. Sterl	12th Kentucky; 16th Kentucky; 100th Ohio; 104th Ohio; 8th Tennessee
Third Division; MG Jacob D. Cox	2nd Brigade Bvt BG John S. Casement	65th Illinois; 65th Indiana; 103rd Ohio; 177th Ohio; 5th Tennessee
Third Division; MG Jacob D. Cox	3rd Brigade Bvt BG Thomas J. Henderson	112th Illinois; 63rd Indiana; 140th Indiana
Third Division; MG Jacob D. Cox	Artillery	Battery D, 1st Ohio Light Artillery

=== Terry's Provisional Corps ===
MG Alfred H. Terry

- Chief of Staff - BG Joseph R. Hawley

Division	Brigade	Regiments and Others
First Division (XXIV Corps)	2nd Brigade Bvt BG Joseph C. Abbott	6th Connecticut; 7th Connecticut; 3rd New Hampshire; 7th New Hampshire; 16th New York Heavy Artillery
Second Division (XXIV Corps); BG Adelbert Ames	1st Brigade Col Rufus Daggett	3rd New York; 112th New York; 117th New York; 142nd New York
Second Division (XXIV Corps); BG Adelbert Ames	2nd Brigade Maj Oliver P. Harding until 14 Feb; Ltc James A. Colvin	47th New York; 48th New York; 76th Pennsylvania; 97th Pennsylvania; 203rd Pennsylvania
Second Division (XXIV Corps); BG Adelbert Ames	3rd Brigade Ltc Nathan J. Johnson until 14 Feb; Col George F. Granger	13th Indiana; 9th Maine; 4th New Hampshire; 115th New York; 169th New York
Second Division (XXIV Corps); BG Adelbert Ames	Artillery	1st Connecticut Heavy Artillery Cos. B, G, L; 16th New York Independent Battery Light Artillery; 2nd Pennsylvania Heavy Artillery Co. A
Second Division (XXIV Corps); BG Adelbert Ames	Engineers	15th New York Engineers Cos. A, I
Third Division (XXV Corps); BG Charles J. Paine	1st Brigade Col Delevan Bates	107th U.S. Colored Troops; Other regiments dispersed throughout division
Third Division (XXV Corps); BG Charles J. Paine	2nd Brigade Col John W. Ames	4th U.S. Colored Troops; 6th U.S. Colored Troops; 30th U.S. Colored Troops; 39th U.S. Colored Troops
Third Division (XXV Corps); BG Charles J. Paine	3rd Brigade Col Elias Wright until 20 Feb; Col John Henry Holman	1st U.S. Colored Troops; 5th U.S. Colored Troops; 10th U.S. Colored Troops; 27th U.S. Colored Troops; 37th U.S. Colored Troops
Third Division (XXV Corps); BG Charles J. Paine	Artillery	Battery E, 3rd U.S. Artillery

== North Atlantic Blockading Squadron ==
Rear Admiral David D. Porter

- Cape Fear River
  - USS Bat
  - USS Berberry
  - USS Chippewa
  - USS Emma
  - USS Eolus
  - USS Huron
  - USS Kansas
  - USS Launch No. 1
  - USS Launch No. 6
  - USS Lenapee
  - USS Little Ada
  - USS Mackinaw
  - USS Malvern
  - USS Maratanza
  - USS Maumee
  - USS Moccasin
  - USS Montauk
  - USS Nansemond
  - USS Nyack
  - USS Osceola
  - USS Pawtuxet
  - USS Pequot
  - USS Pontoosuc
  - USS Republic
  - USS Sassacus
  - USS Seneca
  - USS Shawmut
  - USS Unadilla
  - USS Wilderness
  - USS Yantic
- Fort Fisher
  - USS Aries
  - USS Howquah
  - USS Keystone State
  - USS Montgomery
  - USS Monticello
  - USS R. R. Cuyler
  - USS Vicksburg

== See also ==
- North Carolina in the American Civil War
