= Battle of Wilmington order of battle =

The order of battle for the Battle of Wilmington includes:

- Battle of Wilmington order of battle: Confederate
- Battle of Wilmington order of battle: Union
