= USS Bat =

Gunboat of the United States Navy

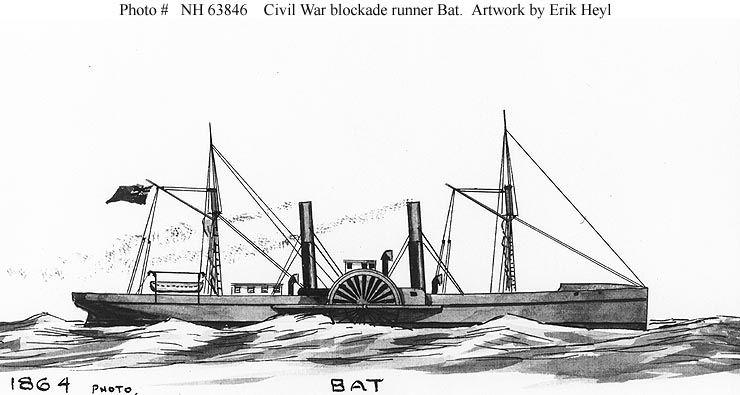
- USS Bat

History

United States
- Commissioned: December 13, 1864
- Decommissioned: May 17, 1865
- Captured: by Union Navy forces; October 8, 1864
- Fate: Sold, May 25, 1865

General characteristics
- Displacement: 750 long tons (760 t)
- Length: 230 ft (70 m)
- Beam: 26 ft (7.9 m)
- Draft: 8 ft (2.4 m)
- Depth of hold: 12 ft (3.7 m)
- Propulsion: steam engine; side wheel-propelled
- Speed: 16 knots (30 km/h; 18 mph)
- Complement: 82
- Armament: one 30-pounder Parrott rifle; two 12-pounder smoothbore guns

USS Bat was a steamer captured by the Union Navy during the American Civil War. She was used by the Union Navy as a gunboat in support of the Union Navy blockade of Confederate waterways. She was also later assigned to carry President Abraham Lincoln to Richmond, Virginia.

== Service history ==
Bat was a very fast, steel-hulled, side-wheel steamer built in 1864 at Liverpool, England, for private speculators by Jones Quiggins and Co., Ltd. Their plan called for her to run through the Union blockade with highly profitable cargo desperately needed by the beleaguered South and then to slip back out to sea again, laden with cotton for the idle textile mills of England. However, early in September—while the ship was still on the stocks, but too far advanced to be modified significantly—she was purchased for the Confederate Government by Capt. James D. Bullock, CSN. Laden with heavy machinery and a large quantity of office supplies—including a goodly amount of red tape—required by Jefferson Davis' administration, the side wheeler put to sea on September 6 and proceeded under the command of veteran blockade tester, A. Hora—a reserve officer of the Royal Navy—to Halifax, Nova Scotia. After re-coaling at that port, the ship sailed for the North Carolina coast.

Meanwhile, Thomas H. Dudley, the American consul at Liverpool, had taken pains to learn of Bullock's activities and had informed Washington, D.C., of the South's purchase of Bat and of that ship's departure from the British Isles. As the blockade runner approached the Cape Fear River on the night of October 8, Union warships in the vicinity had been alerted and were expecting her. First met by Eolus, Bat retired down the coast to the vicinity of Georgetown, South Carolina, remained anchored there throughout the 9th, and weighed anchor again in the wee hours of the 10th to begin another attempt to speed through the Union line into Wilmington, North Carolina.

Upon nearing the western bar, she encountered Emma which ship gave chase, opened fire, and sent up rockets to announce the presence and course of the stranger. After Bat quickly outdistanced that steamer, Vicksburg began pursuing the speedy Southern ship, but soon lost sight of her quarry and hove to when she reached the outer edge of her assigned area. Finally, Montgomery spotted Bat, opened fire, and struck the fleeing vessel in her forecastle, killing an Austrian seaman named Mateh Madick who had been the captain of the forecastle of CSS Alabama during that Confederate cruiser's recent epic battle with USS Kearsarge. Soon thereafter, Bat surrendered and was sent to Beaufort, North Carolina, under a prize crew commanded by Acting Ensign Robert Wiley. From that port, she steamed on to Boston, Massachusetts, where she was condemned by an admiralty court.

=== Union Navy career ===
Purchased by the United States Government for service in the Union Navy, the side wheeler was repaired, fitted out at the Boston Navy Yard, and placed in commission there on December 13, 1864, Lt. Comdr. John S. Barnes in command. Assigned to the North Atlantic Blockading Squadron, Bat soon sailed for Hampton Roads, Virginia, but encountered a severe storm during her voyage south and lost her foremast. Sent to the Washington Navy Yard for repairs, the steamer remained there until mid January 1865. On the 23d, when Bat finally joined her squadron off Wilmington, North Carolina—where recently a fleet commanded by Rear Admiral David Dixon Porter had cooperated with Army troops in the final major combined operation of the Civil War, the capture of Fort Fisher—Porter decided to take advantage of her great speed by using her as a dispatch vessel. On the day of the steamer's arrival, she began a cruise south through the Confederacy's inland waters as far down the coast as Georgetown, South Carolina. Her mission was to attempt to communicate with General William Tecumseh Sherman who—after completing his march from Atlanta, Georgia, through Georgia to the sea—had swung north to move his army toward Richmond, Virginia, in support of General Ulysses S. Grant's operations against the Confederate capital. This assignment kept the side wheeler busy through the end of January when Porter called her back to the Cape Fear River. For more than a month thereafter, the admiral used the steamer in maintaining quick communication within his squadron, occasionally breaking his flag in her.

==== Escorting President Lincoln ====
An interesting period for Bat—one in which she rendered her most notable service—began on March 20 when General Grant invited the President to visit his headquarters at City Point, Virginia. At this time both the Commander-in-Chief and Mrs. Lincoln were worn out by the burdens of presiding over the wartime White House. Each was completely drained of strength by almost four years of the most bloody fratricidal war; by grief over the loss of their son, Willie; and by the sadness of knowing that the men in Mrs. Lincoln's family had been fighting for the Southern cause. Thus the President welcomed an opportunity to get away from Washington while visiting the Union troops beleaguering Richmond. Since Bat was the fastest vessel in the North Atlantic Blockading Squadron, the Navy ordered her to Washington so that she might carry Mr. Lincoln to Grant's headquarters on the James River. The speedy steamer reached the Washington Navy Yard late on the 20th, and Lt. Comdr. Barnes reported in person to Assistant Secretary of the Navy Gustavus Fox. The two men arranged to have suitable accommodations for the President installed in Bat and then proceeded together to the Executive Mansion, where they discussed the proposed voyage with Mr. Lincoln.

The next day, Barnes was summoned back to the White House and told by the President that Mrs. Lincoln had decided to accompany him to City Point. Because Bat was not outfitted to accommodate ladies and could not be readily made so, the work on her was stopped; and another fast steamer, the River Queen, was found for the task. Accordingly, Bat's role was changed to escorting the President's unarmed ship during her voyage to the James. She was to stay with River Queen throughout his visit and then to accompany her back to Washington. Plots against the President had been discovered soon after Lincoln's election in the autumn of 1860 and had continued to be hatched throughout his time in office. Consequently, fear for his safety was strong in the Navy Department, especially during the final phase of the war when frustration and hostility in many Southern hearts were being inflamed by growing certainty that the collapse of the Confederacy was imminent. Moreover, besides the threat of assassination, naval leaders were also worried by the possibility that the President's ship would strike a mine or come to grief in some other way. The previous autumn—during a conference to plan an expedition against Fort Fisher – Greyhound, an Army transport similar in design to River Queen – had been set afire by a bomb disguised as a lump of coal that exploded in her boiler. On that occasion, General Benjamin F. Butler and Rear Admiral David Dixon Porter had barely escaped from the blazing vessel with their lives.

Thus, Bat's mission was considered to be of the utmost importance. She was to protect the River Queen from attackers of any sort; and, should his ship be damaged, she was to take Mr. Lincoln and his party on board and to carry them to safety. The two ships got underway on the afternoon of March 23, stopped at Fortress Monroe the next morning to get fresh water for use of the President who had become ill the previous night after drinking contaminated water from River Queen's tanks, and anchored off City Point late that night. During the ensuing days, Lt. Comdr. Barnes was a frequent companion of the President, both afloat and during excursions ashore. On the evening of the 27th, General William Tecumseh Sherman arrived at City Point for conferences with General Grant and the President. Sherman's absence from his army during this critical phase of the war caused Lincoln great uneasiness and brought orders for Barnes to return the general in Bat to his troops in North Carolina with the greatest possible despatch. After filling her coal bunkers and taking on provisions, Bat—with Sherman; the General's brother, Senator John Sherman; the son and confidential clerk of the Secretary of War, Edwin Lamson Stanton; and a number of prominent Army officers embarked—got underway on the morning of the 28th and proceeded at top speed to New Bern, North Carolina, which she reached late on the evening of the 30th. After disembarking her passengers and refueling, she began the run back to the James the next day and reached City Point on the evening of April 2.

By this time, the defensive works that had protected the Confederate capital had crumbled. The First Lady—after being indisposed during much of her visit to City Point—had returned to Washington; and her husband had joined Porter in the Admiral's flagship, Malvern. About mid morning on the 4th, Bat got underway to follow Malvern and River Queen up the James toward Richmond, as those ships threaded their way along a channel cleared of mines and obstructions. When Malvern ran aground a short distance below the Confederate capital, Porter invited the President into his barge, in which they were rowed ashore. Barnes followed in a boat from Bat and accompanied Lincoln when he visited the Southern executive mansion—from which President Jefferson Davis had just fled—and during much of his subsequent tour of the burning city. That evening, Lincoln and Porter reembarked in Malvern and Barnes in Bat. The next day, Mrs. Lincoln returned from Washington to the James; and, after she had visited Richmond on the 7th, plans were laid for the First Family's voyage back to Washington.

Meanwhile, the Navy had received reports of a Confederate plot to capture the ferry at Havre de Grace, Maryland, and of Southern plans to launch other actions in the Chesapeake Bay which might be dangerous to the President. As a precaution, Barnes assigned two officers and a guard of sailors—presumably from Bat—to River Queen with instructions to guard Lincoln. Bat escorted River Queen to City Point on the evening of the 7th, and the two ships sailed for Washington the next morning. Barnes remained in the latter with the President as the two ships dropped down the river, leaving Bat under temporary command of her executive officer, but resumed command of his own ship at Fortress Monroe for the run up the Chesapeake Bay and the Potomac River to the Federal capital. Upon leaving the salt water of the bay and entering the fresh water of the river, Bat developed foam in her boilers which lowered her steam pressure and slowed her engines. This forced her to fall behind River Queen and allowed the President's ship to reach the Washington Navy Yard ahead of her. When Bat was moored at the yard on the 10th, she learned that General Robert E. Lee had surrendered his Army of Northern Virginia at Appomattox Courthouse the day before.

Following brief repairs, Bat headed down river on the 11th and anchored in Hampton Roads the next day. Awaiting her was word that Porter expected to be there on the 13th and orders to be ready to take him to Washington. However, the admiral did not arrive until the 14th and then remained in Tristram Shandy, the ship that had brought him from City Point, for the remainder of the homeward voyage. On the morning of the 15th, lookouts in Bat received a signal from Monodnock ordering the dispatch ship's commanding officer to come on board. Bat remained in Hampton Roads for the next few weeks waiting for instructions to assist in efforts to capture the President's assassins or for orders to pursue any officials of the fallen Confederate government who might attempt to escape by sea. Such a message never arrived. On May 6, 1865, Bat was ordered to Washington, D.C. Decommissioned at New York City on the 17th, the ship was sold at public auction there on May 25, 1865, to Russell Surgiss and Associates and was documented on November 6, 1865, as Teaser.

=== Civilian career ===
In merchant service, the former Bat operated between ports on the U.S. East Coast—especially New York City and Boston, Massachusetts—and New Orleans, Louisiana. In 1871, she was sold to a Canadian owner, renamed Miramichi and subsequently operated between ports on the St. Lawrence River and in the Gulf of Newfoundland. In 1902, the ship was acquired by the Richelieu and Ontario Steam Navigation Co.; and, soon thereafter, she was scrapped.
