= USS Kansas (1863) =

Gunboat of the United States Navy

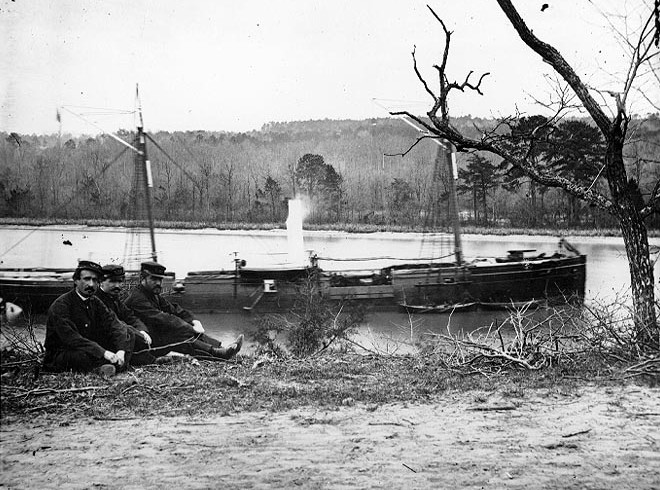
- USS Kansas on the James River, Virginia, circa February–April 1865. Note her white smokestack, and three officers seated on shore.

History

United States
- Namesake: the Kansas River
- Builder: Philadelphia Navy Yard
- Launched: 29 September 1863
- Commissioned: 21 December 1863
- Decommissioned: 10 August 1875
- Fate: Sold 27 September 1883 at Rockland, Maine

General characteristics
- Displacement: 625 tons
- Length: 129 ft 6 in (39.47 m)
- Beam: 29 ft (8.8 m)
- Draft: 10 ft 6 in (3.20 m)
- Propulsion: steam engine, screw propelled
- Speed: 12 knots (22 km/h; 14 mph)
- Complement: 108
- Armament: 1 × 150-pounder rifle; 2 × 12-pounder rifles; 2 × 20-pounder Dahlgren rifles; 2 × 9 in (229 mm) Dahlgren smoothbores

USS Kansas was a gunboat constructed for the Union Navy during the American Civil War. She was outfitted with heavy guns and assigned to the Union blockade of the waterways of the Confederate States of America. She was the first U.S. Navy ship to be named Kansas and was the first of a class of 836-ton screw steam gunboats. At war's end, she continued serving her country by performing survey work and defending American interests in Cuba until sold in 1883.

== Service history ==
Kansas was built at Philadelphia Navy Yard with machinery taken from the cargo of prize steamer Princess Royal. She was launched on 29 September 1863; sponsored by Miss Annie McClellan; and commissioned at Philadelphia, Pennsylvania 21 December 1863, Lieutenant Commander Pendleton G. Watmough in command. On the day of her commissioning, the gunboat was ordered to Hampton Roads, Virginia, to join the North Atlantic Blockading Squadron. She arrived Newport News, Virginia, 30 December; but engine and boiler trouble required her to return to the Washington Navy Yard for repairs.

=== American Civil War operations ===
In March 1864 the gunboat was stationed at Wilmington, North Carolina, off New Inlet, where she served during most of the remainder of the war. With Mount Vernon, Howquah, and Nansemond, she engaged Confederate ironclad-ram Raleigh, (Flag Officer William Lynch) which had steamed over the bar at New Inlet 6 May to attack the Northern blockaders. The withering fire from the Union ships caused Raleigh to withdraw toward safety within the harbor, but she grounded and broke her back while attempting to cross the bar at the mouth of the Cape Fear River. After strenuous efforts to save the stricken vessel proved fruitless, she was destroyed to prevent her falling into Union hands.

Shortly before dawn 15 May, Kansas ended a two-hour chase by capturing British steamer Tristram Shandy as the blockade runner attempted to escape to sea with a cargo of cotton, tobacco, and turpentine. The next day the proud gunboat towed her prize into Beaufort, North Carolina. On her return passage she brought Colonel James Jourdan to reconnoiter Confederate defenses at Fort Fisher in preparation for future attacks. Throughout the night of 27–28 May, Kansas chased a blockade-running steamer which finally escaped. That morning boiler trouble prevented her getting underway to chase another steamer which dashed out from Wilmington. After remaining on blockade duty at New Inlet until August, the gunboat returned to Philadelphia for repairs.

Kansas rejoined her squadron late in September; and, after briefly cruising at sea, she returned to her old station off New Inlet in mid-October. There she chased and headed off steamer Annie trying to slip out of New Inlet with a cargo of cotton. This action 31 October enabled Wilderness and Niphon to capture the chase a short time later. On 7 December, while Admiral David Dixon Porter and General Benjamin F. Butler planned joint operations against Wilmington to close that vital Confederate port once and for all, Kansas was one of the Union gunboats which were making blockade-running in that quarter hazardous. That day they forced steamer Stormy Petrel ashore where she was abandoned by her crew and, a few days later, destroyed by a gale.

At daylight Christmas Eve, Kansas was part of the huge fleet which formed in line of battle before Fort Fisher and pounded the formidable Confederate works with a furious bombardment. Although the cannonade drove the staunch Southern defenders from their guns to shelter in bombproofs, transports carrying the Union soldiers did not arrive from Beaufort until too late to launch the assault that day. The next morning, the ships again opened fire on the forts and maintained the bombardment while troops landed near Flag Pond Battery, north of the main defensive works. Some 2,000 men established a beachhead under the protection of naval gunfire which kept the Confederate garrison pinned down and away from their guns. Late that afternoon, supported by heavy fire from the Union ships, Union Army skirmishers advanced to within yards of the fort. Lt. Aeneas Armstrong of the Confederate Navy later described the effectiveness of the bombardment, "The whole of the interior of the fort, which consists of sand, merlons, etc., was as one 11 inch shell bursting. You can not inspect the works and walk on nothing but iron."

However, General Butler, considering the works too strong to be carried by assault with the troops available, aborted the operation by ordering his troops to re-embark. Undaunted by this setback, the Navy was not to be denied. At Porter's request Grant sent him a new commander. Kansas was one of some five dozen ships which Porter sent against Fort Fisher 13 January 1865. A naval landing party of 2,000 sailors and marines reinforced 8,000 soldiers under Major General Alfred H. Terry. The ensuing onslaught was a classic example of complete Army-Navy coordination. New Ironsides led three monitors to within 1,000 yards of Fort Fisher and opened on its batteries. Meanwhile, Kansas and the other wooden warships formed in line of battle in close order and shelled Flag Pond Battery and the adjacent woods at 0715. Half an hour later they sent in boats to assist in disembarking the landing party which went ashore out of range of the fort's guns.

Once the beachhead had been established, Kansas stood toward Fort Fisher to join in the bombardment of the main Confederate works. She continued the bombardment intermittently for the next 2 days. Shortly before noon 15 January, her launch went ashore with 20 men to join the naval brigade for the final push. The gunboat maintained heavy fire during the following hours while soldiers, sailors, and marines braved the deadly fire of the stouthearted Southern defenders. Finally, at 2200, loud cheering and illumination of the fleet announced the fall of the forts. After cleanup operations in the Wilmington area, Kansas moved to the James River late in February to support General Grant's final drive to Richmond, Virginia. From time to time during the closing weeks of the war, Kansas supported Union Army operations ashore with her guns, particularly near Petersburg, Virginia. The day after General Robert E. Lee surrendered at Appomattox Court House, the gunboat was ordered to a station off Cape Henry to prevent the escape of Confederate sympathizers who were reportedly planning to capture vessels in the bay.

== Post-war operations ==
Kansas entered the Philadelphia Navy Yard 23 April and decommissioned 4 May. She recommissioned 28 July, Lt. Cmdr. Clark H. Wells in command, and departed Philadelphia 5 August to begin a 4-year voyage in the South Atlantic Ocean which took her to Cape Town, Africa, as well as to many ports in the Caribbean and South America. In January 1869, she ran aground at Valparaíso, Chile. This long and interesting deployment ended 15 September 1869, when the gunboat arrived Washington Navy Yard, where she decommissioned a week later.

After a year in ordinary at Washington, D.C., she recommissioned 26 September 1870, Lt. Cmdr. Norman H. Farquhar in command. She stood down the Potomac River 10 October and arrived Hampton Roads 3 days later to join Mayflower for the Tehuantepec surveying-expedition sent to southern Mexico to determine the feasibility of constructing an inter-oceanic canal across the Isthmus of Tehuantepec which separates the Gulf of Mexico from the Pacific Ocean. The ships sailed via Key West for Vera Cruz 14 October. The expedition carefully surveyed the narrow neck of land and recorded invaluable scientific information making "many calculations to prove that a ship-canal across the Isthmus of Tehuantepec is not only practicable, but that the obstacles in the way of the canal route are of the most ordinary nature."

When she returned to Washington 15 June 1871, her crew was seriously debilitated by fever contracted in the tropics. As a result, she was ordered to the North Atlantic to join a special squadron under Vice Admiral Stephen Rowen at Portsmouth, New Hampshire. She stood in to Staten Island 10 October to participate in the reception given the Russian Fleet. She departed New York Harbor 29 November for Cuba and arrived Havana, Cuba, in December. The gunboat left that port 25 February 1872 to obtain supplies and await Comdr. A. F. Grossman who headed another Nicaragua-surveying expedition. Comdr. A. F. Grossman (ref. states 'Crosman') and others were drowned near Greytown, Nicaragua, 12 April 1872, and by personal exertion, seaman Austin Denham, chief quarter gunner George Hill, seaman John Johnson, boatswain's mate John O'Neal, seaman Richard Pile, and seaman James Smith prevented greater loss of life, for which they each earned the Medal of Honor. Kansas was employed gathering data on potential inter-oceanic canal routes until returning to Key West, Florida, on 13 July.

Kansas departed Key West 6 August to determine positions for a submarine cable between Key West and Havana and returned a week later. She departed Key West 21 August and arrived Halifax, Nova Scotia, 5 September. She stood out of Halifax 17 September and arrived New York City 21 November after visiting Salem, Massachusetts, and Newport, Rhode Island, en route. She got underway for another surveying expedition of Central America 1 January 1873, which ended when she returned to Key West 15 July.

In November, Spanish authorities in Cuba seized arms-running ship Virginius, illegally flying the American flag on the high seas, and summarily shot 53 of her passengers and crew. On hearing of this incident, Wyoming sailed without orders to Santiago, Cuba, and entered a vigorous protest. Kansas stood out of New York on 14 November to assist Wyoming in representing the nation's interests. After battling severe weather, she arrived Santiago, Cuba, 2 December. As a host of other warships from the U.S. Navy's North Atlantic, South Atlantic, and European squadrons converged on Cuba, the 102 survivors of Virginius were taken to New York. Kansas returned to Key West Christmas Day. In February 1874 she participated in a naval drill in Florida Bay. Her final year of active service was devoted to cruising in the Caribbean Sea and the Gulf of Mexico, at the time a region of considerable unrest. She sailed from Pensacola, Florida 8 July 1875, and arrived Portsmouth on the 21st. Kansas decommissioned there 10 August 1875 and laid up until sold at Rockland, Maine, to Captain Israel L. Snow 27 September 1883.
