= USS Preston (1864) =

Gunboat of the United States Navy

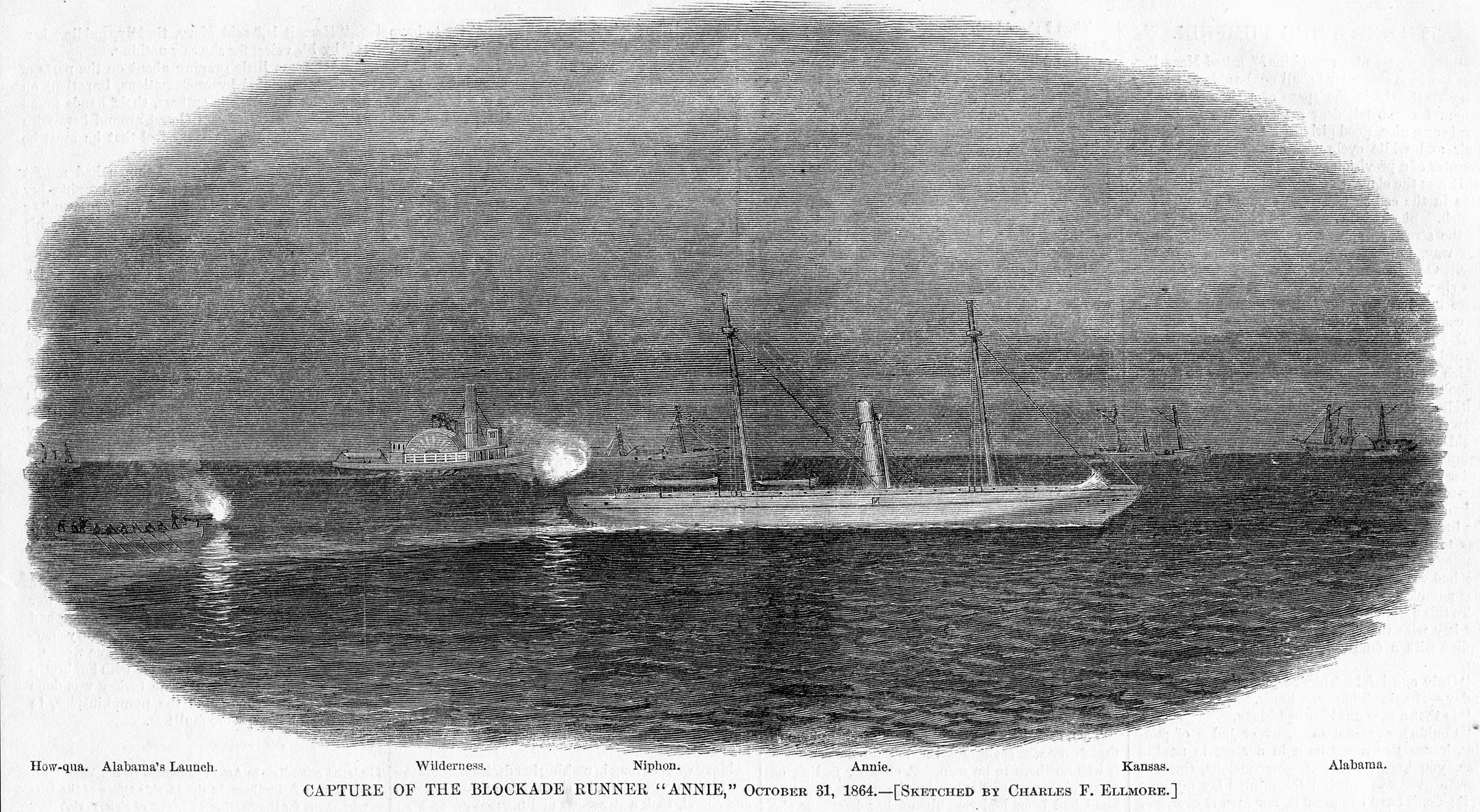
- Capture of the blockade runner Annie.

History

United States
- Acquired: December 1864
- Commissioned: 6 February 1865
- Decommissioned: 8 August 1865
- Captured: 31 October 1864
- Fate: Sold, 30 August 1865

General characteristics
- Displacement: 428 tons
- Length: 170 ft (52 m)
- Beam: 23 ft 1 in (7.04 m)
- Depth of hold: 13 ft 4 in (4.06 m)
- Propulsion: steam engine; screw-propelled

USS Preston was a blockade-running steamer originally named Annie that was captured by the Union Navy during the American Civil War.

She was placed in service on the Gulf of Mexico by the Union Navy as a gunboat during blockade operations against the Confederate States of America.

== Service history ==
Annie was a twin screw British blockade runner named Annie, and was captured off New Inlet, North Carolina, 31 October 1864 by USS Wilderness and USS Niphon. She was purchased by the Navy from the New York City Prize Court in December 1864 and was renamed Preston on 2 February 1865. The ship was commissioned on 6 February 1865, Acting Volunteer Lt. J. R. Wheeler in command. Assigned to the West Gulf Blockading Squadron, Preston departed New York City on 16 February and arrived at New Orleans, Louisiana on 9 March. She operated along the Texas coast into July and on the 25th was ordered to Philadelphia, Pennsylvania. Decommissioned in Philadelphia on 8 August 1865, she was sent to New York City in November and sold at auction on the 30th.

== See also ==
- Blockade runners of the American Civil War
- Blockade mail of the Confederacy
