= USS Wilmington =

Only one vessel of the United States Navy has been named USS Wilmington, after the city of Wilmington, Delaware, although the name was intended for two others.

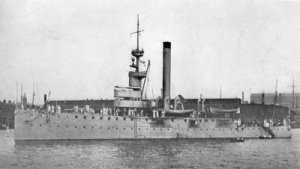
USS Wilmington (PG-8)

- The only completed USS Wilmington (PG-8) was Gunboat No. 8, commissioned in 1897, renamed Dover in 1941, and continuing in service until 1945.
- What was to be the second USS Wilmington (CL-79), a Cleveland-class light cruiser, was completed as the Independence-class light aircraft carrier USS Cabot (CVL-28).
- Another light cruiser of the Fargo class, USS Wilmington (CL-111), was laid down in March 1945, but suspended in August and later scrapped.

== See also ==
- CSS Wilmington, a casemate ironclad built for the Confederate States Navy
