= CSS Wilmington =

Confederate States Navy's unnamed casemate ironclad

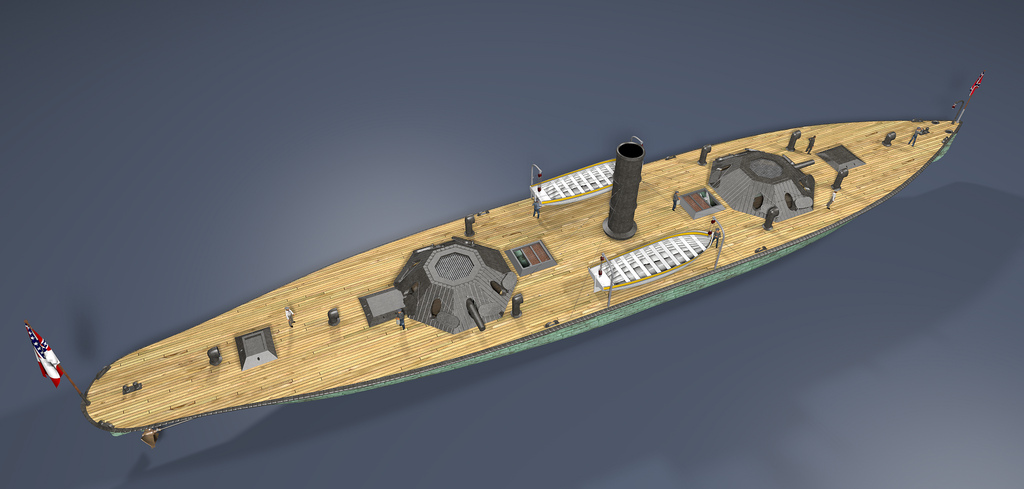
- A speculative computer model of CSS Wilmington had she been completed

History

Confederate States of America
- Name: Wilmington
- Namesake: Wilmington, North Carolina
- Builder: Berry Brothers shipyard, Wilmington, North Carolina
- Laid down: 1864
- Fate: Burned, c. 22 February 1865

General characteristics
- Type: Casemate ironclad
- Length: 233 ft 4 in (71.1 m) (o/a)
- Beam: 41 ft (12.5 m)
- Draft: 9 ft 6 in (2.9 m)
- Depth: 12 ft (3.7 m)
- Installed power: 4 × boilers
- Propulsion: 2 × propellers; 2 × geared direct-acting steam engines
- Armament: 2 × guns

CSS Wilmington was an unnamed casemate ironclad built for the Confederate States Navy during the American Civil War. The ship was never officially named and is referred to by historians by the name of the city in which she was built. Wilmington was still under construction during the February 1865 Battle of Wilmington and was destroyed to prevent her capture by Union troops after their victory.

== Background and description ==
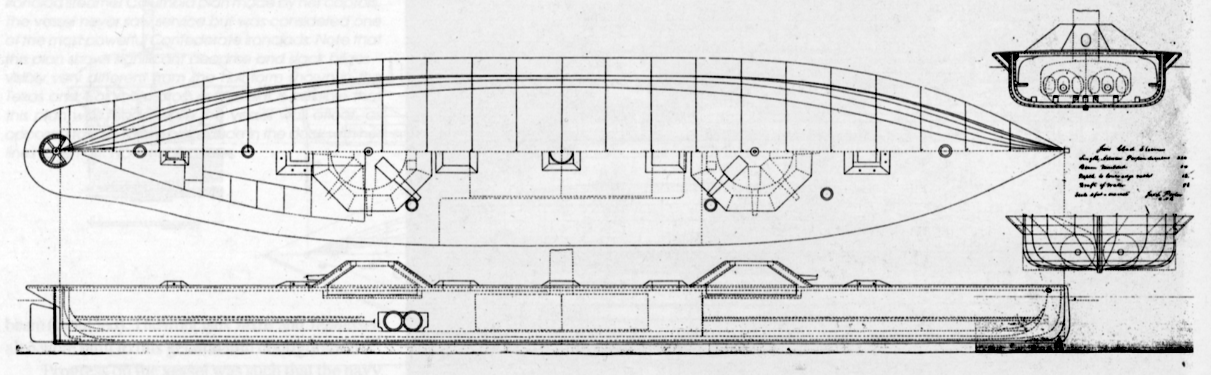
Original plan of CSS Wilmington, c. June 1864

Wilmington was designed by the Chief Naval Constructor, John L. Porter, as a replacement for the rotten ironclad CSS North Carolina and the wrecked ironclad CSS Raleigh for the defenses of the Cape Fear River in North Carolina in 1864. Unlike those ships, Wilmington may have been designed to force engagements on the Union blockaders as her sleek lines and powerful propulsion machinery suggest something more than a defensive role.

The ship had an overall length of 223 feet 4 inches (68.1 m), a beam of 41 feet (12.5 m) and a draft of 9 feet 6 inches (2.9 m). Her depth of hold was 12 feet (3.7 m), but no tonnage or displacement figures are available as Wilmington was destroyed before she could be launched. The ship was fitted with two small pilot houses, one each fore and aft of the casemates, that were shaped like truncated pyramids.

She was powered by a pair of high-pressure horizontal single-cylinder direct-acting steam engines that had a 28-inch (710 mm) bore and a 24-inch (610 mm) stroke. Each engine drove an 8-foot (2.4 m) propeller via 4-foot-6-inch (1.4 m) and 3-foot (0.9 m) gears, using steam provided by four tubular boilers. The propellers were connected by an idler shaft which prevented them from rotating at different speeds, which would have significantly inhibited the ship's maneuverability. All of the propulsion machinery was built by the Columbus Naval Iron Works in Columbus, Georgia, but had not been delivered before Wilmington was destroyed.

The ship's main battery consisted of two guns of an unknown type on pivot mounts, each of which was housed in a small octagonal casemate. Each casemate had seven gun ports. The thickness of Wilmington's wrought-iron armor is unknown.

== Construction and fate ==
Porter visited Wilmington at the direction of Stephen Mallory, the Confederate States Secretary of the Navy, in late May 1864 after the first two ironclads built at Wilmington were lost or became ineffective; Raleigh was run aground and was wrecked on the sandbar at the mouth of the Cape Fear River on 7 May and North Carolina due to the green wood of her hull rotting and attacks by shipworms. Porter produced his design for Wilmington shortly afterwards and the ship was laid down at the Berry Brothers shipyard on Eagles Island across the river from the city. Although she reportedly used armor salvaged from the two earlier ironclads, Wilmington was still on the stocks when the Union captured the city on 22 February 1865. She was burned by the retreating Confederate troops to prevent her capture.

== Bibliography ==
- Bisbee, Saxon T. (2018). Engines of Rebellion: Confederate Ironclads and Steam Engineering in the American Civil War. Tuscaloosa, Alabama: University of Alabama Press. ISBN 978-0-81731-986-1.
- Canney, Donald L. (2015). The Confederate Steam Navy 1861–1865. Atglen, Pennsylvania: Schiffer Publishing. ISBN 978-0-7643-4824-2.
- Silverstone, Paul H. (2006). Civil War Navies 1855–1883. The U.S. Navy Warship Series. New York: Routledge. ISBN 0-415-97870-X.
