= USS Calypso (1863) =

Gunboat of the United States Navy

History

United States
- Laid down: date unknown
- Launched: date unknown
- Acquired: 12 October 1863
- Commissioned: 24 September 1863
- Decommissioned: 15 August 1865
- Stricken: 1865 (est.)
- Captured: by Union Navy forces; 11 June 1863
- Fate: Sold, 30 November 1865

General characteristics
- Displacement: 630 tons
- Length: 175 ft 2 in (53.39 m)
- Beam: 26 ft 6 in (8.08 m)
- Draught: 12 ft (3.7 m)
- Propulsion: steam engine; screw propelled
- Speed: 12 knots
- Complement: 70 officers and enlisted
- Armament: two 30-pounder rifled guns; four 24-pounder rifled guns

The first USS Calypso was a steamer captured by the Union Navy during the American Civil War.

Calypso was used by the Navy as a gunboat, and was ordered to patrol navigable waterways of the Confederacy to prevent the South from trading with other countries.

== Calypso captured by Union Navy forces ==
Calypso, an armed streamer, was captured 11 June 1863 off Wilmington, North Carolina, by USS Florida; purchased from the prize court 12 October 1863; and commissioned 24 September 1863, Acting Master F. D. Stuart in command.

== Civil War service ==
=== Assigned to the North Atlantic Blockade ===
Calypso joined the North Atlantic Blockading Squadron off Wilmington, North Carolina, and on 24 October 1863, took her first prize off Frying Pan Shoals, the schooner Herald. Returning to Norfolk, Virginia, in November for repairs, the steamer was back on duty off Wilmington 31 March 1864.

In June she joined with USS Nansemond in sailing to New River Inlet to support the Union Army in an expedition to cut the Wilmington and Weldon Railroad. The troops were successfully landed from Nansemond in boats from both ships on 21 June, and through the next days, Calypso's boats patrolled up the river and carried supplies to the Army. When Confederate opposition prevented the linkup of the landing party with a force moving overland, Calypso swiftly evacuated the soldiers.

=== Patrolling for blockade runners from the Bahama Islands ===
Through the summer, Calypso patrolled the track of ships attempting to run the blockade from Nassau, Bahamas, and on 28 October 1864, after a long chase and last minute aid from USS Eolus and USS Fort Jackson, took the steamer Lady Sterling. Calypso was sent north with her prize 6 November, and after receiving repairs at New York City, returned late in spring 1865 to cruising from Chesapeake Bay to the coast of Florida.

== Post-war decommissioning and sale ==
She was decommissioned at the Washington Navy Yard 15 August 1865, and was sold at New York City 30 November 1865.
