= John O'Neal (Medal of Honor) =

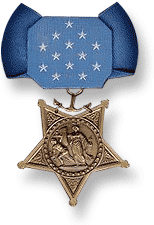
- Born: c. 1841; Ireland
- Military career
- Allegiance: United States of America
- Branch: United States Navy
- Rank: Boatswain's Mate
- Unit: USS Kansas
- Awards: Medal of Honor

John O'Neal (c. 1841—after 1872) was an Irish-born United States Navy sailor who received the Medal of Honor for heroism on April 12, 1872. He was stationed aboard the USS Kansas as a Boatswain's Mate when, on April 12, 1872, several members of the crew including the expedition commander were drowning near Greytown, Nicaragua.

The men who drowned were
Commander Alexander Foster Crosman, commanding expedition, his body not recovered
Master Alfred Foree, attached to the Kansas, his body not recovered
Cockswain William Walker, attached to the Kansas, his body not recovered
Ordinary Seaman Emil Birgfield, attached to the Kansas, his body not recovered
Ordinary Seaman William Arkwright, attached to the Kansas, his body not recovered
Ordinary Seaman James Eley, attached to the Kansas, his body recovered on April 13, 1872

== Medal of Honor citation ==
Serving on board the U.S.S. Kansas, O'Neal displayed great coolness and self-possession at the time Comdr. A. F. Crosman and others were drowned near Greytown, Nicaragua, 12 April 1872, and by personal exertion prevented greater loss of life.

== See also ==
- List of Medal of Honor recipients
