= James Smith (Medal of Honor, 1872) =

- Born: 1838; Hawaiian Kingdom
- Died: Unknown
- Military career
- Allegiance: United States
- Branch: United States Navy
- Rank: Seaman
- Unit: USS Kansas (1863)
- Awards: Medal of Honor

James Smith (born 1838) was a seaman serving in the United States Navy who received the Medal of Honor for bravery.

== Biography ==
Smith was born in 1838 in the Kingdom of Hawaii before it became part of the United States and after immigrating to the United States he joined the navy. He was stationed aboard the USS Kansas as a seaman when, on April 12, 1872, several members of the crew including the ship's captain were drowning near Greytown, Nicaragua. For his actions received the Medal of Honor July 9, 1872.

The men who drowned were
Commander Alexander Foster Crosman, commanding expedition, his body not recovered
Master Alfred Foree, attached to the Kansas, his body not recovered
Cockswain William Walker, attached to the Kansas, his body not recovered
Ordinary Seaman Emil Birgfield, attached to the Kansas, his body not recovered
Ordinary Seaman William Arkwright, attached to the Kansas, his body not recovered
Ordinary Seaman James Eley, attached to the Kansas, his body recovered on April 13, 1872

== Medal of Honor citation ==
Rank and organization: Seaman, U.S. Navy. Born: 1838, Hawaiian Islands. Accredited to: New York. G.O. No.: 176, 9 July 1872.

Citation:

Serving on board the U.S.S. Kansas, Smith displayed great coolness and self-possession at the time Comdr. A. F. Crosman and others were drowned near Greytown, Nicaragua, 12 April 1872, and by extraordinary heroism and personal exertion, prevented greater loss of life.

== See also ==
- List of Medal of Honor recipients during peacetime
