= John Johnson (Medal of Honor, 1839) =

- Navy Medal of Honor
- Born: c. 1839; Philadelphia, Pennsylvania, U.S.
- Military career
- Allegiance: United States of America
- Branch: United States Navy
- Rank: Seaman
- Unit: USS Kansas
- Awards: Medal of Honor

John Johnson (born c. 1839, date of death unknown) was a United States Navy sailor and a recipient of America's highest military decoration, the Medal of Honor.

== Biography ==
On April 12, 1872, Davis was serving as a seaman on the steamship USS Kansas near Greytown, Nicaragua, when an accident occurred. Several members of the crew including the expedition commander were drowning. For his actions on that day, Seaman Johnson was awarded the Medal of Honor three months later, on July 9, 1872.

The men who drowned were
Commander Alexander Foster Crosman, commanding expedition, his body not recovered
Master Alfred Foree, attached to the Kansas, his body not recovered
Cockswain William Walker, attached to the Kansas, his body not recovered
Ordinary Seaman Emil Birgfield, attached to the Kansas, his body not recovered
Ordinary Seaman William Arkwright, attached to the Kansas, his body not recovered
Ordinary Seaman James Eley, attached to the Kansas, his body recovered on April 13, 1872

== Medal of Honor citation ==
His official Medal of Honor citation reads:

Johnson displayed great coolness and self-possession at the time Comdr. A. F. Crosman and others were drowned and, by extraordinary heroism and personal exertion, prevented greater loss of life.

== See also ==
- List of Medal of Honor recipients during Peacetime
- List of African American Medal of Honor recipients
