= George Hill (Medal of Honor) =

US Navy sailor Medal of Honor recipient (born c. 1844)

- Navy Medal of Honor
- Born: c. 1844; Bristol, England
- Military career
- Allegiance: United States of America
- Branch: United States Navy
- Rank: Chief Quarter Gunner
- Unit: USS Kansas (1863)
- Awards: Medal of Honor

George Hill (born c. 1844) was a sailor serving in the United States Navy who received the Medal of Honor for bravery.

== Biography ==
Hill was born in about 1844 in England and after immigrating to the United States he joined the navy. He was stationed aboard the USS Kansas (1863) as chief quarter gunner when, on April 12, 1872, several members of the crew were drowning. For his actions received the Medal of Honor July 9, 1872.

The men who drowned were
Commander Alexander Foster Crosman, commanding expedition, his body not recovered
Master Alfred Foree, attached to the Kansas, his body not recovered
Cockswain William Walker, attached to the Kansas, his body not recovered
Ordinary Seaman Emil Birgfield, attached to the Kansas, his body not recovered
Ordinary Seaman William Arkwright, attached to the Kansas, his body not recovered
Ordinary Seaman James Eley, attached to the Kansas, his body recovered on April 13, 1872

== Medal of Honor citation ==
Rank and organization: Chief Quarter Gunner, U.S. Navy. Born: 1844, England. Entered service at: New York, N.Y. G.O. No.: 176, 9 July 1872.

Citation:

Serving on board the U.S.S. Kansas, Hill displayed great coolness and self-possession at the time Comdr. A. F. Crosman and others were drowned, near Greytown, Nicaragua, 12 April 1872, and by extraordinary heroism and personal exertion, prevented greater loss of life.

== See also ==
- List of Medal of Honor recipients in non-combat incidents
