= Richard Pile =

- Born: 1849; Barbados, West Indies
- Died: Unknown
- Military career
- Allegiance: United States of America
- Branch: United States Navy
- Rank: Ordinary Seaman
- Unit: USS Kansas (1863)
- Awards: Medal of Honor

Richard Pile (born 1849) was an seaman serving in the United States Navy who received the Medal of Honor for bravery.

== Biography ==
Richard T. Pile was born in 1849 on Barbados and, after emigrating to the United States, he joined the Navy in Boston, Massachusetts on November 26, 1870.

He was stationed aboard the USS Kansas (1863) as an ordinary seaman when, on April 12, 1872, several members of the crew were drowning. For his actions received the Medal of Honor March 20, 1905.

The men who drowned were
Commander Alexander Foster Crosman, commanding expedition, his body not recovered
Master Alfred Foree, attached to the Kansas, his body not recovered
Cockswain William Walker, attached to the Kansas, his body not recovered
Ordinary Seaman Emil Birgfield, attached to the Kansas, his body not recovered
Ordinary Seaman William Arkwright, attached to the Kansas, his body not recovered
Ordinary Seaman James Eley, attached to the Kansas, his body recovered on April 13, 1872

== Medal of Honor citation ==
Rank and organization: Ordinary Seaman, U.S. Navy. Born: 1849, West Indies. Accredited to: Massachusetts. G.O. No.: 176, 9 July 1872.

Citation:

Serving on board the U.S.S. Kansas, Pile displayed great coolness and self-possession at the time Comdr. A. F. Crosman and others were drowned, near Greytown, Nicaragua, 12 April 1872, and by his extraordinary heroism and personal exertion prevented greater loss of

== See also ==
- List of Medal of Honor recipients during peacetime
