= Clark Henry Wells =

United States Navy rear admiral (1822–1888)

- Born: September 22, 1822; Reading, Pennsylvania, U.S.
- Died: January 28, 1888 (aged 65); Washington, D.C., U.S.
- Burial place: Laurel Hill Cemetery
- Education: United States Naval Academy
- Military career
- Allegiance: United States
- Branch: United States Navy
- Rank: Rear admiral
- Commands: League Island Navy Yard; USS Shenandoah; USS Kansas; USS Galena; USS Dale
- Conflicts: Mexican–American War; American Civil War

Clark Henry Wells (September 22, 1822 – January 28, 1888) was a career officer in the United States Navy. He served in the American Civil War, as well as for two subsequent decades before retiring as a rear admiral.

== Early life and career ==
Wells was born in Reading, Pennsylvania, and attended school there. He was appointed as a midshipman in the Navy on September 25, 1840, and spent a year at the Mediterranean Station before serving at the Home Station from 1842 to 1843. For the next two years, Wells served in the Pacific Squadron. He attended the Naval Academy in Annapolis, Maryland, in 1846 and graduated from its Naval School. He became a Passed Midshipman on July 11, 1846.

Wells was assigned to duty during the Mexican–American War blockading Vera Cruz. He sailed around the world from 1848 until 1851. Returning to the United States, he married Mary S. Walsh on September 11, 1851. Wells received a promotion to Master Commandant in 1855, then was commissioned lieutenant in September of that year. In 1857, served on USS Niagara and was part of the first expedition to lay a transatlantic telegraph cable.

== Civil War ==
At the start of the American Civil War, Wells was suffering from exhaustion and exposure from this travels, coupled with depression from the recent death of his beloved brother-in-law, with whom he had sailed for twelve years. Consequently, he spent three months in the Pennsylvania Hospital for the Insane in Philadelphia where he was diagnosed as having Melancholia, being released on October 11, 1861, to return to active duty. He was appointed executive officer of the USS Susquehanna and took part in the capture of Port Royal, South Carolina, on November 7, 1861. He then served on the sloop-of-war USS Vandalia before commanding the sloop-of-war USS Dale.

He was promoted to lieutenant commander on July 16, 1862, then became the executive officer of the Philadelphia Navy Yard in early 1863. During this time he sent a letter to the United States Secretary of War, Edwin M. Stanton, that accused Maj. Granville O. Haller, former commander of George B. McClellan's headquarters guard, of sentiments disloyal to the Union. Haller spent years fighting the unwarranted charge, and was eventually reinstated.

After his tour of duty at Philadelphia, Wells obtained command of the USS Galena in 1864 and joined the West Gulf Squadron. He participated in the Battle of Mobile Bay under Admiral David G. Farragut. Later that year, he was transferred to the East Gulf Squadron and served the rest of the war under David Dixon Porter on the James River.

== Post-bellum career ==
Following the war, Wells commanded the gunboat USS Kansas with the South Atlantic Squadron, until 1866. He was promoted to commander on July 25, 1866. Wells commanded the screw sloop USS Shenandoah from 1870 to 1874. He was promoted to captain on June 19, 1871. Wells served as executive officer at the Boston Navy Yard in 1874, captain of the yard at the old Philadelphia Navy Yard from 1874 to 1876 and commandant of the new League Island Navy Yard from 1876 to 1877. He was Chief Signal Officer of the Navy in 1879–80. Wells received a promotion to commodore on January 22, 1880, and to rear admiral on August 1, 1884. He was placed on the retired list September 22, 1884.

Wells died at his residence in Washington, D.C., from heart disease, and was buried in Philadelphia's Laurel Hill Cemetery, Section M, Lot 22.
