= USS Britannia =

Gunboat of the United States Navy

History

United States
- Namesake: Britannia
- Laid down: date unknown
- Launched: 1862
- Acquired: 29 September 1863
- Commissioned: 16 September 1863
- Decommissioned: 28 June 1865
- Stricken: 1865 (est.)
- Captured: by Union Navy forces; 25 June 1863
- Fate: Sold, 10 August 1865

General characteristics
- Displacement: 495 tons
- Length: 189 ft (58 m)
- Beam: 26 ft (7.9 m)
- Draft: 9 ft (2.7 m)
- Depth of hold: 11 ft (3.4 m)
- Propulsion: steam engine; side wheel-propelled
- Speed: 12.5 knots
- Complement: 75
- Armament: one 30-pounder Parrott rifle; twelve 12-pounder rifles; two 24-pounder howitzers
- Armour: iron hulled

USS Britannia was a steamer captured by the Union Navy during the American Civil War. She was used by the Union Navy as a gunboat and patrol vessel in support of the Union Navy blockade of Confederate waterways.

In 1862, Barclay, Curle & Co. Ltd., Glasgow, shipbuilders launched the iron-hulled, side-wheel paddle steamer Britannia. She was first registered to the Leith, Hull & Hamburg company of Leith, Scotland. In January 1863, she was acquired by Leach, Harrison & Forward of Liverpool to run through the Union Navy's blockade of the Confederate coast during the American Civil War.

After three successful voyages carrying munitions and supplies to the beleaguered South, Britannia departed Charleston, South Carolina, on 21 June 1863 and headed for Nassau, New Providence, with a cargo of cotton.

== Captured by Santiago de Cuba ==
About dawn on the 25th, USS Santiago de Cuba sighted the blockade runner some 90 miles east northeast of Eleuthera Island. Britannia attempted to escape; but, at the end of a day-long chase "against a strong wind and sea" in which the Union sidewheel steamer slowly gained on the fleeing ship, Santiago de Cuba, about 7:00 p.m., finally was close enough to open fire. Her shells fell close around their target and quickly brought Britannia to. Commander Robert H. Wyman, the captain of Santiago de Cuba, placed a prize crew under Acting Master Edgar C. Merriman on board Britannia and sent her to Boston, Massachusetts.

She was condemned by the admiralty court there and sold to the United States Navy on 29 September 1863. However, almost a fortnight before, the Navy—anticipating the completion of this transaction—had placed Britannia in commission on 16 September 1863 at the Boston Navy Yard, Acting Master Hugh H. Savage in command.

== Assigned to the Union Blockade of the Confederacy ==
Assigned to the North Atlantic Blockading Squadron, she sailed soon thereafter for waters off Wilmington, North Carolina, but experienced disabling boiler trouble en route and was towed into Beaufort, North Carolina, on 26 September for temporary repairs. Then, following permanent repairs at the Norfolk Navy Yard, she left Hampton Roads, Virginia, late in November and finally took station off New Inlet, North Carolina, in the blockade of Wilmington, North Carolina.

=== Britannia hits blockade runner, but the ship escapes ===
Her first action came in the predawn darkness of 10 December when she fired upon an incoming blockade runner. Britannia's commanding officer was confident of having scored several hits, but the speedy steamer reached safety at Wilmington nonetheless.

=== Participating in the Bogue Inlet expedition ===
Britannia was somewhat more successful in her next major action early in the spring of 1864. On 24 March, she departed Beaufort to launch a closely coordinated Army-Navy expedition. She carried some 200 soldiers commanded by Col. James Jourdan and about 50 sailors from Union warships USS Keystone State, USS Florida, and USS Cambridge under Comdr. Benjamin M. Dove.

The aim of the expedition was to capture or to destroy two blockade running schooners reported to be lying to at Swansboro, North Carolina, and to capture the Confederate troops on the south end of Bogue Island Banks. Arriving off Bogue Inlet late at night, the expedition encountered high winds and heavy seas which prevented landing on the beach. Early on the morning of the 25th, a second attempt was made under similarly difficult conditions. Nevertheless, a party got through to Bear Creek and burned one of the schooners. Bad weather persisted throughout the day and the expedition eventually returned to Beaufort on the 26th with its mission only partially completed.

=== Rescuing the Swallow ===
On the morning of 8 April, Britannia steamed within range of Confederate coastal batteries to take under tow a small sailing ship which seemed to be drifting helplessly toward the Southern shore. The vessel proved to be the Swallow, a sloop which had been captured by Union side-wheeler USS Tioga off Elbow Cay Light in the Bahamas on 20 March. She had departed Abaco 19 days before under a prize crew, but had lost her sails in a gale, and was leaking seriously. Her commander was planning "...to run her ashore as the only means of saving himself and (his) crew."

=== Britannia attacked by CSS Raleigh ===
The next noteworthy event in Britannia's career occurred about a month later. On the evening of 6 May, Flag Officer William Francis Lynch, CSN—in the Southern ironclad steam sloop Raleigh—led a small naval force out of the Cape Fear River and over the bar at New Inlet. After crossing that barrier, Lynch headed straight for Britannia which promptly sent up several rockets to warn her sister blockaders of the impending attack and fired her 30-pounder Parrott rifle at Raleigh. Nevertheless, Britannia, badly overmatched, headed out to sea in an effort to escape.

Eager for action, the determined Southerner continued her advance toward the fleeing blockader; but her consorts, the steam gunboat Equator and the tug Yadkin turned back. As Britannia retreated, she fired at Raleigh with her 24-pounder howitzer. Meanwhile, the Southerner had opened fire and put out the blockader's binnacle lights with her first shot and came close to scoring again with subsequent rounds.

=== Rescued by Nansemond ===
Britannia frantically changed course several times before escaping in the darkness after the Union side-wheeler USS Nansemond captured her pursuer's attention. Raleigh and Nansemond exchanged salvos, and Britannia heard the roar of cannon from time to time during the night. At dawn, she saw Raleigh fighting off several other Northern warships as she retired toward the Cape Fear River. The Confederate ironclad ran aground while attempting to get over the bar off New Inlet and had to be destroyed.

=== Chasing CSS Tallahassee ===
From time to time during the last year of the Civil War, Britannia chased ships which were attempting either to slip into, or to escape from, Wilmington, North Carolina. The most memorable of these actions occurred on the night of 25 August after she had been alerted by warning rockets from other Union blockaders which had just seen CSS Tallahassee—commanded by Comdr. John Taylor Wood, CSN, the swashbuckling grandson of President of the United States, Zachary Taylor—as that Confederate cruiser was returning from one of the South's most successful commerce raiding cruises and was attempting to slip through the blockade to safety in Wilmington.

A bit under an hour after Britannia had gone to general quarters, she "...saw a stranger on our port quarter running alongshore." The Union warship "...put the helm hard aport and went ahead fast, and fired as soon as the guns would bear. Continued firing and chasing until she (Tallahassee) was close under Fort Fisher, in white water, the breakers being between us and her."

Tallahassee, joined by Southern batteries emplaced on the Mound, fired back at Britannia; and shrapnel from one shell which burst close aboard caused some damage to the Union blockader. Britannia's captain, Acting Volunteer Lieutenant Samuel Huse, reported that he felt "...confident that two of Britannia's shells took effect..." on Tallahassee. Still, the Confederate warship managed to dash by Britannia—the last blockader between her and the bar—and safely reached Wilmington.

=== Shelling the steamer Ella ===
Early in December, Britannia took part in the shelling of the steamer Ella which other Northern steamers had run aground on the shoals near the light at Bald Head Point on Smith's Island while that blockade runner was approaching the Western Bar Channel of the Cape Fear River.

=== Attack on Fort Fisher ===
Soon thereafter, Britannia began preparations to take part in a joint Army-Navy expedition against Fort Fisher which Confederate forces had erected to control the New Inlet entrance to the Cape Fear River. The ultimate objective of the project was the closing of Wilmington, the Confederacy's only major blockade running port still open.

==== First day ====
The Union task force—commanded by Rear Admiral David Dixon Porter—was delayed by bad weather, but launched its attack on the morning of 24 December 1864, following the detonation of the Union powder boat Louisiana. Transports carrying the Army troops had retired to Beaufort in order to avoid the anticipated effects of the explosion, and fleet units had assembled in a rendezvous area 12 miles from the fort.

At daylight on 24 December, the huge fleet got underway, formed in line of battle before the formidable Confederate works, and commenced a furious bombardment. The staunch Southern defenders, under the command of the Col. William Lamb, were driven from their guns and into the bombproofs of Fort Fisher, but managed to return the Federal fire from a few of their heavy cannon. Transports carrying the Union soldiers did not arrive from Beaufort until evening, too late for an assault that day. Accordingly, Porter withdrew his ships, intending to renew the attack the next day.

==== Second day ====
At 10:30 the following morning, Christmas, the ships again opened fire on the fort and maintained the bombardment while troops landed north of the works, near Flag Pond Battery. Naval gunfire kept the garrison largely pinned down and away from their guns as about 2,000 men landed and advanced toward the land face of the fort. Late in the afternoon, Union Army skirmishers supported by heavy fire from Union vessels, advanced to within yards of the fort. Union Army commanders, however, considered the works too strongly defended to be carried by assault with the troops available, and the soldiers began to re-embark. Naval gunfire protected some 700 troops who were left on the beaches as the weather worsened. By 27 December the last troops were reembarked.

==== Attack fails, Union forces withdraw ====
The first major attack on Fort Fisher had failed. Confederate reinforcements under General R. F. Hoke were in Wilmington and arrived at Confederate Point just after Union forces departed. The Army transports returned to Hampton Roads to prepare for a second move on the Confederate bastion, while Porter's fleet, including Britannia, remained in the Wilmington-Beaufort area and continued sporadic bombardment in an effort to prevent repair of the fort.

==== Union forces return and Fort Fisher capitulates ====
Britannia was a part of the new and more powerful Union task force which attacked Fort Fisher early on the morning of 13 January 1865. After taking part in the prelanding bombardment, she lowered her boats to carry troops to the peninsula on which the Confederate fort had been built. Then, once the assault teams were on the sandy beaches, she intermittently shelled the Confederate works during the bloody three-day struggle which culminated with the surrender of the gallant, but beleaguered, Southern garrison on the evening of the 15th.

For a bit more than a fortnight thereafter, the side-wheel steamer busied herself with cleanup operations in the Cape Fear River. Her assignments included holding and transporting prisoners who had been captured at the Confederate surrender.

=== Reassigned to the East Gulf Blockade ===
On the last day of January, orders detached Britannia from Porter's fleet and sent her to Florida waters for duty in the East Gulf Blockading Squadron. She reached Key West, Florida, in mid-February and, about a week later, left that port with a joint Army-Navy force which had been assembled to attack Fort Ward, up the St Marks River. The South was attempting to strengthen so that it might be, in the words of the squadron commander, Acting Rear Admiral Cornelius K. Stribling,

...in some sort a compensation for the loss of Wilmington.

The shallow water of the river prevented the Union warships from ascending the St. Marks River high enough to attack the fort. Britannia managed by great effort to get higher than most of her consorts, but a report that the Army was retreating prompted the naval force to begin to withdraw on 7 March. The "Britannia, Malauska, and Spiren" all ran aground in the river. However, some Union ships remained at the mouth of the river to prevent the South from using St. Marks as a port of entry. Moreover, the expedition managed to destroy extensive salt works in the vicinity.

Britannia served in Florida waters through the Confederate collapse and sailed north in mid-June.

== Post-war civilian career ==
She was decommissioned at Philadelphia, Pennsylvania, on 28 June 1865 and sold at auction there on 10 August 1865. Documented as SS Britannia on 8 September 1865, the steamer served under the American flag as a merchantman until sold abroad in 1886.

== See also ==
- Ships captured in the American Civil War
- Blockade runners of the American Civil War
- Bibliography of American Civil War naval history
- Union Navy
- Confederate States Navy
