= Austin Denham =

United States Medal of Honor recipient

- Born: September 29, 1850; England
- Died: June 3, 1948 (aged 97); Burbank, California, US
- Military career
- Allegiance: United States
- Branch: United States Navy
- Service years: c. 1864–1912
- Rank: Seaman First Class
- Unit: USS Kansas
- Awards: Medal of Honor

Austin Denham (September 29, 1850 – June 3, 1948) was a United States Navy sailor and a recipient of the United States military's highest decoration, the Medal of Honor.

== Biography ==
Born on September 29, 1850, in England, Denham immigrated to the United States at age 12. He lived in New York City and enlisted in the Navy as soon as he was old enough. By April 12, 1872, he was serving as a seaman on the USS Kansas. On that day, he helped rescue several men who were in danger of drowning after their boat capsized in heavy surf. For this action, he was awarded the Medal of Honor three months later, on July 9, 1872.

The men who drowned were
Commander Alexander Foster Crosman, commanding expedition, his body not recovered
Master Alfred Foree, attached to the Kansas, his body not recovered
Cockswain William Walker, attached to the Kansas, his body not recovered
Ordinary Seaman Emil Birgfield, attached to the Kansas, his body not recovered
Ordinary Seaman William Arkwright, attached to the Kansas, his body not recovered
Ordinary Seaman James Eley, attached to the Kansas, his body recovered on April 13, 1872

Denham's official Medal of Honor citation reads:

On board the U.S.S. Kansas near Greytown, Nicaragua, 12 April 1872. Displaying great coolness and self-possession at the time Comdr. A. F. Crosman and others were drowned, Denham, by heroism and personal exertion, prevented greater loss of life.

Denham retired from the Navy in 1912 as a seaman first class, after a 48-year career. He died in Burbank, California, on June 3, 1948, of a heart attack. Aged 97 at his death, he was the oldest living Medal of Honor recipient at the time.

== See also ==
- List of Medal of Honor recipients during peacetime
