= USS Niphon =

Gunboat of the United States Navy

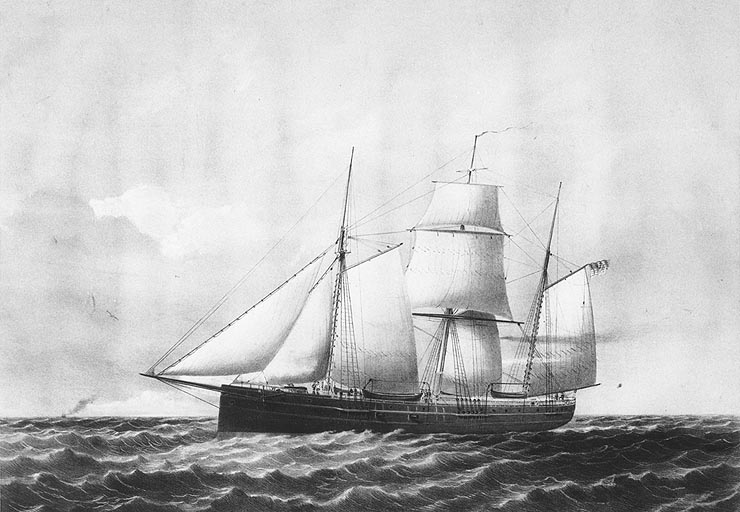

History

United States
- Name: USS Niphon
- Laid down: Date unknown
- Launched: February 1863
- Acquired: 22 April 1863
- Commissioned: 24 April 1863
- Decommissioned: 1 December 1864
- Stricken: 1865 (est.)
- Fate: Sold, 17 April 1865

General characteristics
- Displacement: 475 long tons (483 t)
- Length: 153 ft 2 in (46.69 m)
- Beam: 24 ft 9 in (7.54 m)
- Draft: 11 ft 3 in (3.43 m)
- Depth of hold: 17 ft 3 in (5.26 m)
- Propulsion: steam engine, screw
- Speed: 12.5 knots (23.2 km/h; 14.4 mph)
- Complement: 70
- Armament: 1 × 20-pounder Parrott rifle; 2 × 12-pounder rifles; 4 × 32-pounder guns
- Armor: Wood and iron

USS Niphon was a steam operated vessel acquired by the Union Navy during the American Civil War. She was used by the Navy to patrol navigable waterways of the Confederacy to prevent the South from trading with other countries.

Niphon, a wooden and iron screw steamer launched at Boston, Massachusetts, in February 1863, delivered to the Navy at Boston on 22 April 1863; and commissioned at Boston Navy Yard on 24 April 1863, Acting Ensign Joseph B. Breck in command; and was formally purchased 9 May 1863.

== Assigned to the North Atlantic Blockade ==
Assigned to the North Atlantic Blockading Squadron, Niphon was first stationed off Fort Fisher, North Carolina, which protected Wilmington, North Carolina, from attack by sea. She captured the blockade runner Banshee at New Inlet, North Carolina on 29 July 1863. On 18 August she chased the steamer Hebe, carrying drugs, clothing, coffee, and provisions for the Confederacy, and forced the blockade runner aground north of Fort Fisher where she was abandoned. The boats from Niphon were sent to destroy Hebe, but were swamped in heavy seas and their crews captured. Then USS Shokoken opened fire on Hebe and she was burned to the waterline.

== Niphon captures the large blockade runner Ella and Annie ==
With USS James Adger, Niphon captured the steamer Cornubia north of New Inlet on 8 November. Cornubia’s papers exposed the whole scheme by which the Confederacy had clandestinely obtained ships in England. The next day Niphon captured the blockade runner Ella and Annie off Masonboro Inlet, North Carolina, attempting to slip in with a cargo of arms and provisions. Trying to escape, the runner rammed Niphon but surrendered to Federal bluejackets who boarded her when the ships had swung broadside. Ella and Annie was later commissioned in the Union Navy as USS Malvern.

After capturing Ella and Annie, Niphon returned to Boston for repairs, but was back off New Inlet on 6 February 1864. On 21 April, Niphon, USS Howquah, and USS Fort Jackson destroyed the salt works at Masonboro Sound, North Carolina. On 27 August, Niphon and USS Monticello ventured up Masonboro Inlet to silence a Confederate battery. Landing parties from the ships captured arms, ammunition, and food stuffs. A boat expedition from Niphon landed at Masonboro Inlet on 19 September to gain intelligence on the defenses of Wilmington, North Carolina. They learned that raider CSS Tallahassee and several blockade runners were at Wilmington. That day Acting Master Edmund Kemble relieved Breck in command.

== Attacking blockade runners ==
On 25 September, Niphon, Howquah, and USS Governor Buckingham, in an engagement with blockade runner Lynx and Confederate shore batteries, chased the blazing steamer ashore where she burned until consumed.

Late on the night of 29 September, Niphon fired upon Night Hawk as she attempted to run into New Inlet, and observed her go aground. A boat crew led by Acting Ensign Semon boarded the steamer and, under fire from Fort Fisher, set her ablaze and brought off the crew as prisoners.

== Mrs. Rose O’Neal Greenhow drowns with a bag of gold around her neck ==
Niphon ran the British blockade runner Condor aground off New Inlet on 1 October, but was prevented from destroying the steamer by intense fire from Fort Fisher. Among the passengers on board Condor was one of the most famous Confederate agents of the war, Mrs. Rose O'Neal Greenhow who, fearful of being captured with her important dispatches, set out in a boat for shore. Her craft overturned in the heavy surf. The crew managed to get ashore; but the lady, weighted down by $2,000 in Confederate gold in a pouch around her neck, drowned.

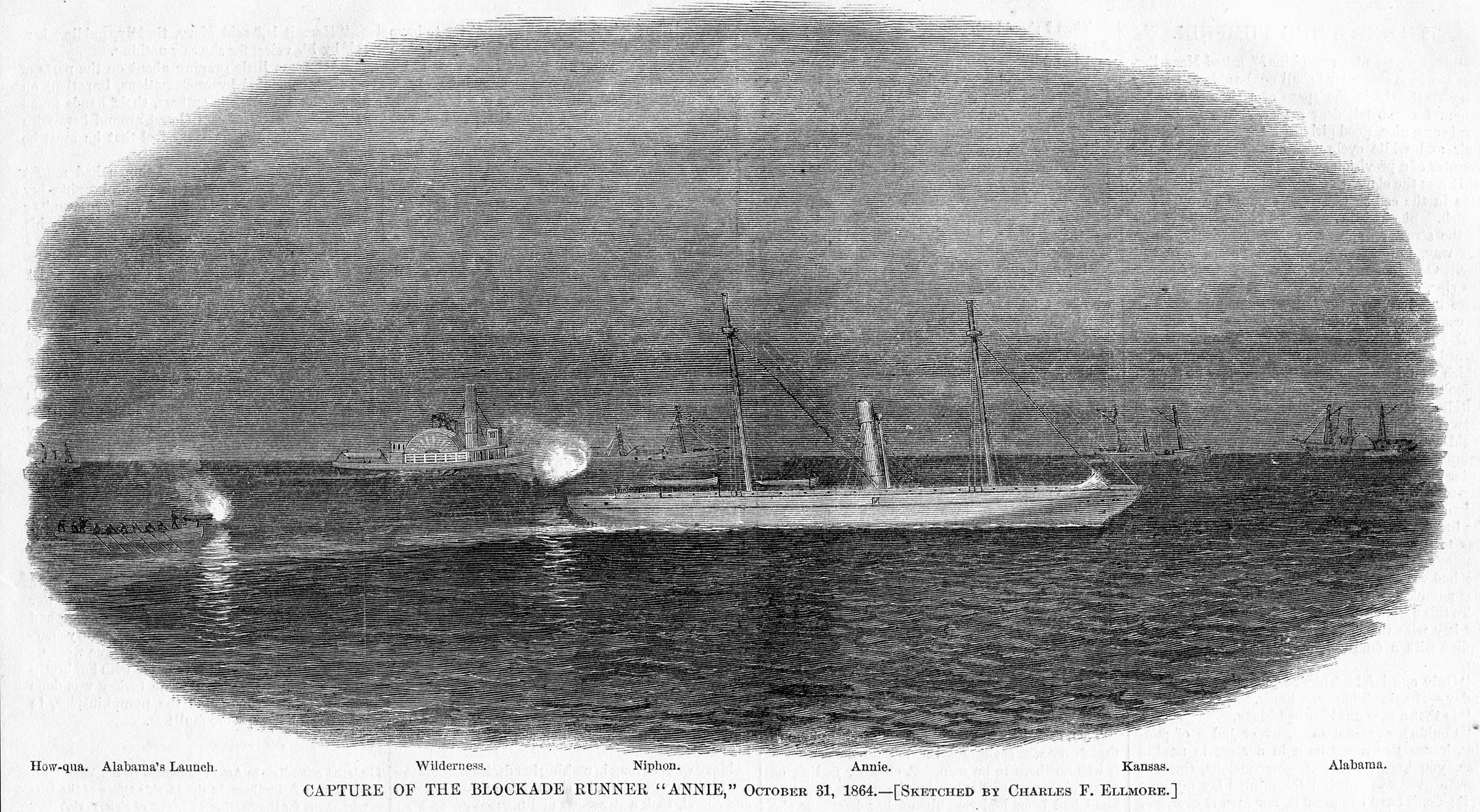
USS Niphon and USS Wilderness captures the rebel blockade runner Annie.

== Niphon, under fire, saves a stranded Berberry ==
On the 7th, the Union blockader USS Aster chased the blockade runner Annie ashore at New Inlet, under the guns of Fort Fisher, but the 285-ton Federal wooden steamer ran aground herself and was destroyed to prevent capture. Niphon rescued Aster’s crew under a hail of fire from Confederate batteries and towed out USS Berberry, after the Northern steamer had become disabled trying to pull Aster off the shoal.

On the last day of October, USS Wilderness and Niphon seized another blockade runner named Annie off New Inlet, North Carolina. She was a British steamer with cargo of tobacco, cotton, and turpentine.

== End-of-war decommissioning and sale ==
Late in November Niphon, in need of extensive repairs, steamed to Boston where she was decommissioned on 1 December. She was sold at public auction there on 17 April 1865, and was documented as Tejuca on 23 October 1865 and was sold abroad in 1867.
