= Battle of Wilmington order of battle: Confederate =

The following units and commanders fought in the Battle of Wilmington (February 11 to 22, 1865) of the American Civil War. The Union order of battle is listed separately.

== Abbreviations used ==
=== Military rank ===
- Gen = General
- MG = Major General
- BG = Brigadier General
- Col = Colonel
- Ltc = Lieutenant Colonel
- Maj = Major
- Cpt = Captain
- Lt = 1st Lieutenant

== Confederate Department of North Carolina ==
District of Cape Fear
Gen Braxton Bragg

=== Post of Sugar Loaf ===
Division	Brigade	Regiments and Others
Hoke's Division; MG Robert F. Hoke	Clingman's Brigade Col William S. Devane	8th North Carolina: Ltc Rufus A. Barrier; 31st North Carolina: Ltc Charles W. Knight; 51st North Carolina: Cpt James W. Lippit; 61st North Carolina
Hoke's Division; MG Robert F. Hoke	Colquitt's Brigade Col Charles T. Zachary	6th Georgia: Ltc Sampson W. Harris; 19th Georgia: Col James H. Neal; 23rd Georgia: Col Marcus R. Ballenger; 27th Georgia: Cpt Elisha D. Graham; 28th Georgia: Cpt John A. Johnson
Hoke's Division; MG Robert F. Hoke	Kirkland's Brigade BG William W. Kirkland	17th North Carolina: Ltc Thomas H. Sharp; 42nd North Carolina: Col John E. Brown; 66th North Carolina: Col John E. Nethercutt
Hoke's Division; MG Robert F. Hoke	Artillery	3rd Battalion North Carolina Light Artillery; Company A (Northhampton Artillery): Cpt Andrew J. Ellis; Company C (detachment): Lt Alfred M. Darden; 1st North Carolina Light Artillery; 2nd Company I (Southerland's Battery): Cpt Thomas J. Southerland; Staunton Hill Battery (Paris' Battery): Cpt Andrew B. Paris
Hoke's Division; MG Robert F. Hoke	Cavalry	2nd South Carolina Cavalry (detachment): Col Thomas J. Lipscomb

=== Fort Anderson ===
Division	Brigade	Regiments and Others
Garrison	Hagood's Brigade BG Johnson Hagood	11th South Carolina: Col F. Hay Gantt; 21st South Carolina (remnants): Col Robert F. Graham; 25th South Carolina (remnants): Col Charles H. Simonton; 27th South Carolina: Cpt Allston; 7th South Carolina Battalion: Ltc James H. Rion
Garrison	Artillery	3rd Battalion North Carolina Light Artillery; Company B: Cpt William Badham, Jr.; Sampson Artillery: Cpt Abner A. Mosely
Garrison	Hedrick's Brigade Col John J. Hedrick	2nd North Carolina Artillery (remnants): Ltc John Douglas Taylor; 3rd North Carolina Artillery: Maj William Holland; Company A (Lenoir Braves): Cpt Ancram W. Ezzell; Company B (McMillan Artillery): Lt Macon Bonner, Lt Selby Harden; Company C (Bridger's Artillery): Cpt John E. Leggett; Company F: Cpt John Robertson; 2nd Company H (Barnes' Battery): Cpt Calvin Barnes; Company I: Cpt Charles C. Whitehurst; 1st Battalion North Carolina Heavy Artillery; Company A (Clark Artillery): Cpt Robert G. Rankin; Company B (River Guards): Cpt John W. Taylor; Company C (Brown's Battalion): Cpt William H. Brown; Company D (remnants): Lt John T. Rankin; 2nd North Carolina Junior Reserves, Company B; McDougald's Unattached Company North Carolina Troops: Cpt W. J. McDougald; Coast Guard Company (unattached)

=== Post of Wilmington ===
Col George Jackson

Division	Brigade	Regiments and Others
Post garrison	Armory Guards, Company B: Cpt Armand L deRosset; 7th North Carolina Home Guards, Companies A and B: Col James G. Burr; 8th North Carolina Senior Reserves: Col Allmand M. McKoy	
Post garrison	Engineers	2nd Engineers, Company A: Cpt John C. Winder; Signal Corps: Lt George C. Bain
Post garrison	Cape Fear River batteries Col Peter C. Gaillard	13th Battalion North Carolina Light/Heavy Artillery; Company D (Adams' Battery): Lt Samuel H. Forbes; 68th North Carolina Troops, Company C (detachment); McDougald's Company (detachment)

== Sources ==
- Fonvielle, Jr., Chris E. The Wilmington Campaign: Last Rays of Departing Hope. Campbell, California: Savas Publishing Company, 1997. ISBN 1-882810-09-0
