= USS Berberry =

Tugboat of the United States Navy

History

United States
- Name: USS Berberry
- Ordered: as Columbia
- Laid down: 1864
- Launched: 1864
- Acquired: August 13, 1864
- Commissioned: September 12, 1864
- Decommissioned: June 10, 1865
- Stricken: 1865 (est.)
- Fate: Sold, July 12, 1865

General characteristics
- Type: Tugboat
- Displacement: 163 long tons (166 t)
- Length: 99 ft (30 m)
- Beam: 20 ft (6.1 m)
- Draft: 8 ft 6 in (2.59 m)
- Depth of hold: 9 ft (2.7 m)
- Propulsion: Steam engine, screw
- Speed: 10 kn (12 mph; 19 km/h)
- Complement: 35
- Armament: 2 × heavy 12-pounder smoothbore guns, 2 × 24-pounder smoothbore guns

USS Berberry was a steam-powered tugboat acquired by the Union Navy during the American Civil War. She was used by the Navy to patrol navigable waterways of the Confederacy to prevent the South from trading with other countries.

On August 13, 1864, at Philadelphia, Pennsylvania, the Navy purchased Columbia, a wooden-hulled screw steamer built there earlier that year. The Navy renamed her Berberry, and she was placed in commission at the Philadelphia Navy Yard on September 12, 1864, Acting Ensign Milton Griffith in command.

== Assigned to the North Atlantic Blockade ==
After about a fortnight’s towing duty that took her to Fort Monroe and Baltimore, Maryland, Berberry departed Philadelphia on September 29 and reached Beaufort, North Carolina, on October 1 for duty in the North Atlantic Blockading Squadron. Two days later, she took station off the New Inlet entrance to North Carolina’s Cape Fear River where she labored to help tighten the blockade of Wilmington, North Carolina.

== Chasing after blockade runners in the dark of night ==
At 03:00 on the morning of October 4, while patrolling east of Mount Light, the tug observed a steamer heading for New Inlet and gave chase. Although she fired two shots at the stranger, that blockade runner managed to cross Berberry's bow and escaped into New Inlet. At 21:45 on the following evening, a lookout in the tug sighted a long, low, two stack steamer standing out to sea from New Inlet. Later that night, Griffith reported that the blockade runner "...stood for us within 400 yards; then kept off to the southward." Berberry immediately attempted to cut off the steamer by getting between her and the bar. Meanwhile, she opened fire on the stranger and sent up "...rockets in the direction in which she was steering." Despite the fact that fellow blockaders Niphon and Daylight joined the chase, the runner's speed enabled her to steam out of sight of her pursuers; and she apparently made her way safely to the open sea.

== Attempting to free run-aground Aster, Berberry gets stuck ==
Shortly after midnight on October 8, while Berberry was on station northeast of Mound Light, observers reported an approaching boat. Griffith hailed the stranger and ordered her alongside. She proved to be from the tug Aster — that had run aground on Caroline Shoals while chasing a blockade runner that was attempting to enter New Inlet — and requested assistance.

Berberry quickly set a course for New Inlet Bar where she took a hawser from Aster and attempted to pull the stranded tug free. However, the hawser parted without Aster's budging; and Berberry made several more unsuccessful attempts before the falling tide compelled her to abandon the effort. She then tried to go alongside Aster so that she might rescue the tug's crew. It took Berberry some 20 minutes of difficult maneuvering to work into a position suitable for the transfer. She then took on board everyone from Aster with the exception of that vessel's captain, executive officer, and pilot who all remained behind to destroy their ship lest she fall into enemy hands. During the operation, Berberry thumped "...heavily on the bottom...."

Then, as she moved away from Aster, Berberry ran over the hawser that became entangled with her propeller. Griffith then had his men raise all the awnings, blankets, and other large pieces of cloth as jury-rigged "...sails to drift the Berberry off shore." Meanwhile, he burned Coston signal lights to call for help.

== Niphon comes to the rescue of Berberry while Aster burns ==
When he saw Berberry's signal, Niphon's commanding officer was preparing to launch boats to board and to destroy the stranded blockade running steamer Annie that Aster had been chasing. He immediately abandoned that project and headed for Berberry to render aid. About this time, Aster burst into flame, illuminating both Berberry and Niphon and enabling Confederate shore batteries to open fire on both Union ships. Despite the heavy barrage, Niphon pressed on with her rescue operations and pulled Berberry to safety. Unfortunately, the tug was leaking badly from striking the bottom and required repairs at the Norfolk Navy Yard.

== Continued North Carolina operations ==
Ready to resume action late in November, Berberry departed Hampton Roads on the 23rd and headed back to waters off New Inlet. She arrived there on the morning of the 26th and, that night, her guns persuaded an unidentified blockade runner to give up her attempt to escape to sea and to retire to Wilmington, North Carolina.

Early in December, illness compelled Ens. Griffith to request relief and Ens. Robert W. Browntree took command of the tug on December 4. On the 10th, a severe storm battered the tug and forced her to return to Beaufort for repairs.

Mid-month found Berberry still at Beaufort in the Sounds of North Carolina, and she served there through the end of the year. On January 3, 1865, Acting Ens. Peter C. Asserson took command of the tug that then returned to blockade duty off New Inlet. She operated there until February 26. She then returned to Beaufort and operated in the sounds until after the collapse of the Confederacy. The tug left North Carolina's inland waters on 29 May and reached Hampton Roads the next day.

== Post-war decommissioning and sale ==
She sailed north on June 1 and reached New York on the 2nd. Berberry was decommissioned at the New York Navy Yard on June 10. Sold at public auction there on July 12, she was redocumented as Rescue on July 31. The tug served through the turn of the century and was sold to a foreign purchaser in 1902.
