= CSS North Carolina =

Ironclad gunboat built by the Confederate States Navy in 1863

Coordinates: 33°54′49″N 78°1′8″W

History

Confederate States
- Name: North Carolina
- Ordered: 1863
- Laid down: 1863
- Launched: October 1863
- Commissioned: December 1863
- Decommissioned: 27 September 1864
- Fate: Sank 27 September 1864

General characteristics
- Displacement: 600 tons
- Length: 150 ft (46 m)
- Beam: 32 ft (9.8 m)
- Draft: 12 ft (3.7 m)
- Propulsion: Steam engine
- Complement: 150 officers and enlisted men
- Armament: six 8-inch cannon, one pivot rifle

CSS North Carolina was a casemate ironclad built for the Confederate Navy in 1863 during the American Civil War by Berry & Brothers at Wilmington, North Carolina at a cost of $76,000. She was placed in commission during the latter part of the year with Commander W. T. Muse, CSN, in command.

The ironclad's bulkheads above the waterline were sloped inward at a 30-degree angle and were armored with four inches of railroad iron, similar to the armor used on CSS Virginia II. There were two shuttered gun ports on each of her four casemate sides, and she carried six 8-inch cannons that could be rolled on their carriages from one port to another; she mounted one heavy pivot-rifle in the bow cannon position.

North Carolina was discovered to be structurally unsound and unsuitable for use on the open ocean; her hull had become riddled with shipworm as a result of the green hull timber used for her construction. She remained in the Cape Fear River, where she had developed bad leaks, until she finally foundered on 27 September 1864, just off Smithville (modern Southport); she was serving there as a guard ship.

Her sister ship CSS Raleigh was also a hard-luck ironclad. After serving in the Confederate Navy for just one week, Raleigh ran heavily aground on a sandbar called "the Rip." Her tonnage bore down heavily on the ship's unsupported aft keel, the pressure finally "breaking her back," as the tide receded; the ironclad was declared a total loss and her cannon, iron armor, and steam power plant were salvaged.
