= USS Vicksburg (1863) =

Gunboat of the United States Navy

History

United States
- Name: USS Vicksburg
- Acquired: by purchase, 20 October 1863
- Commissioned: 2 December 1863
- Decommissioned: 29 April 1865
- Fate: Sold for merchant service, 12 July 1865

General characteristics
- Type: Steamship
- Displacement: 886 long tons (900 t)
- Length: 185 ft (56 m)
- Beam: 33 ft (10 m)
- Draft: 14 ft (4.3 m)
- Propulsion: Steam engine
- Speed: 9 knots (17 km/h; 10 mph)
- Complement: 66 officers and enlisted
- Armament: 1 × 100-pounder Parrott rifle; 4 × 30-pounder Parrott rifles; 1 × 20-pounder Parrott rifle; 1 × 20-pounder smoothbore

USS Vicksburg was a wooden steamship built in 1863 at Mystic, Connecticut; purchased by the United States Navy at New York City on 20 October 1863; converted into a gunboat; and commissioned at the New York Navy Yard on 2 December, Lieutenant Commander L. Braine in command. Vicksburg was named in honor of the great victory that General Ulysses S. Grant had recently won at Vicksburg, Mississippi.

== Service history ==
On 7 December, a group of 17 Confederate sympathizers masquerading as passengers seized the steamer Chesapeake off Cape Cod, Massachusetts. The panic caused by that daring Confederate exploit prompted the Navy to order Vicksburg on 21 December to take up station off Sandy Hook, N.J., and detain for inspection all commercial ships outbound from New York. She performed similar duty off Staten Island, N.Y., through January 1864 until she was finally relieved on 8 February and ordered to sail for Hampton Roads, Va., for duty with the North Atlantic Blockading Squadron.

Vicksburg put into Hampton Roads two days later and was deployed with the blockade off Wilmington, North Carolina, on 18 February. In the spring, while on temporary duty off the coast of South Carolina, the gunboat seized the blockade-running British schooner Indian east of Charleston on 30 April. Returning to North Carolina, Vicksburg towed the stricken mortar schooner Oliver H. Lee to Beaufort, N.C., on 17 May and 18 May and chased a blockade runner on 31 May, recovering 79 bales of cotton thrown overboard by the vessel's crew. The gunboat put into Hampton Roads for repairs in June.

On 11 July, Vicksburg received orders north to Annapolis, Maryland, to help protect Union emplacements there from Confederate raiders. She arrived off Annapolis in the Severn River on 13 July. Lt. Comdr. Braine found that the town was apprehensive over the proximity of Confederate forces and was mainly defended by 300 patients from the local hospital. Together with the gunboat Daylight, Lt. Comdr. Braine organized the town defenses and predicted that he would "give the rebels a warm reception." That day, he also sent a boat party up the South River under the command of Acting Ensign Francis G. Osborn. The two-day expedition destroyed all means of crossing the South River and thereby protected the rear of the Union forces at Annapolis.

Vicksburg received orders to return to Hampton Roads on 15 July, arrived there on 17 July, and left for the blockade off Wilmington later in July in a convoy consisting of the side-wheel steamer Nansemond and four tugboats. While deployed on patrol and reconnaissance duty off Wilmington, Vicksburg unsuccessfully chased a blockade-running side-wheel steamer on the night of 6 August and another on the night of 23 August which she found aground at daylight the next morning. The gunboat underwent repairs soon thereafter and spent September making an extensive survey of Confederate Fort Fisher and of other Southern land defenses in the Cape Fear River. After completing this mission on 10 October, she assisted in the capture of the new, steel-hulled, blockade-running British steamer Bat off the Cape Fear River and, on 20 October and 24 October, participated in two unsuccessful nighttime chases of blockade-running steamers in the same area.

Vicksburg remained off the Cape Fear River for the duration of the year and, on 26 December, assisted in covering the evacuation of troops after the unsuccessful first attack upon Fort Fisher on 24 December and 25 December. Vicksburg began the final year of the war assisting Union forces in mop-up operations following the fall of Fort Fisher during a second amphibious assault which took place between 13 January and 15 January 1865. She also participated in the bombardment of Half Moon Battery, situated on the coastal flank of the Confederate defense line which crossed Cape Fear Peninsula six miles above Fort Fisher, on 11 February. On 22 February, she was ordered north to Hampton Roads. In March, Vicksburg was one of several vessels sent to White House, Virginia, to support General Ulysses Grant's siege of Richmond by keeping open navigation between White House and the mouth of the York River.

With the end of the Civil War in April 1865, Vicksburg was decommissioned at the New York Navy Yard on 29 April and sold at auction to C. C. & H. Cable on 12 July. She was documented for merchant service on 7 August 1865. Her name last appeared on lists of merchant vessels in the autumn of 1868.

== See also ==
- Union Navy
