= CSS Raleigh (1864) =

History

Confederate States
- Name: Raleigh
- Builder: Cassidey Shipyard, Wilmington in New Hanover County, North Carolina
- Laid down: 1863
- Launched: 1864
- Commissioned: 1864
- Fate: Ran aground, broken keel, May 7, 1864

General characteristics
- Length: 150 ft (46 m)
- Beam: 32 ft (9.8 m)
- Draft: 12 ft (3.7 m)
- Propulsion: Steam engine
- Complement: 188 officers and enlisted men
- Armament: Two 6-inch Brooke rifled cannons; two smoothbore cannons

CSS Raleigh was a steam-powered Civil War casemate ironclad. She was fitted with a spar torpedo instead of an iron ram and was built in 1863–1864 by the Confederate States Navy at Wilmington, North Carolina. While she was being built her commander was Lieutenant John Wilkinson (CSN). She was put into commission on April 30, 1864, under the command of Lieutenant J. Pembroke Jones, CSN.

Built to chief CSN constructor John L. Porter's similar plans for those of the ironclad CSS North Carolina, she had been laid down and launched at the foot of Church Street; her fitting-out was completed by the shipyard J. L. Cassidey & Sons.

CSS Raleigh was one of two Richmond-class ironclads built for the Confederate Navy at Wilmington during the Civil War. A total of six Richmond-class ironclads were laid down at Richmond, Wilmington, Charleston, and Savannah in the spring of 1862. Chief naval constructor John L. Porter had designed these armored steam ships for harbor defense, adapting plans he had originally conceived in 1846, fifteen years before to the war. On April 20, 1864, the newly completed Raleigh steamed down the Cape Fear River and joined her sister ironclad CSS North Carolina, which was already in CSN service at Smithville.

Raleigh drew 13 feet (4.0 m) of water, 6 inches (15 cm) less than the North Carolina. Flag Officer William F. Lynch quickly decided to take his new ironclad over the bar at New Inlet, North Carolina and attack the Union blockading squadron at sea.

On May 6 Raleigh emerged from the Cape Fear River and stood out to the Atlantic, accompanied by CSS Yadkin and CSS Equator, where she engaged six Federal blockaders, including USS Britannia and USS Nansemond, off New Inlet.

The plan was ill-conceived, as the Richmond-class ironclads, being designed for harbor defense and calm water, were not seaworthy. Nonetheless, the officers and men of Raleigh prepared their ship for battle. The engagement that followed was shrouded in darkness and marked by confusion. Raleigh, because of her slow speed on open sea, was unable to close with the Federals. Flares and cannon fire alerted the rest of the blockading squadron, but most commanders, unaware of the ironclad's presence, assumed a blockade runner had been cornered. For the rest of the night, Raleigh steamed blindly through the blockading squadron, unnoticed. At daybreak, the ironclad returned to New Inlet and crossed the bar at 7:15 a.m. The "battle," as such, was over, neither side sustaining serious damage or gaining advantage.

After entering Cape Fear, Raleigh turned south, but soon ran hard aground on a bar known as "the Rip". As the tide went out, the now unsupported weight of the ironclad's armored casemate, cannon, and machinery bore down heavily on the aft section of her keel. Unable to sustain the added weight pressure, Raleigh "broke her back", resulting in a total loss of the new ironclad after serving just one week in the Confederate Navy. Salvage crews reclaimed her iron plating, both her Brooke rifles, both smoothbore cannon, and shipped her boilers to CSS Chattahoochee, then being repaired at Columbus, Georgia.

In 1994 the wreck was investigated by the North Carolina State Underwater Archaeology Unit with help from students of East Carolina University.
