= USS Aster =

American Civil War tugboat

History

United States
- Ordered: as Alice
- Laid down: date unknown
- Launched: date unknown
- Acquired: 25 July 1864
- Commissioned: 12 August 1864
- Out of service: 7 October 1864
- Stricken: 1864 (est.)
- Fate: Burned to prevent capture; 7 October 1864

General characteristics
- Displacement: 285 tons
- Length: not known
- Beam: 23 ft (7.0 m)
- Depth: 10 ft (3.0 m)
- Depth of hold: 10 ft (3.0 m)
- Propulsion: steam engine; screw-propelled
- Speed: not known
- Complement: 30
- Armament: one 30-pounder Parrott rifle; two heavy 12-pounder smoothbore guns

USS Aster was a steam operated tugboat acquired by the Union Navy during the American Civil War. She was used by the Navy to patrol navigable waterways of the Confederacy to prevent the South from trading with other countries.

== Service history ==
On 25 July 1864 at Philadelphia, Pennsylvania, the Union Navy purchased the wooden steamer Alice from Bishop, Son, and Company. Renamed Aster, this screw tug was placed in commission on 12 August 1864, Acting Master Samuel Hall in command.

On 25 August 1864, Secretary of the Navy Gideon Welles ordered Aster to proceed to waters off Wilmington, North Carolina, for duty in the North Atlantic Blockading Squadron. Since the ship's logs do not seem to have survived, the details of her voyage south are unknown. She apparently joined the squadron in the first fortnight of September, but, on the 16th of that month, was at Norfolk, Virginia, undergoing repairs.

She arrived off New Inlet on 7 October and began her blockading duties. About an hour before midnight, she sighted a vessel steaming toward New Inlet and gave chase. Just as she was about to cut off the blockade runner – which later proved to be the Halifax steamer Annie – Aster grounded on Carolina Shoals. Hall and his crew made every effort to refloat Aster, but failed. USS Berberry came to her aid, but was unable to pull her free. Hall then transferred his crew to Berberry and then, aided by his officers, put the torch to the ship which then blew up.
