= USS Wilderness =

Gunboat of the United States Navy

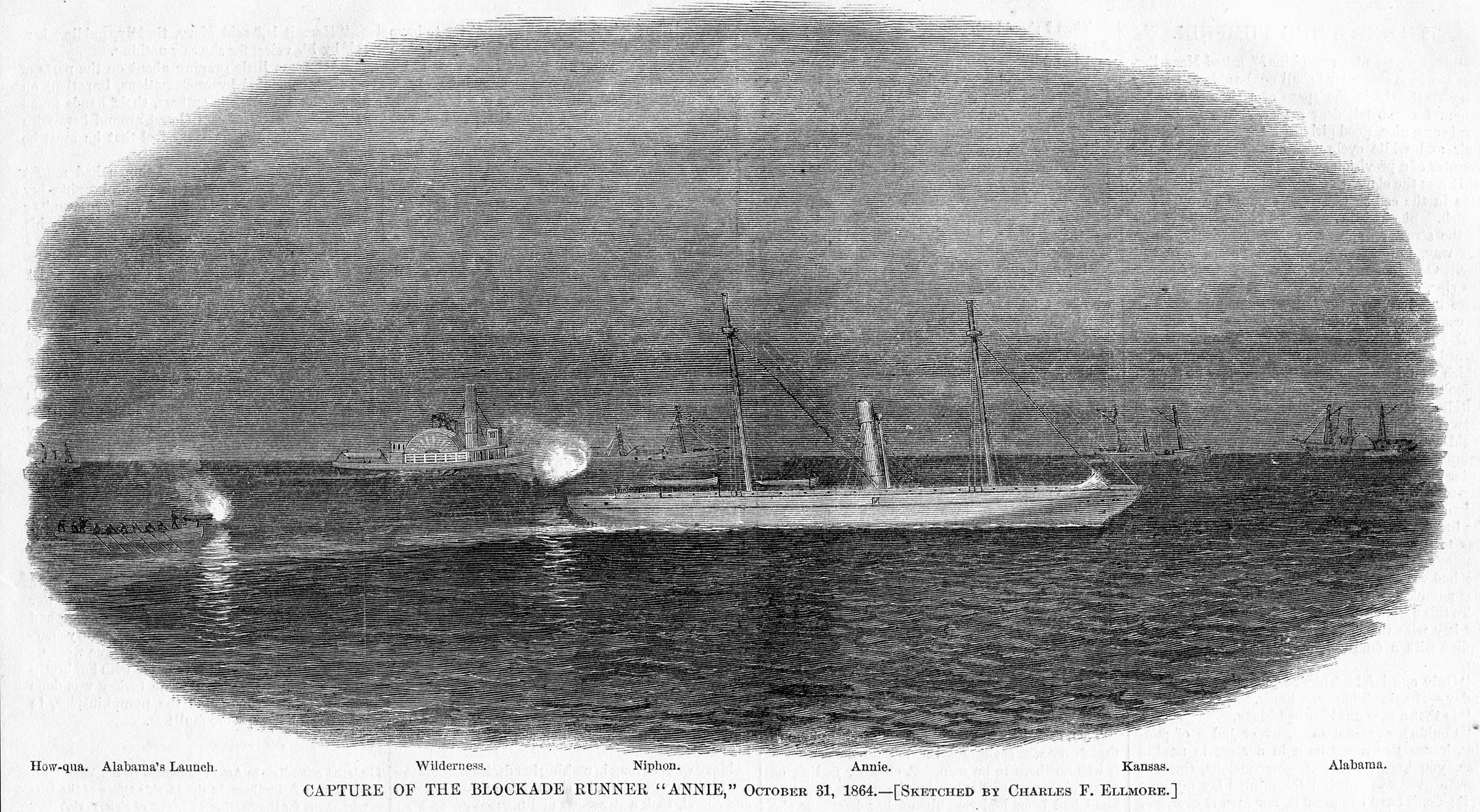

History

United States
- Name: USS Wilderness
- Laid down: 1864
- Acquired: 30 May 1864
- Commissioned: 20 July 1864
- Decommissioned: 10 June 1865
- Fate: Transferred to Treasury Department, 6 September 1865

United States
- Name: USRC Wilderness
- Acquired: 6 September 1865
- Commissioned: November 1865
- Decommissioned: April 1891
- Renamed: USRC John A. Dix, 11 June 1873
- Fate: Sold, 18 May 1891

General characteristics
- Type: Side-wheel steamer
- Displacement: 390 tons
- Length: 137 ft (42 m)
- Beam: 25 ft (7.6 m)
- Draft: 6 ft (1.8 m)
- Propulsion: Steam engine
- Speed: 13 knots (24 km/h; 15 mph)
- Armament: 4 × 24-pounder guns

USS Wilderness was a wooden-hulled, side-wheel steamship in the United States Navy during the American Civil War. After the war, she served as a revenue cutter. In 1873, she was renamed John A. Dix for former Secretary of the Treasury John Adams Dix.

== Service in the US Civil War ==
Wilderness' was built as B. N. Creary – sometimes spelled B. N. Crary – in 1864 at Brooklyn, New York. Acquired by the Union Navy at New York City on 30 May 1864 and simultaneously renamed Wilderness, she fitted out at the New York Navy Yard and was commissioned on 20 July 1864.

After arriving at Hampton Roads shortly thereafter, Wilderness was assigned immediately to the 2nd Division of the North Atlantic Blockading Squadron. She operated between Hampton Roads and various points along the James River through the end of August. While she performed a variety of duties during that time, she operated primarily as a supply ship. She also served as a transport and dispatch vessel when the occasion demanded. On the average, she apparently made two trips upriver from Hampton Roads per week, delivering fresh vegetables and provisions to the crews of naval vessels operating up the James River and to the crews of the lighthouses situated along that waterway.

On 15 July 1864, when Confederate guns located near Malvern Hill fired on Union ships, Wilderness made a night run down the James with casualties embarked, bound for the hospital at Norfolk, Virginia. On the 27th of that month, Wilderness was compelled by the heavy movement of Union troops across two pontoon bridges spanning the James to remain between them. While thus immobile, the side-wheeler observed the gunboats USS Agawam and USS Mendota shelling Confederate positions across nearby Four Mile Creek.

On 25 August, Acting Rear Admiral S. P. Lee, commanding the North Atlantic Blockading Squadron, reported to Secretary of the Navy Gideon Welles that "to promote the efficiency of the blockade of the bars" (off the North Carolina coast) he had directed Captain Melancton Smith, the commander of naval forces on the James, "to have the Wilderness prepared at once for service on the blockade of Wilmington." By 1 September, when Admiral Lee reported the composition of his squadron, he listed Wilderness as a "supply steam; ordered to fit out as gunboat and join (the) blockade."

By late October, Wilderness had been armed with a battery of four 24-pounders, enabling her to be classed as a gunboat. On 28 October, Rear Admiral David D. Porter, the new commanding officer of the North Atlantic Blockading Squadron, issued orders to Acting Master Henry Arey, commanding the newly converted sidewheeler, to "proceed and report to the senior officer off Eastern Bar (Cape Fear River) for duty on the blockade as a chaser."

Wilderness went into action almost immediately. At 19:05 on the evening of 31 October, while patrolling off New Inlet, North Carolina, she spotted a strange vessel bearing south by west, heading over the bar. Niphon, on station nearby, also saw the ship and came about. Wilderness, steaming at top speed and firing as she came, ultimately overhauled the strange vessel and captured her at 19:45.

The prize turned out to be the British blockade-runner Annie and was described by Arey as "... a fine steamer, with two propellers, one smokestack and ... schooner-rigged." Sailors from Wilderness boarded the ship, finding her cargo to consist of 540 bales of cotton, 30 tons of pressed tobacco, and 14 casks of "spirits of turpentine." Niphon took on board the passengers and crew of the runner while Wilderness took charge of the prize. During the transfer of prisoners, Confederate guns at nearby Fort Fisher opened fire on the Union vessels. One shell struck Wilderness, passing through her hurricane deck on the starboard side and going through a water tank at the port gangway, where it exploded, damaging the rim of the gunboat's port wheel.

Repaired at Beaufort, North Carolina, when the ship put into that port for coal, Wilderness resumed blockade duties off Wilmington, North Carolina soon thereafter. Shortly before the Union assault on Fort Fisher, the key Confederate stronghold guarding the approaches to the seaport of Wilmington, a daring plan to reduce some of the defenses by using an explosive-laden ship was put into motion. The sidewheel steamer Louisiana was stripped and filled with explosives; manned by a volunteer crew commanded by Commander Alexander C. Rhind; and towed into position, first by USS Sassacus and later by Wilderness, off the fort. The latter took up the tow on 18 December, but heavy weather delayed the start of the entire operation. In the final attempt, made on 23 December, Wilderness—manned by Acting Master Arey, four officers and "enough men to handle the vessel"—took Louisiana in close to the walls of Fort Fisher. Rhind and his men lit the fuses, kindled a fire aft, and then escaped in small boats to Wilderness.

The fuses set by Rhind failed to detonate the explosives, but the fire aft did. Louisiana blew up as planned, but other than to send out a heavy shock wave, had little effect. At dawn the next day, Christmas Eve, the first assault on Fort Fisher began. However, as Admiral Porter subsequently wrote, "I was in hopes I should have been able to present to the nation Fort Fisher and surrounding works as a Christmas offering, but I am sorry to say it has not been taken yet." The expedition failed dismally.

During the first attempt to reduce and invest the Confederate stronghold, on 24 and 25 December 1864, Wilderness lay in reserve offshore, in the first division. Through much of the action, Wilderness served as tender to the flagship USS Malvern and spotted her fall of shot. On the 25th, the side-wheeler took on board the bodies of the sailors who had been killed on USS Ticonderoga and USS Juniata and also received the wounded from those ships.

After transferring these casualties to Fort Jackson, Wilderness returned to Beaufort, where she took two coal schooners in tow and pulled them to Wilmington, getting underway on the 28th as Union forces were preparing to make a second attempt to take Fort Fisher. Delivering her tows soon thereafter, the side-wheel steamer supported the landings against the Confederate stronghold on 13 January 1865, taking on board a draft of troops from the transport Atlantic. She took the troops to within 500 yards of shore and, while anchored there, transferred the men to boats for the final run to shore.

The following day, Wilderness delivered mail among the fleet and took on ammunition; later, she delivered cargo to USS New Ironsides.

Subsequently, Wilderness took part in the occupation of former Confederate works at Smithville, North Carolina, on 19 January, Acting Master Arey and a boat crew from the ship participating directly in the operation. Wilderness remained in the vicinity of the mouth of the Cape Fear River into February and then returned to her former operating area, the James River.

Admiral Porter ordered Wilderness up the Chickahominy River to try to communicate with General Philip Sheridan. Collaterally, the ship was to gain all the information she could learn about the river itself and Southern forces in the area before returning to Aiken's Landing with any dispatches which needed to be delivered. Subsequently, the side-wheeler received orders to proceed without delay to New Berne, North Carolina, to cooperate with Army forces of General Forrest Sherman in the movement up the Chowan River toward Winton, North Carolina. Arriving on 2 April with dispatches from Admiral Porter, Wilderness resumed her operations in the sounds of North Carolina, performing general utility duties for the North Atlantic Blockading Squadron through the end of the Civil War.

== Revenue cutter ==
Decommissioned on 10 June 1865, Wilderness was acquired by the Treasury Department at the Boston Navy Yard on 6 September 1865 and sailed for Baltimore, Maryland, on the 17th. There, the side-wheeler was fitted put for her new duties as a revenue cutter and, following repairs and alterations, was ordered to Florida waters on 28 November.

Reaching Key West on 8 December, Wilderness operated out of that port for a year, before she shifted up the east coast to Charleston, South Carolina, on 14 December 1866 for repairs. Wilderness subsequently operated in the Gulf of Mexico, ranging from New Orleans to Veracruz, Mexico. She apparently operated out of New Orleans, Louisiana, in the gulf, through the summer of 1872.

== Renamed John A. Dix ==
Ordered to New York for repairs on 2 September 1872, Wilderness reached New York City on the 19th. Records indicate that the ship was to be dismantled. The orders, dated 3 January 1873, are recorded as "carried into effect, 11 January." Now, whether or not this means that the name was retained and an entirely new ship was built is not entirely clear. In any event, she is listed as being ordered to New Orleans for duty on 3 July. Sailing on the 7th, she arrived at her new duty station on the 19th.

During the ship's period in a "limbo" of sorts, she was renamed John A. Dix on 11 June 1873. She apparently then operated in the Gulf of Mexico, out of New Orleans, through the autumn of 1879, when she was temporarily stationed at Mobile, Alabama.

The cutter operated in the Florida Keys in the spring of 1880 and into the early 1880s. Ordered to New York City for replacement of her boilers in the autumn of 1883, she arrived there on 30 October. Ordered back to Florida waters upon completion of those repairs on 1 February 1884, she departed New York City on 13 March and arrived at Key West nine days later. Resuming operations in the Florida Keys, John A. Dix cruised the Gulf of Mexico between Florida and Texas, from the Mississippi River to the Rio Grande, through the end of the 1880s.

Ordered to New Orleans, on 28 March 1891, John A. Dix arrived there on 7 April. Placed out of commission soon thereafter, the erstwhile side-wheel gunboat was sold on 18 May 1891 at Algiers, Louisiana.

== See also ==
- Union Navy
