= USS Nansemond (1862) =

Gunboat of the United States Navy

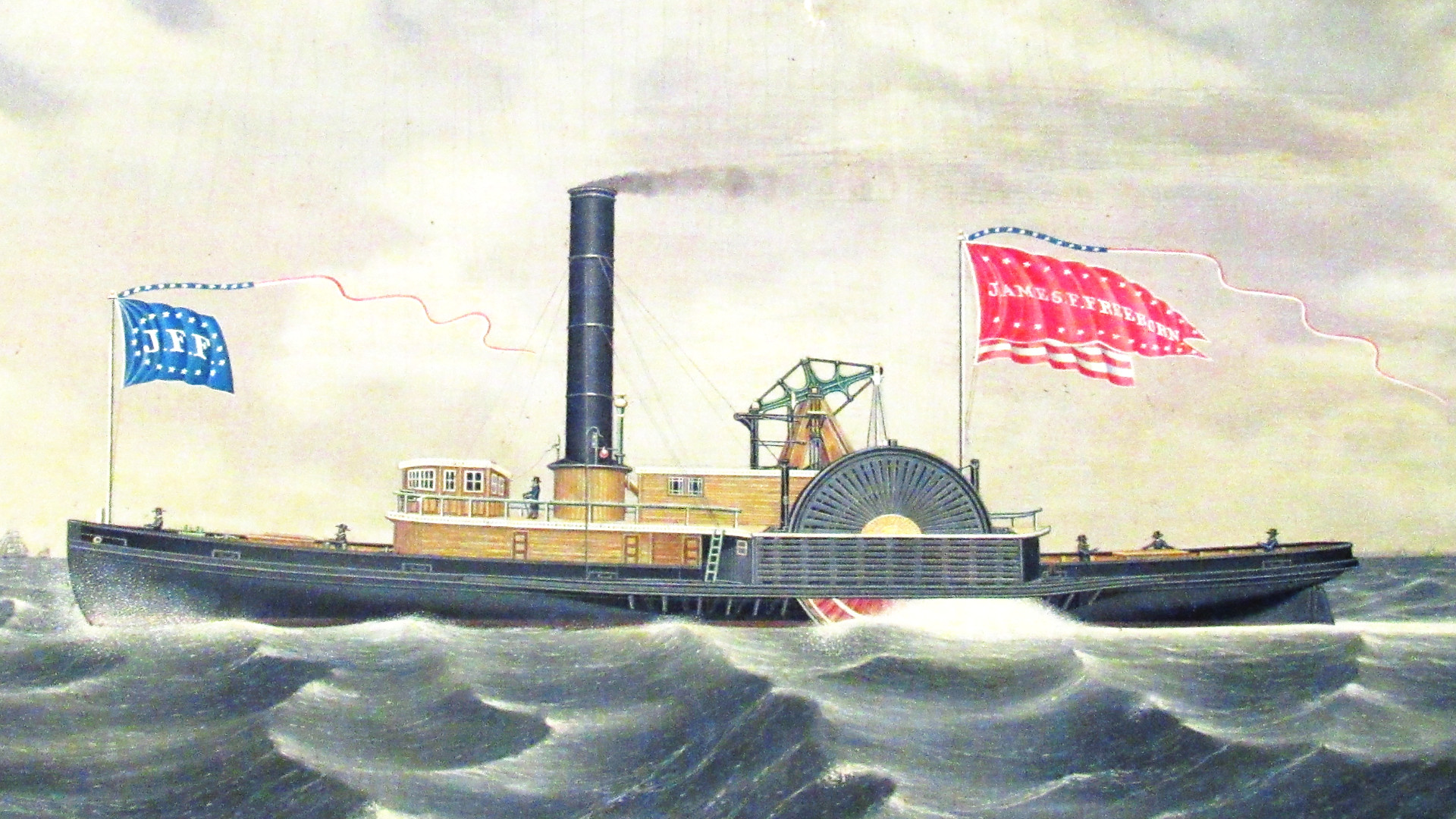
- The tugboat James F. Freeborn in merchant service, before her naval commissioning as USS Nansemond

History

United States
- Name: USS Nansemond
- Builder: Lawrence & Foulks (NY)
- Laid down: 1862
- Acquired: by purchase, 18 August 1863
- Commissioned: 19 August 1863
- Decommissioned: 8 August 1865
- Fate: Transferred to U.S. Revenue Cutter Service, 22 August 1865, renamed W.H. Crawford 20 November 1873; Sold, 24 April 1897

General characteristics
- Type: Steamer
- Displacement: 340 long tons (350 t)
- Length: 146 ft (45 m)
- Beam: 26 ft (7.9 m)
- Draft: 8 ft 3 in (2.51 m)
- Propulsion: Steam engine
- Speed: 15 kn (17 mph; 28 km/h)
- Complement: 63 officers and enlisted
- Armament: 1 × 30-pounder Parrott rifle, 2 × 24-pounder guns

The first USS Nansemond, a side wheel steamer built at Williamsburg, N.Y. in 1862, as James F. Freeborn, was purchased by the Union Navy at New York City on 18 August 1863 from Richard Squires; it was renamed Nansemond and commissioned at Baltimore on 19 August, with Lieutenant Roswell H. Lamson in command.

== Civil War service ==
After joining the North Atlantic Blockading Squadron off Wilmington on 24 August 1863, the sidewheeler chased blockade runner Douro ashore near New Inlet, North Carolina on 11 October, and destroyed her and her cargo of cotton, tobacco, turpentine, and rosin. USS Quaker City had previously captured the steamer, but, after being condemned and sold, Douro had reverted to running Confederate contraband. However, after her encounter with Nansemond, Douro was "...a perfect wreck...and past ever being bought and sold again." Squadron Commander Rear Admiral Samuel Phillips Lee reported, "Nansemond has done well off Wilmington. She discovered followed and destroyed (sic.) the Douro at night, the first instance of the kind, I believe." Ten days later four shots from Nansemond caused blockade running steamer Venus to take on water, forcing her ashore near the mouth of the Cape Fear River. After vainly trying to refloat her the next morning, Lt. Lamson set fire to the hulk.

On the evening of 4 November, USS Howquah sighted blockade runner Margaret and Jessie and pursued her through the night. The next morning, Nansemond and Army transport Fulton – who had joined in the chase – captured the notorious runner at sea, east of Myrtle Beach, South Carolina. Margaret and Jessie had previously succeeded in running the blockade 15 times.

On the evening of 6 May 1864, CSS Raleigh steamed over the bar at New Inlet and attacked blockaders USS Britannia and Nansemond while a Confederate steamer raced to sea. The following morning, Nansemond, Howquah, USS Mount Vernon, and USS Kansas repulsed a renewed attack by the Southern ram. Raleigh, while attempting to withdraw over the bar at the mouth of Cape Fear River, grounded, suffered severe damage and was destroyed by her Commander, Flag Officer William F. Lynch, to prevent her falling into Union hands.

On 20 June, Nansemond and Calypso embarked Army troops for an expedition to New River, N.C. to cut the Wilmington and Weldon Railroad. However, word of the raid reached Confederate ears, and strong Southern defensive forces compelled the Union troops to withdraw under cover of the ships' guns.

The Union was determined, however, to have Wilmington. A joint Army-Navy attack on Fort Fisher – which protected the vital Southern port – was launched on Christmas Eve, only to be repulsed the next day by determined defenders. The Union struck again on 13 January 1865 and finally conquered the bitterly contested Confederate stronghold three days later.

After supporting the Union's final drive on Richmond, Nansemond decommissioned at Washington Navy Yard on 8 August. She was transferred to the U.S. Treasury Department on 22 August and served the Revenue Cutter Service. She was renamed W. H. Crawford on 20 November 1873, operating primarily along the Atlantic coast from Baltimore to Key West. She was decommissioned on 29 September 1896 and was sold at Baltimore to Edward D. Booz on 24 April 1897. Later named General J.A. Dumont, she burned at Severn, Maryland on 22 December 1914.
