= USS Howquah =

Gunboat of the United States Navy

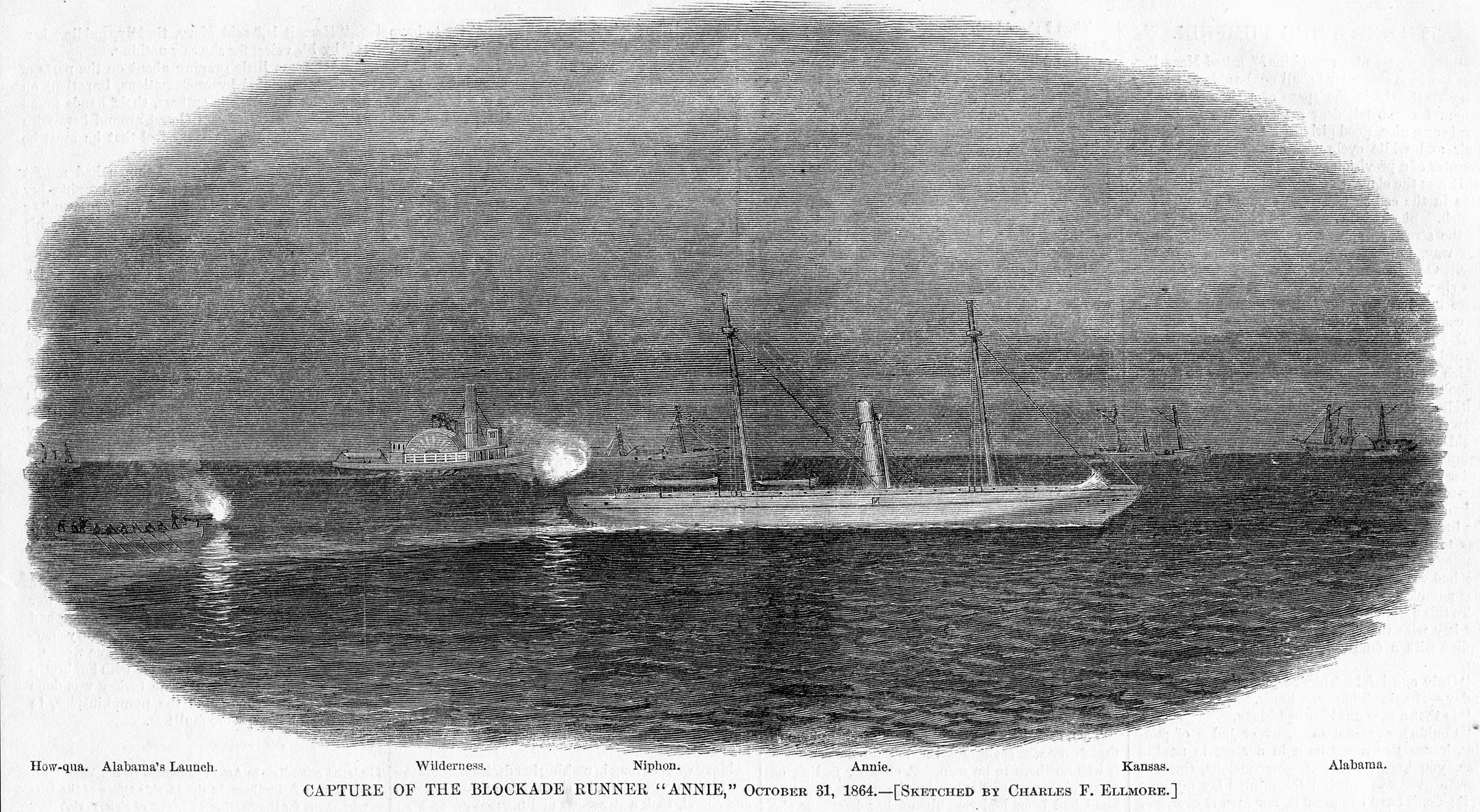

History

United States
- Name: USS Howquah
- Acquired: 17 June 1863
- Decommissioned: 22 June 1865
- Fate: Sold at auction

General characteristics
- Type: Screw gunboat
- Displacement: 460 tons
- Length: 120 ft 7 in (36.75 m)
- Beam: 22 ft 10 in (6.96 m)
- Draft: 12 ft (3.7 m)
- Speed: 10 knots
- Armament: 2 × 30-pounder Parrott rifle, 1 × 12-pounder rifle, 1 × 12-pounder

USS Howquah was a screw steamer purchased by the Union Navy in Boston from G. W. Upton on 17 June 1863, for action against Confederate commerce raider CSS Tacony which was then preying upon Northern merchantmen during what Professor Richard S. West has called "the most brilliant daredevil cruise of the war."

== Search for Tacony ==
Howquah departed Boston 25 June 1863, with Acting Volunteer Lieutenant E. F. Devens in command, to search for Tacony in the southern section of the Banks of Newfoundland but her quarry had been destroyed the day before she sailed. Tacony's captain, Lieutenant Charles W. Read, OSN, in an effort to elude the Northern gunboats who were scouring the sea for his ship, shifted his guns to captured fishing schooner Archer and put the torch to Tacony. He and his crew were captured 3 days later while attempting to escape to sea from Portland, Maine, in still another prize, Revenue cutter Caleb Gushing.

== Blockade duty ==
When Howquah returned to Boston 3 July, she received orders to sail for Wilmington, North Carolina, for blockade duty. Except for occasional brief interruptions for repairs, she remained in waters off Wilmington until close to the end of the war, usually stationed near New Inlet. There on 5 November 1863 she assisted USS Nansemond and Army transport SS Fulton capture CSS Margaret and CSS Jessie after the ship had run the blockade 15 times. Only 5 days later, she took CSS Ella, a small, fast and new side-wheel steamer subsequently serving the Navy as a picket, patrol, and dispatch vessel. Next, on 11 December, she forced an unidentified ship to run on the beach to be wrecked by a heavy sea.

On Christmas Eve she transported troops from Beaufort, North Carolina, to Bear Inlet to ruin salt works vital to the Confederate war economy. Again on 21 April 1864, she joined USS Niphon in an attack on salt works on Masonboro Sound. Her guns shelled the beach while a landing party smashed salt-making equipment ashore.

Early morning 7 May 1864, Howquah and five other blockaders engaged Confederate ironclad ram CSS Raleigh and drove her back toward the harbor to run aground and "break her back" while attempting to cross the bar to safety. On 25 September, while chasing and firing on blockade runner CSS Lynx, Howquah was caught in a cross fire from Fort Fisher and from "friendly guns" on two other Union ships, USS Governor Buckingham and USS Niphon. In this operation one of her bluejackets was killed and four others were wounded, but her hull was not seriously damaged. CSS Lynx ended up on the beach totally destroyed by fire.

== Second Battle of Fort Fisher ==
Christmas Eve 1864 found Howquah engaged in amphibious operations. This time the objective was Fort Fisher, which protected Wilmington, one of the South's most successful centers of blockade running and her last port for overseas aid. Howquah landed troops who took the Flag Pond Hill battery and bombarded enemy positions to support Union forces ashore. Unfortunately, Major General B. F. Butler nullified this success by ordering his troops to give up their beachheads and return to their ships; and Howquah had the unpleasant task of assisting in the evacuation. But in less than a month, the Northern ships were again attacking Fort Fisher in conjunction with the Army. Howquah anchored off Half Moon Battery 16 January 1865 and fired at targets ashore while her cutters evacuated the wounded. She remained in the area supporting Northern troops and the fleet's landing force with her guns until the last pockets of resistance along the Wilmington waterfront had been snuffed out.

== To the Gulf ==
Howquah was transferred to Key West for duty in the East Gulf Blockading Squadron. She was stationed in Saint George's Sound, Florida, until ordered North 1 June. She decommissioned at Philadelphia 22 June 1865 and was sold at public auction 10 August 1865.
