= USS Malvern (1860) =

Gunboat of the United States Navy

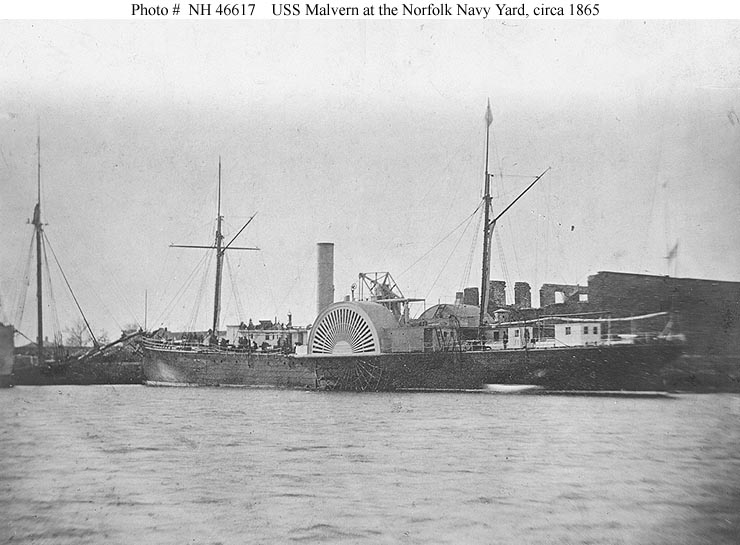
- USS Malvern at the Norfolk Navy Yard in 1865

History

United States
- Laid down: date unknown
- Launched: 1860
- Acquired: 10 December 1863
- Commissioned: 9 February 1864
- Decommissioned: 24 October 1865
- Stricken: (est.) 1865
- Captured: At sea by Union forces, April 1863
- Fate: Sold, 1866; Lost at sea, February 1895

General characteristics
- Displacement: 1,477 tons
- Length: 239 ft 4 in (72.95 m)
- Beam: 33 ft (10 m)
- Draft: 10 ft (3.0 m)
- Propulsion: Steam engine

USS Malvern (eventually renamed Ella and Annie) was a large steamer captured by the Union Navy during the American Civil War. She was then used by the Union Navy to patrol navigable waterways of the Confederacy to prevent the South from trading with other countries.

Malvern was built in 1860 as William G. Hewes by Harlan and Hollingsworth Co., Wilmington, Delaware, for Charles Morgan’s Southern Steamship Co. She commenced regular service between New York City and New Orleans, Louisiana, 11 January 1861.

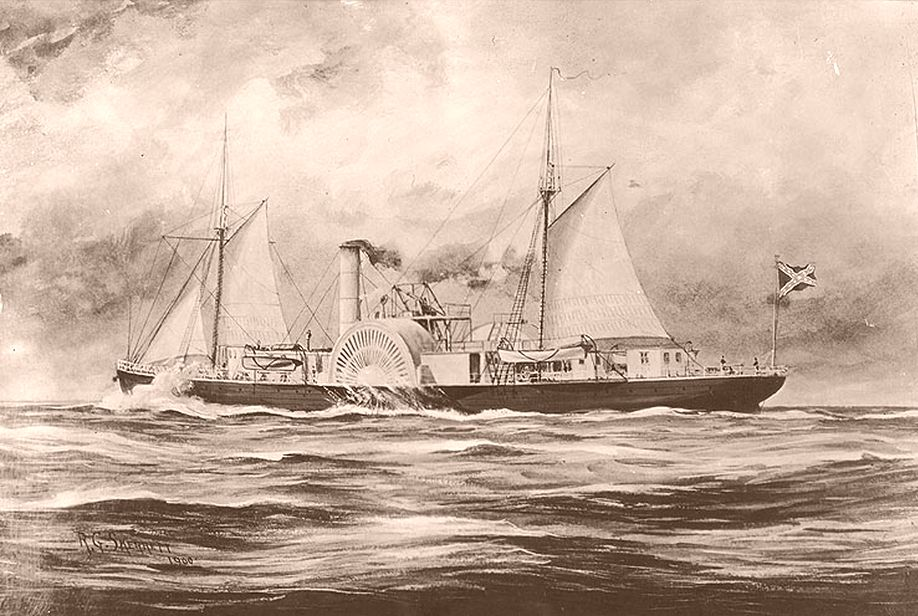
Drawing of Ella and Annie blockade runner, 1900

== Seized by the Confederacy when war commenced ==
As William G. Hewes she was seized 28 April by the Governor of Louisiana and put into service as a Confederate blockade runner, although she was not officially registered as a Confederate steamer until 5 April 1862. Because of her speed, maneuverability, and large cargo capacity Hewes was of far greater value as a blockade running transport than as a gunboat. Few of her contemporaries were able to match the 1,440 bale payload of cotton that she carried to Havana, Cuba, in April.

When Admiral David Farragut captured New Orleans, Louisiana, in April 1862, Hewes shifted her operations from there to Charleston, South Carolina, and Wilmington, North Carolina. She was then renamed Ella and Annie. Under the Importing & Exporting Co. of South Carolina she renewed blockade running to Bermuda in April 1863.

== Captured by Union forces ==
Damage sustained during a hurricane in September necessitated repairs in Bermuda. Ella and Annie departed there 5 November in company with steamer R. E. Lee. The two ships separated off Carolina and Ella and Annie steamed for Wilmington, North Carolina. She was delayed by a storm and intercepted the morning of 8 November by USS Niphon (1863) off New Inlet, North Carolina. Capt. Frank N. Bonneau, CSN, in command of the blockade runner, rammed the northern gunboat in a desperate attempt at evasion. A broadside from Niphon, Acting Master Joseph B. Breck, USN, in command, killed one man in Ella and Annie, riddled her hull, and brought her to.

A boarding party from Niphon captured Ella and Annie and her valuable cargo, and a prize crew took her to Boston, Massachusetts. Captain Bonneau was later convicted of piracy by a Boston court, but the presiding officer, who had been a flag officer himself, suspended the sentence on the grounds that he would have acted in a like manner had he been in similar circumstances.

=== Captured ship acquired by the Union Navy, renamed USS Malvern ===
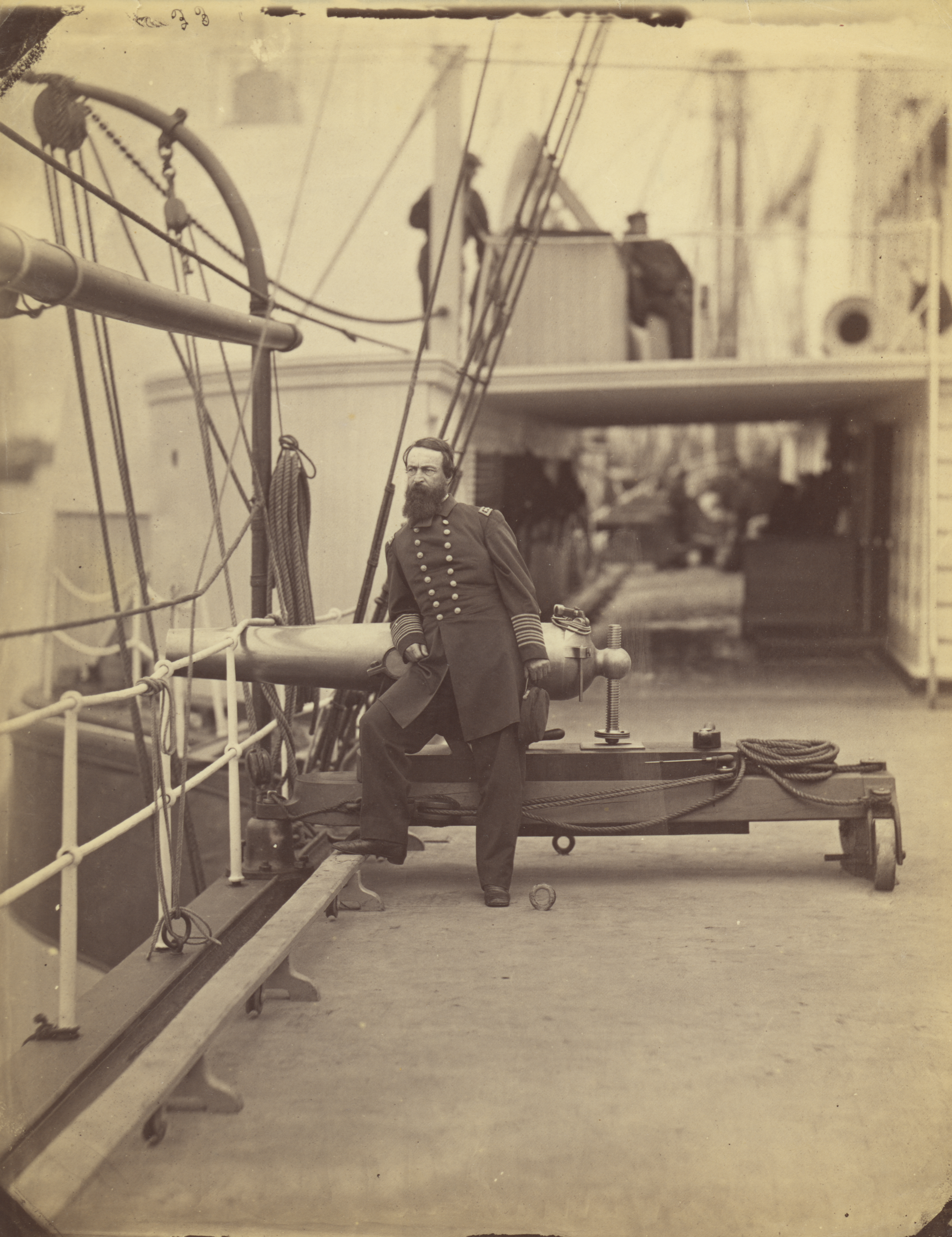
Rear Admiral Porter on the deck of Malvern

Ella and Annie was condemned as a prize of war and sold to the navy. Hastily armed, renamed Malvern and provisionally commissioned at the Boston Navy Yard 10 December, she was sent to intercept Chesapeake, which had been hijacked at sea by passengers professing allegiance to the Confederacy. Chesapeake was found abandoned, taken to Halifax, Nova Scotia, and turned over to British authorities.

Malvern was formally commissioned 9 February 1864 at Boston Navy Yard. Assigned to the North Atlantic Blockading Squadron, she became Admiral David Dixon Porter's flagship. She participated in the campaign that resulted in the capture of Fort Fisher, North Carolina, in December 1864 and January 1865. She captured blockade running steamers Stag and Charlotte 19 January off New Inlet, North Carolina, and participated in the attack 18 February on Fort Anderson, Cape Fear River.

=== Malvern transports President Abraham Lincoln to Richmond ===
Malvern was frequently utilized for conferences between Lieutenant General Ulysses S. Grant, Rear Admiral Porter, and U.S. President Abraham Lincoln. Her last notable service for the Navy was to convey the President up the James River to Richmond, Virginia, when that city was evacuated by the Confederates on 2 April. A contingent of armed guards from the Malvern protected the President during his visit to the captured Confederate capital city, now under U.S. control, where Lincoln was greeted amicably by former slaves, who hailed him as a hero and credited for their liberation. Even some Richmonders greeted Lincoln amicably as well, with one Virginian girl giving him a bouquet of flowers for his role in ending slavery.

==== Meeting between Duff Green and Abraham Lincoln ====
After Lincoln's visit to Richmond on 4 April, Democratic politician and Confederate supporter Duff Green boarded Malvern, demanding to naval personnel that they take him to speak to President Lincoln, which was done. Calling Green a friend, Lincoln greeted him amicably with a smile at first, however, Green did not reciprocate in kind, refusing to shake Lincoln's hand when it was offered. In full view of Rear Admiral Porter, Green then proceeded to verbally berate Lincoln, calling him a tyrant, a murderer, accusing him of visiting Virginia only to gloat boastfully over the defeated Confederacy, as well as accusing him of starting the Civil War. After patiently listening to Green berate him for a while, Lincoln's smile soon disappeared and he became incensed, angrily condemning Green as being a traitor to the United States for supporting its wartime enemy, the Confederacy:

Stop, you political tramp. You, the aider and abettor of those who have brought all this ruin upon your country, without the courage to risk your person in defense of the principles you profess to espouse! A fellow who stood by to gather up the loaves and fishes, if any should fall to you! A man who had no principles in the North, and took none South with him! A political hyena who robbed the graves of the dead, and adopted their language as his own! You talk of the North cutting the throats of the Southern people. You have all cut your own throats, and, unfortunately, have cut many of those of the North. Miserable impostor, vile intruder! Go, before I forget myself and the high position I hold! Go, I tell you, and don't desecrate this national vessel another minute!

Green, surprised and left speechless by Lincoln's rare bout of anger, quickly exited the room. Porter then ordered military personnel to remove Green from Malvern and not to allow him to board the ship again.

=== Decommissioning ===
Malvern decommissioned 24 October 1865 at New York City.

== Post-war service after decommissioning ==
Malvern was sold at auction at New York to S. G. Bogart, who promptly resold her to her original owner. She was again named William G. Hewes and reconditioned for passenger and freight service at Wilmington, Delaware, during January 1866. Charles Morgan then operated her from New Orleans to the Texas Gulf ports until 1878, when he turned his steamers over to the Louisiana & Texas Railroad, which he owned. Hewes' great-grandson was a land developer and contractor in the Gulf of Mexico before World War II. A report filed in Texas Contractors Monthly states that Hewes had to sell some of the ship's hardware after losing to J.O. Winston in a high stakes poker match. Those materials were then incorporated into the construction of a grand estate for Mr. Winston's wife, named Malvern, which was designed and built by famed architect John Staub in the Memorial area of Houston, TX.

Hewes served in the West Indies fruit trade for many years. She was caught in a violent Gulf storm on 19 or 20 February 1895 and wrecked on Colorado Reef off the coast of Cuba.
