= USS Eolus (1864) =

Gunboat of the United States Navy

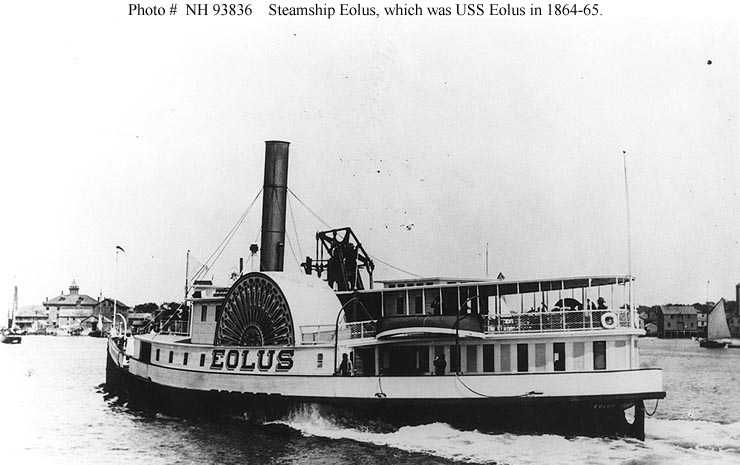

History

United States
- Acquired: 26 July 1864
- Commissioned: 12 August 1864
- Decommissioned: 24 June 1865

General characteristics
- Displacement: 368 ton
- Length: 140 ft (43 m)
- Beam: 25 ft (7.6 m)
- Draught: 7 ft (2.1 m)
- Propulsion: Sidewheel steamer
- Speed: 16 mph
- Armament: 3 × 30-pdr. r., 2 × 24-pdr. how.

The USS Eolus was a 368-ton side wheel steamship that served in the Union Navy from 1864 to 1865 before becoming a commercial steamship.

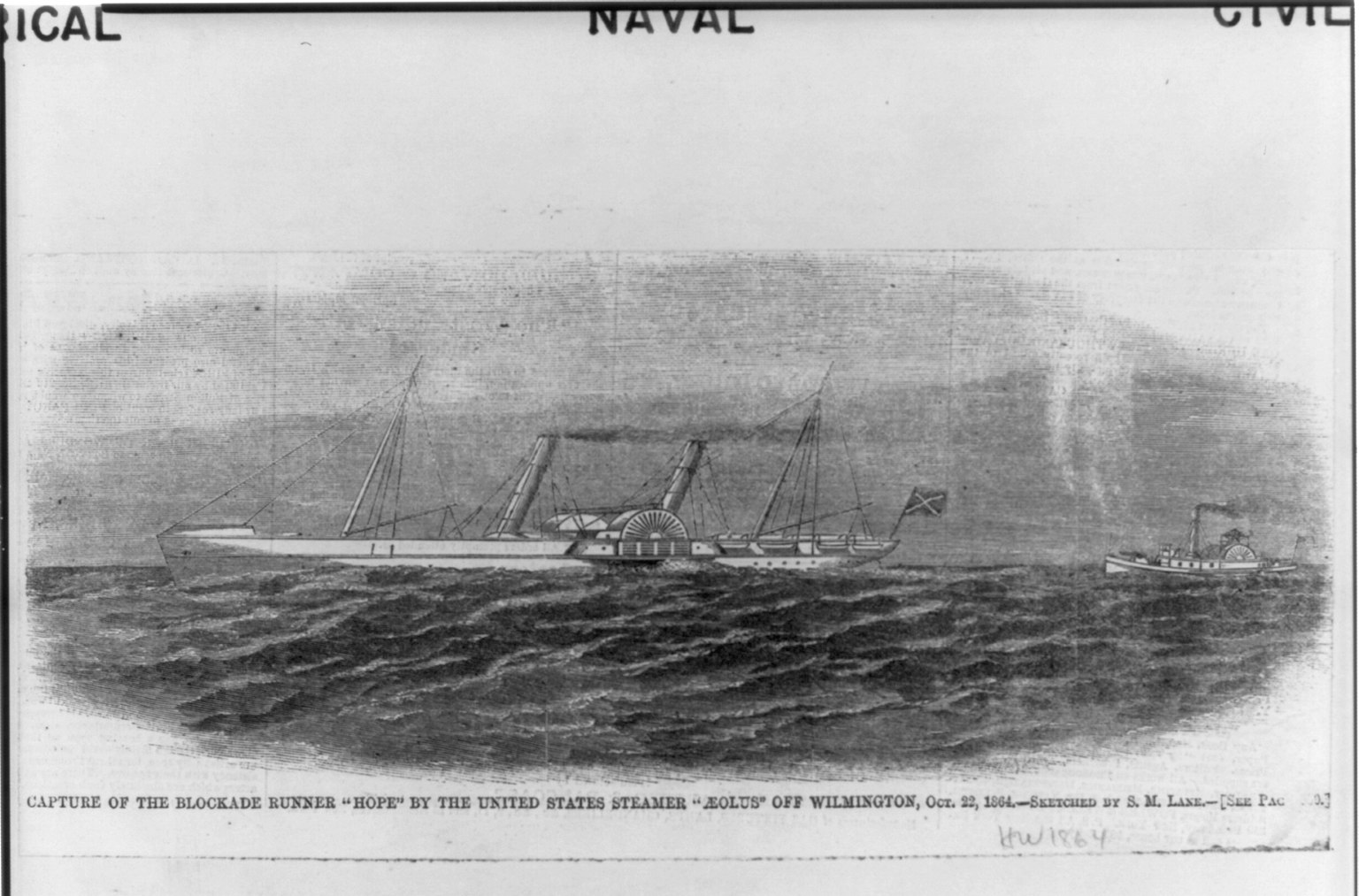
USS Eolus captures CSS Hope.

== Union Navy ==
Eolus was built at Newburgh, New York, for civilian employment, but was purchased by the Union Navy upon completion. Outfitted as a gunboat, she was commissioned in August 1864 and, following a brief search off the Atlantic Coast for the Confederate raider, CSS Tallahassee joined the blockading forces off North Carolina.

Eolus patrolled the coast, rivers, and sounds of North Carolina, enforcing the blockade and acting as picket. She carried men, messages, mail, supplies, orders, and ammunition to the large ships of the squadron and transferred their wounded to hospital ships. During October 1864, she captured the blockade runner Hope and assisted in the capture of the Lady Sterling. Late in the year and in mid-January 1865, Eolus took part in the attacks that captured Fort Fisher, thus closing the port of Wilmington to blockade runners. She continued operations in North Carolina waters from then until after the Civil War's end.

== Civilian service ==
In June 1865, Eolus went north to Boston, Massachusetts, for decommissioning. USS Eolus was sold at the beginning of August 1865 and soon began a long career as a commercial steamer. She was broken up in 1894.
