= Second Battle of Pocotaligo =

Battle of the American Civil War

- Part of the American Civil War
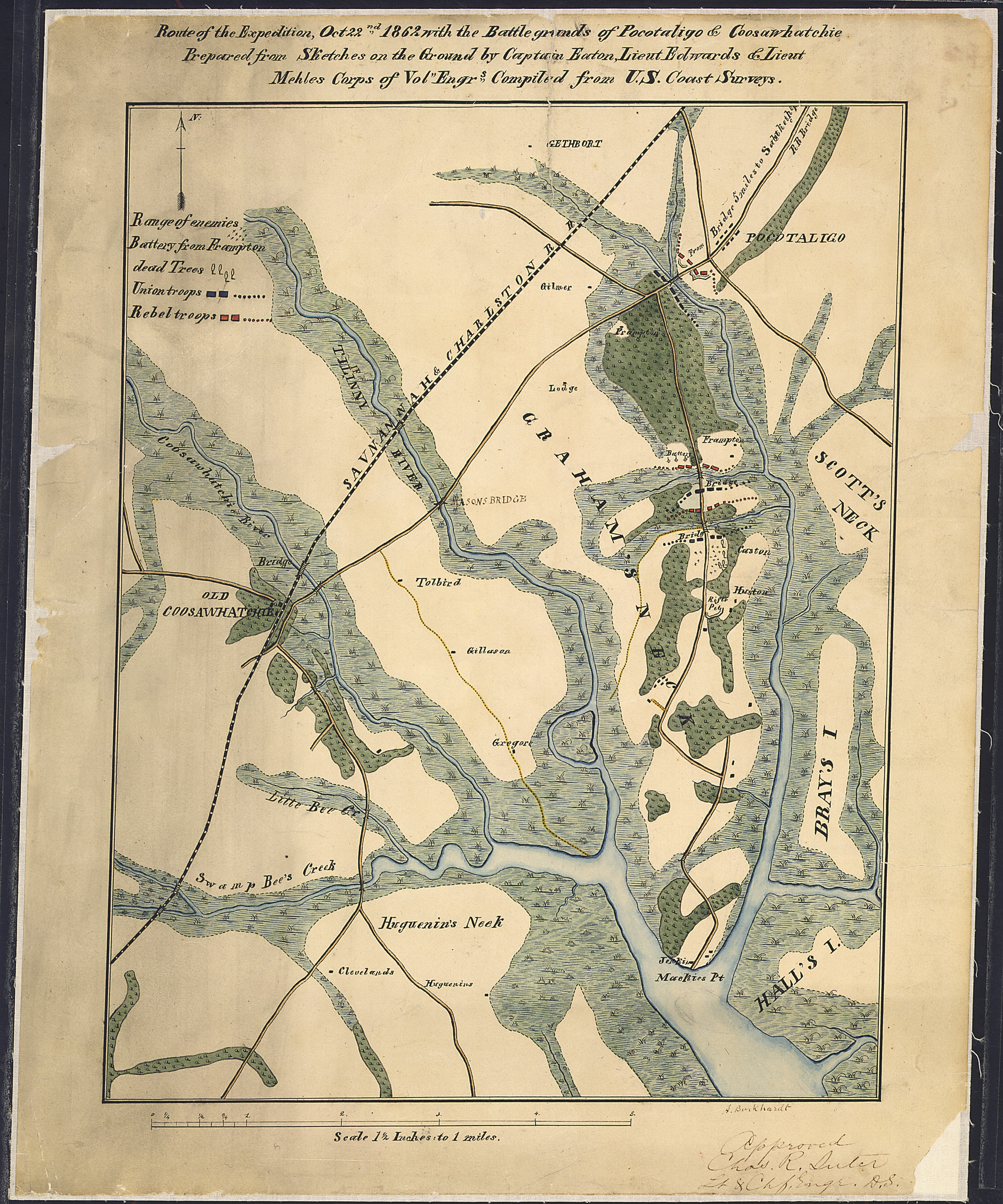
- Map of the battle and route of the expedition
Date	October 22, 1862
Location	Yemassee, South Carolina 32°38′13″N 80°51′48″W
Result	Confederate victory

Belligerents
United States (Union)	(Confederate States of America) CSA (Confederacy)

Commanders and leaders
Brigadier General John M. Brannan	Colonel William S. Walker; Stephen Elliott Jr.

Units involved
X Corps	Beaufort District, Department of South Carolina

Strength
4,500	2,000 With additional reinforcements from Charleston

Casualties and losses
43 killed 294 wounded 3 missing	21 killed 124 wounded 18 missing

The Second Battle of Pocotaligo, or Battle of Pocotaligo Bridge, or Battle of Yemassee, often referred to as simply the Battle of Pocotaligo, took place during the American Civil War on October 22, 1862, near Yemassee, South Carolina.

The primary Union objective was to sever the Charleston and Savannah Railroad in order to isolate Charleston, South Carolina and disrupt the transportation of Confederate troops and supplies to, from and through the state.

== Order of battle ==
=== Confederate ===
Commanding: Colonel William Stephen Walker

Initial force:

- Company E, 11th South Carolina Infantry - Cpt. John H. Mickler
- 1st South Carolina Sharpshooters (Companies B, C, D) - Cpt. Joseph B. Allston
- 1st South Carolina Cavalry Battalion
- Rutledge Mounted Rifles
- Kirk's Partisan Rangers - Cpt. Manning J. Kirk
- Charleston Light Dragoons
- Beaufort Volunteer Artillery - Cpt. Stephen Elliott, Jr.
- Hanover Artillery - Cpt. George W. Nelson
- LaFayette Artillery - Lt. L. F. LeBleux

Reinforcements from Charleston

- 7th South Carolina Infantry Battalion - Lt. Col. Patrick H. Nelson
- 11th South Carolina Infantry (Companies C, D, K) - Maj. John J. Harrison (k)
- 14th South Carolina Cavalry Battalion - Maj. Joseph H. Morgan

Reinforcements from Grahamville

- 3rd South Carolina Cavalry - Lt. Col. Thomas H. Johnson
- 1st South Carolina Sharpshooters (Two Companies)

=== Union` ===
Commanding: Brig. Gen. John M. Brannan

1st Brigade: Col. John Lyman Chatfield (w) and Col. Tilghman H. Good

- 6th Connecticut Volunteer Infantry
- 3rd New Hampshire Volunteer Infantry
- 4th New Hampshire Volunteer Infantry
- 48th New York Volunteer Infantry - Col. William B. Barton
- 76th Pennsylvania Volunteer Infantry - Col. Dewitt Strawbridge

2nd Brigade: Brig. Gen. Alfred Terry

- 3rd Rhode Island Volunteer Infantry
- 47th Pennsylvania Volunteer Infantry - Col. Tilghman H. Good
- 55th Pennsylvania Volunteer Infantry - Col. Richard White
- 7th Connecticut Volunteer Infantry

Engineers

- 1st New York Engineers (Two Companies) - Col. Edward W. Serrell

Cavalry

- 1st Massachusetts Volunteer Cavalry

Artillery

- Battery B, 1st US Artillery
- Batteries C, E, K, L, M 3rd Rhode Island Heavy Artillery

== Battle ==
On October 21, 1862, a 4200-man Union force, under the command of Brigadier General John M. Brannan, embarked on troop transport ships and left from Hilton Head, South Carolina. Brannan's orders were "to destroy the railroad and railroad bridges on the Charleston and Savannah line."

Commodore Sylvanus William Godon agreed support the amphibious assault, taking troops on the gunboats in his squadron. The soldiers were assigned as follows:

- USS Paul Jones, sidewheel steam gunboat, Capt. Charles Steadman, commanding naval forces, towing Wabash launches.
- Transport Steamer Ben Deford, with 600 of the 47th Pennsylvania Infantry Regiment and 400 of the 55th Pennsylvania Infantry Regiment.
- USS Conemaugh, sidewheel steam gunboat, Capt. Reed Werden, pilot Samuel Hugeunin, with 350 of the 4th New Hampshire Infantry Regiment.
- USS Wissahickon, screw steamer Unadilla-class gunboat, Capt. Albert N. Smith, with 250 of the 4th New Hampshire Infantry Regiment
- USS Boston, sidewheel steam transport, Capt. Cromwell, with 500 of the 7th Connecticut Infantry Regiment and 380 of the 3rd New Hampshire Infantry Regiment.
- USS Patroon, wooden screw steamer gunboat, Acting Master William D. Urann, pilot Evan Brown, with 50 of the 3rd New Hampshire Infantry Regiment.
- USS Uncas, screw steamer gunboat, Acting Master Lemuel G. Crane, with 50 of the 3rd New Hampshire Infantry Regiment.
- USS Darlington, sidewheel steam transport, Acting Master J. W. Godfrey, with 300 of the 6th Connecticut Infantry Regiment.
- USS Relief, schooner storeship, pilot Neptune Huguenin, with 200 of the 6th Connecticut Infantry Regiment.
- USS Marblehead, screw steamer Unadilla-class gunboat, with 230 of the 3rd Rhode Island Heavy Artillery Regiment.
- USS Vixen, sidewheel steam coast survey boat, with 70 of the 3rd Rhode Island Heavy Artillery Regiment.
- USS Flora, double screw iron steamship, with 300 of the 76th Pennsylvania Infantry Regiment.
- USS Water Witch, wooden-hull sidewheel steamer gunboat, with 130 of the 76th Pennsylvania Infantry Regiment.
- Army gunboat George Washington, with 250 of the 1st New York Engineer Regiment.
- USS Planter, sidewheel steamer transport, with 300 of the 48th New York Infantry Regiment.

Under protection of this Naval Squadron, Brannan's Division steamed up the Broad River, and disembarked the next morning at Mackey Point (between the Pocotaligo and Coosawhatchie Rivers), less than ten miles from the Charleston & Savannah railroad. The 47th and 55th Pennsylvania Infantry Regiments, under Colonel Tilghman H. Good's command, began the march toward Pocotaligo. A smaller detachment of 300 men – two companies of engineers and the 48th New York regiment was ordered up the Coosawhatchie River to destroy the bridge at Coosawhatchie and then tear up the rails as they advanced on Pocotaligo.

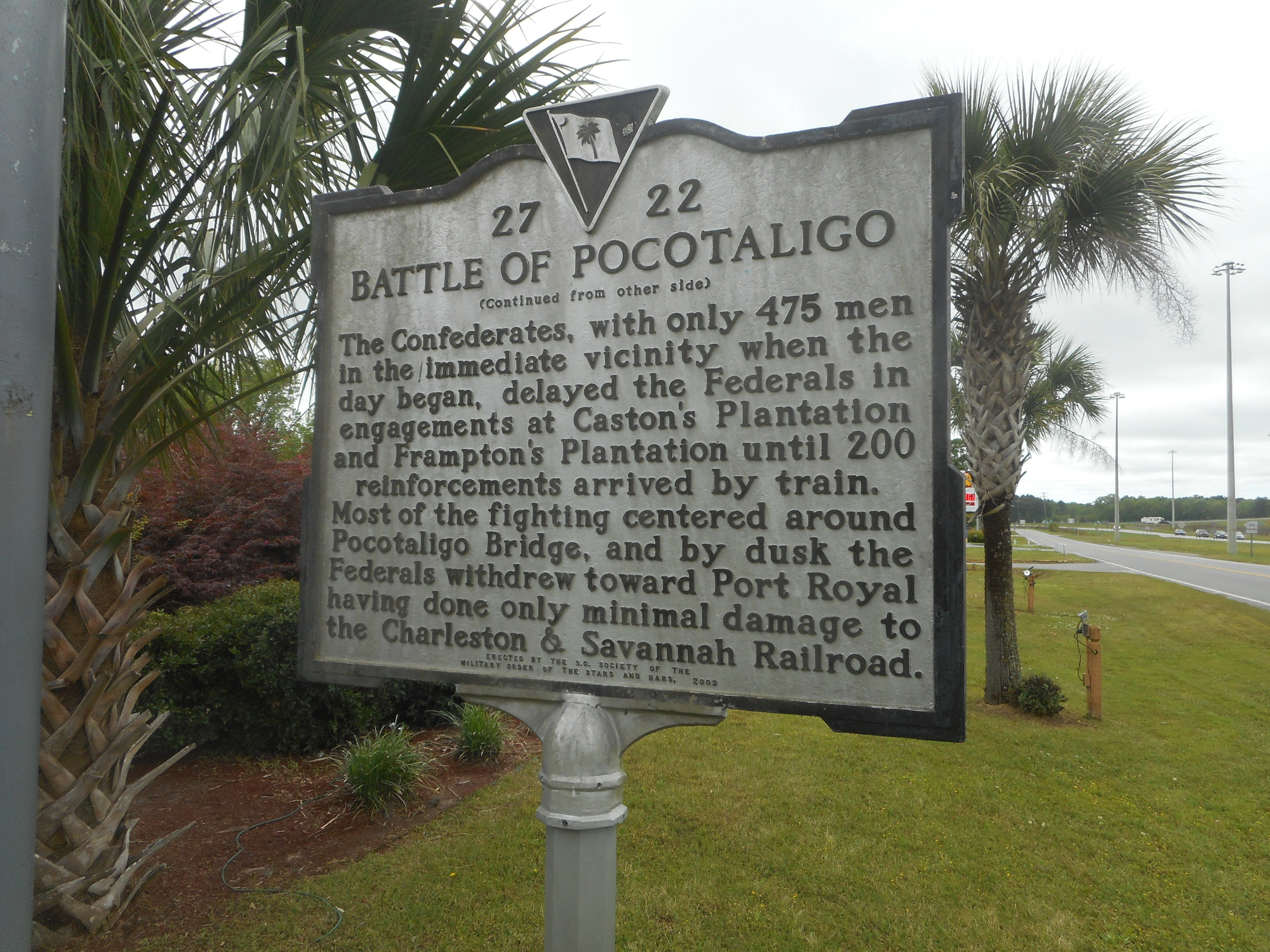
Historical marker, Battle of Pocotaligo, Point South Drive (the frontage road along northbound US 17) west of the northeastern terminus at Yemassee Road in Point South, South Carolina

Colonel William S. Walker, the Confederate commander responsible for defending the railroad, called for reinforcement from Savannah and Charleston. He deployed his available forces to counter the two Union advances, sending 200 of his men to guard the bridges, and dispatching the Beaufort Volunteer Artillery (CS), along with two companies of cavalry and some sharpshooters in support, to meet the main Union advance on the Mackey Point road. The Confederates encountered Brannan's Division near the abandoned Caston's Plantation and the artillery opened fire with their two howitzers. The Confederates retreated when the Union artillery responded.

With Brannan in pursuit, Walker's men slowly withdrew, falling back to their defensive fieldworks at Pocotaligo. The Union troops encountered the Confederates on the opposite side of a muddy marsh, and their advance stalled. Brigadier General Alfred Terry, in command of the Second Brigade, ordered the nearly 100 Sharps rifleman of the 7th Connecticut Infantry forward to the edge of the woods where the Union forces had taken cover. The rapid fire of the repeating rifles quickly suppressed the fire from the Confederate battery and associated infantry across the marsh, and they were soon ordered to cease firing to preserve ammunition. The opposing forces blazed away with cannon and musket fire at intervals for more than two hours, until Confederate reinforcements arrived. By then it was late in the day, and the Union troops were running low on ammunition.

== Aftermath ==
As dusk descended, Brannan realized that the railroad bridge could not be reached, and ordered a retreat up the Mackay's Point road to the safety of the flotilla. The Confederate Rutledge Mounted Rifles and Kirk's Partisan Rangers pursued, but the 47th Pennsylvania Infantry Regiment Union rearguard held them off. Brannan's troops reembarked at Mackay's Point the next morning and returned to Hilton Head.

Several of the Union Army regiments participating in this battle sustained a significant number of casualties, many of whom were treated at the Union Army's post hospital at Hilton Head.
