= First Battle of Pocotaligo =

Battle of the American Civil War

- Part of the American Civil War
Date	May 29, 1862
Location	Yemassee, South Carolina 32°38′13″N 80°51′48″W
Result	Union victory

Belligerents
United States (Union)	(Confederate States of America) CSA (Confederacy)

Commanders and leaders
Benjamin C. Christ	Colonel William S. Walker

Casualties and losses
2 killed and 9 wounded	2 killed, 6 wounded and 1 missing

The First Battle of Pocotaligo was a battle in the American Civil War fought on May 29, 1862 near Yemassee, South Carolina. The Union objective was to sever the Charleston and Savannah Railroad and thus isolate Charleston, South Carolina.

== Battle ==
On May 28, 1862 a Union detachment from the 50th Pennsylvania Infantry, 8th Michigan Infantry, 79th New York Infantry and 1st Massachusetts Cavalry supported by the 1st Connecticut Volunteer Light Battery, all under Colonel Benjamin C. Christ left Beaufort, South Carolina to demonstrate against the Charleston and Savannah Railroad. The force marched toward Pocotaligo, driving back pickets along the way. Some severe fighting took place at Pocotaligo where much of the bridge had been removed. About 300 Union men were able to cross the creek and drive the Confederates into the woods. Since the damage to the bridge and action against the Confederate force was in line with the mission's objective, the Union force withdrew. The Union expedition lost 2 killed and 9 wounded. The Confederates lost 2 killed, 6 wounded and 1 missing.
