= Admiral Elliot =

Admiral Elliot may refer to:

- Charles Elliot (1801–1875), British Royal Navy admiral
- Charles Elliot (1818–1895), British Royal Navy admiral
- George Elliot (Royal Navy officer, born 1784) (1784–1863), British Royal Navy admiral
- George Elliot (Royal Navy officer, born 1813) (1813–1901), British Royal Navy admiral
- John Elliot (Royal Navy officer) (1732–1808), British Royal Navy admiral
- Walter John Elliot (1914–1979), Canadian Navy surgeon-rear admiral

== See also ==
- Middleton Stuart Elliott (1872–1952), United States Navy vice admiral
