= Henry S. Elliott =

American attorney and politician

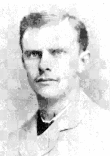

United States Commissioner for the Western District of Washington
- In office April 13, 1923 – March 26, 1942

Personal details
- Born: March 26, 1858 Beaufort, South Carolina, U.S.
- Died: April 22, 1942 (aged 84) Seattle, Washington, U.S.
- Party: Democratic
- Spouse: Helen Elkhart
- Children: 3
- Parents: Stephen Elliott Jr. (father); Charlotte Stuart (mother)
- Education: Columbia University

Henry S. Elliott (March 26, 1858 – April 22, 1942) was an American attorney and politician who served as the United States Commissioner for the Western District of Washington as a Democrat.

== Life ==
Henry S. Elliott was born on March 26, 1858, to Charlotte Stuart and Stephen Elliott Jr., future Confederate Brigadier General. He graduated from Columbia University and was admitted to the bar in 1879. In 1885 he married Helen Elkhart and later had three children with her.

In 1882 he moved to Wyoming and served as prosecuting attorney of Johnson County for two terms and as mayor of Buffalo for one term. In 1889 he was selected as one of the Democratic delegates to the Wyoming constitutional convention to draft its constitution to be submitted for statehood and served as temporary chairman. In 1891 he left Wyoming and moved to Centralia, Washington, and later moved to Seattle in 1910.

On April 13, 1923, he was appointed as United States Commissioner for the Western District of Washington, Northern Divisions and served until March 26, 1942. On April 22, 1942, he died in Seattle, Washington.
