= USS Uncas =

USS Uncas has been the name of more than one United States Navy ship, and may refer to:

- USS Uncas (1843), a steamer in commission from 1862 to 1863
- USS Uncas (1893), later redesignated Ocean Tug No. 51, AT-51, and YT-110, an armed tug in commission from 1898 to 1922
- USS Uncas (SP-689), later renamed USS SP-689, a patrol boat in commission from 1917 to 1918
- USS Uncas (YT-242), a tug in commission from 1942 to 1946
