= Joseph C. Hibson =

American Civil War Medal of Honor recipient (1843–1911)

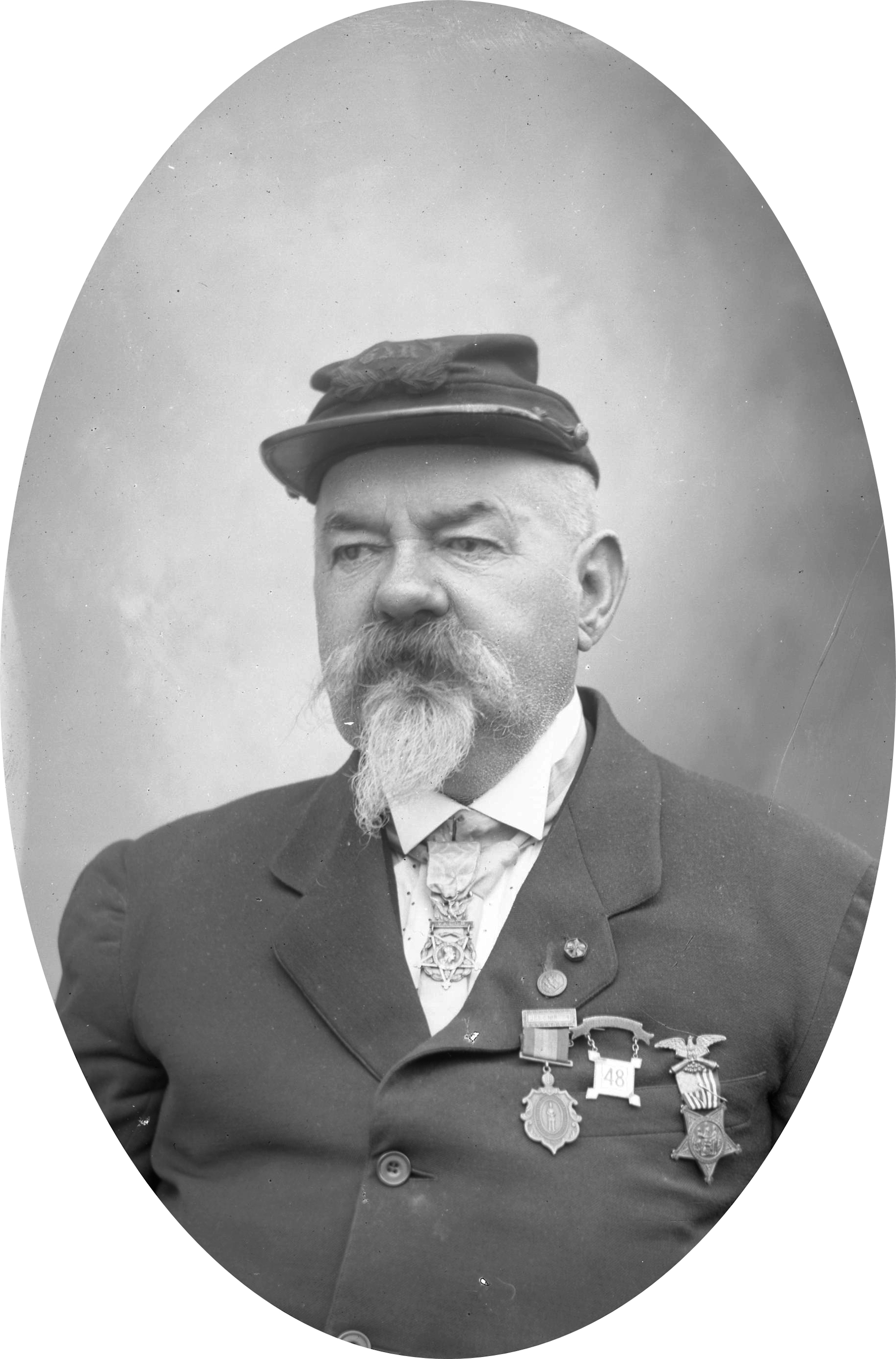
- Born: August 3, 1843; London, England
- Died: April 14, 1911 (aged 67); New York City
- Burial place: Cypress Hills Cemetery, New York City
- Military career
- Allegiance: United States
- Branch: United States Army; Union Army
- Rank: Corporal
- Units: Company C, 48th New York Infantry
- Conflicts: American Civil War
- Awards: Medal of Honor

Joseph C. Hibson (August 3, 1843 - April 14, 1911) was a Union Army soldier in the American Civil War who received the U.S. military's highest decoration, the Medal of Honor.

Hibson was born in London, England on August 3, 1843, and joined the Army from New York City in August 1861. He was awarded the Medal of Honor, for extraordinary heroism on 13,14 and 18 July 1863, while serving as a Private with Company C, 48th New York Infantry, near Fort Wagner, South Carolina. His Medal of Honor was issued on October 23, 1897. He was transferred to the Veteran Reserve Corps in December 1863.

In 1908, the United States Congress passed a private bill increasing Hibson's pension to $55 per month in lieu of what he had been receiving previously. Hibson died at the age of 67, on April 14, 1911, and was buried at Cypress Hills Cemetery in New York City.

== Medal of Honor citation ==
The President of the United States of America, in the name of Congress, takes pleasure in presenting the Medal of Honor to Private Joseph C. Hibson, United States Army, for extraordinary heroism on July 13–14 & 18, 1863, while serving with Company C, 48th New York Infantry, in action at Fort Wagner, South Carolina. While voluntarily performing picket duty under fire on 13 July 1863, Private Hibson was attacked and his surrender demanded, but he killed his assailant. The day following he responded to a call for a volunteer to reconnoiter the enemy's position, and went within the enemy's lines under fire and was exposed to great danger. On 18 July he voluntarily exposed himself with great gallantry during an assault, and received three wounds that permanently disabled him for active service.
