= Charles Brown (Medal of Honor, 1864) =

American soldier in the American Civil War

Charles E. Brown
- Born: December 11, 1841; Schuylkill County, Pennsylvania
- Died: February 20, 1919 (aged 77); Schuylkill Haven, Pennsylvania
- Burial place: Schuylkill Haven Union Cemetery, Schuylkill Haven, Pennsylvania
- Military career
- Allegiance: United States of America
- Branch: United States Army; Union Army
- Service years: September 9, 1861 to July 30, 1865
- Rank: Sergeant
- Unit: 50th Regiment Pennsylvania Volunteer Infantry - Company C
- Conflicts: Battle of Globe Tavern
- Awards: Medal of Honor

Sergeant Charles E. Brown (December 11, 1841 – February 20, 1919) was an American soldier who fought in the American Civil War. Brown received the country's highest award for bravery during combat, the Medal of Honor, for his action during the Battle of Globe Tavern on 19 August 1864. He was honored with the award on 1 December 1864.

== Biography ==
Brown was born in Schuylkill County, Pennsylvania, on 11 December 1841. He enlisted into the 50th Pennsylvania Infantry on 9 September 1861. While in that battalion, he was promoted to Sergeant and went on to earn the Medal of Honor for capturing the battle flag of the 47th Virginia Infantry during the Battle of Globe Tavern on 19 August 1864. He was subsequently promoted to 1st Lieutenant and then captain in command of his company, having fought throughout the war. He mustered out of service on 30 July 1865. The flag he captured is on display at the Museum of the Confederacy in Richmond, Virginia.

== Medal of Honor citation ==
Capture of flag of 47th Virginia Infantry (Confederate States of America).

== See also ==
- List of American Civil War Medal of Honor recipients: A–F
