= Stephen Elliott Jr. =

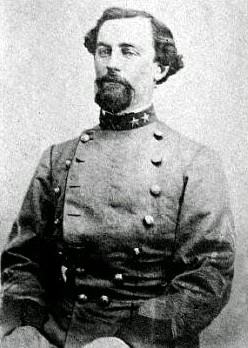
- Born: October 26, 1830; Beaufort, South Carolina
- Died: February 21, 1866 (aged 35); Aiken, South Carolina
- Burial place: Beaufort, South Carolina
- Relatives: Middleton Stuart Elliott Jr. (nephew)
- Military career
- Allegiance: Confederate States of America
- Branch: Confederate States Army
- Service years: 1861–1865
- Rank: Brigadier General
- Unit: 11th South Carolina Infantry Regiment
- Commands: Holcombe's Legion; Elliott's Brigade, Army of Northern Virginia; Elliott's Brigade, Army of Tennessee
- Conflicts: American Civil War; Battle of Port Royal; Second Battle of Pocotaligo; Battle of the Wilderness; Siege of Petersburg; Battle of the Crater (WIA); Battle of Bentonville
- Other work: State legislator

Stephen Elliott Jr. (October 26, 1830 – February 21, 1866) was a Confederate States Army brigadier general during the American Civil War. He was a planter, state legislator in South Carolina and militia officer before the Civil War and a fisherman after the war. Elliott again was elected to the state legislature after the war but was unable to serve due to his early death.

== Early life ==
Stephen Elliott Jr. was born on October 26, 1830 in Beaufort, South Carolina. Elliott's first immigrant ancestor to America was John Lewis Elliott who was himself the youngest son of famed British Major-General Granville Elliott. Stephen Elliott Jr. was the eldest son of Rev. Stephen Elliott and Ann Hutson Habersham. Rev. Elliott was a large plantation owner as well as a preacher to the Black people of the area.

== Education ==
After studying at Harvard College for a time, he graduated from South Carolina College in 1850. He became a planter on Parris Island, South Carolina. Elliott also served in the South Carolina legislature. He was captain of the Beaufort Volunteer Artillery, a militia company. Elliott also was known for his skill as a yachtsman and a fisherman. In 1854, he married Charlotte Stuart and had three children with her including Henry S. Elliott.

== American Civil War ==
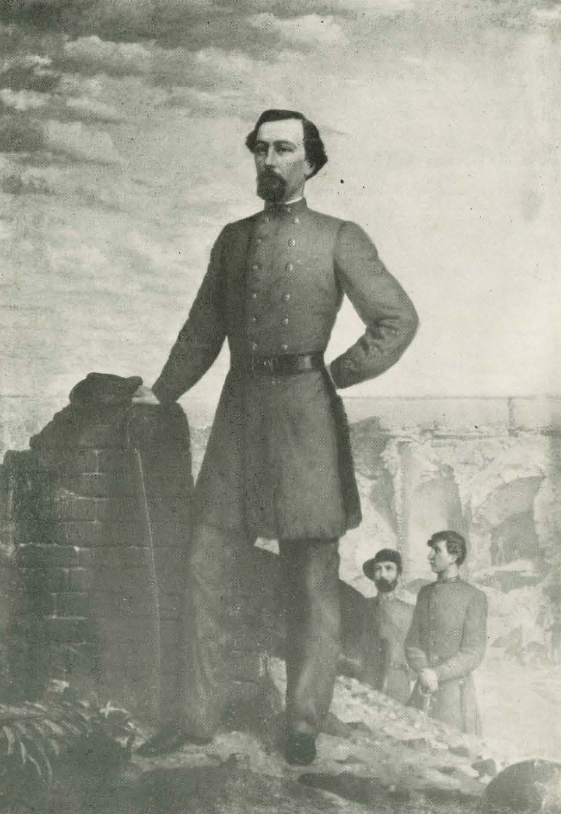
General Elliott in Fort Sumter, after a painting by James Reeve Stuart, veteran of the Beaufort volunteer artillery company and cousin of the general's wife, Charlotte Stuart (1833-1868).

Elliott served in the Confederate States Army within South Carolina from the beginning of the Civil War in 1861 until the spring of 1864, advancing from captain to colonel. In order to participate in the bombardment of Fort Sumter, he attached himself to a different unit than his Beaufort Volunteer Artillery company. The Beaufort Artillery company became an infantry company, so Elliott started his official Confederate Army service as a captain in the 11th South Carolina Volunteer Infantry Regiment. He participated in the defense of Port Royal, South Carolina. He was wounded in the leg at an engagement at Fort Beauregard, South Carolina on November 7, 1861. In August 1862, he was appointed Chief of Artillery for the 3rd military district of South Carolina. He also made some raids against Union targets after the Union Army captured the South Carolina coastal islands, including making attacks with torpedoes. On April 9, 1863, his raiders sank the steamer George Washington. In 1863, he became major and then lieutenant colonel of artillery. For a time in late 1863, he commanded the Confederate force at Fort Sumter, where he received a head wound during the bombardment of Charleston by Union forces on December 11, 1863.

In the spring of 1864, Elliott was in command of Holcombe's Legion. At that time, he was ordered to Petersburg, Virginia with his regiment. He took command of Brigadier General Nathan G. Evans' old brigade in the Army of Northern Virginia following the capture of Brigadier General William S. Walker at the Battle of Ware Bottom Church on May 20. On May 24, 1864, Elliott was promoted to brigadier general. On June 16, 1864, Elliott's brigade counterattacked after a Union Army assault took some advanced Confederate trenches in the Petersburg defenses, establishing a salient in the Confederate line. On July 30, 1864, Elliott's brigade was defending the Confederate line at Elliott's Salient near the spot the Union Army's mine blew, which precipitated the Battle of the Crater. Elliott's brigade had nearly 700 soldiers killed or wounded in the explosion and ensuing battle. Elliott was asleep in a "bombproof" near the line and awakened to find the destruction and chaos surrounding him. Finding no troops nearby since he was close to the site of the explosion, he went to find his remaining men and organize a counterattack in line with a previous plan to deal with such a mine attack. After finding two of his regiments mainly intact, Elliott led them forward, positioning them to defend against an assault and to counterattack. He then impatiently jumped on the parapet to lead his men in the attack. At this moment, Elliott was seriously wounded in the chest and left arm.

After several months recovering from his wounds, which in fact had not healed properly, Elliott joined General Joseph E. Johnston's Army of Tennessee in North Carolina, where he led a brigade of former Charleston defenders and largely untested soldiers. From January 2, 1865, through March 1865, the brigade was in Taliaferro's division of Hardee's corps. For the few remaining weeks of the war, the brigade was in Anderson's division of Stewart's corps.

At the Battle of Bentonville on March 19, 1865, Elliott ordered his brigade to charge the Union left flank when he found that his line overlapped the Union line. The Union skirmish line was surprised and put to flight. The brigade's success did not last as they were broken and sent into retreat when they charged the strong Union main line, which was supported by artillery. At the point where the Confederate retreat halted, in the middle of an artillery barrage, Elliott tried to reform his brigade for another assault, despite receiving a piece of shrapnel in his leg. In the event, Confederate commanders saw that the brigade was too shaken to make another attack and they were ordered simply to kneel or lie down and hold their ground. Elliott had again received another serious wound. His brigade surrendered with Johnston's army at Bennett Place near Durham Station, North Carolina. Elliott had been sent home to convalesce from his latest wound before Johnston's surrender. Although the Eichers found no record of his parole or pardon, in his 1866 eulogy, Trescot noted that he had received a special Executive pardon at the request of Union General Quincy Gillmore, commanding at Hilton Head Island near Elliott's hut.

== Aftermath ==
After the Civil War, Elliott found that his plantation property had been seized for nonpayment of taxes and distributed to his former slaves. They treated him well upon his return but it made it clear that the land no longer belonged to him. Thereafter, he returned to a home in Charleston and a former fishing hut at the seashore, began to make a living as a fisherman and was again elected to the South Carolina legislature. However, he was completely debilitated by his wounds and exposure and died before taking office on February 21, 1866, at Aiken, South Carolina. He was buried in St. Helena's Episcopal Churchyard at Beaufort, South Carolina.

== See also ==
- List of American Civil War generals (Confederate)
