= 76th Pennsylvania Infantry Regiment =

Union Army infantry regiment

76th Pennsylvania Volunteer Infantry
- Active: October 18, 1861, to July 18, 1865
- Country: United States of America
- Allegiance: Union
- Branch: Union Army
- Type: Infantry / Zouaves
- Nickname: "Keystone Zouaves"
- Engagements: Battle of Secessionville; Battle of Pocotaligo; Second Battle of Fort Wagner; Second Battle of Charleston Harbor; Battle of Cold Harbor; Siege of Petersburg; Battle of the Crater; Second Battle of Deep Bottom; Battle of Chaffin's Farm; Battle of Fair Oaks & Darbytown Road; First Battle of Fort Fisher; Second Battle of Fort Fisher; Carolinas campaign Battle of Wilmington

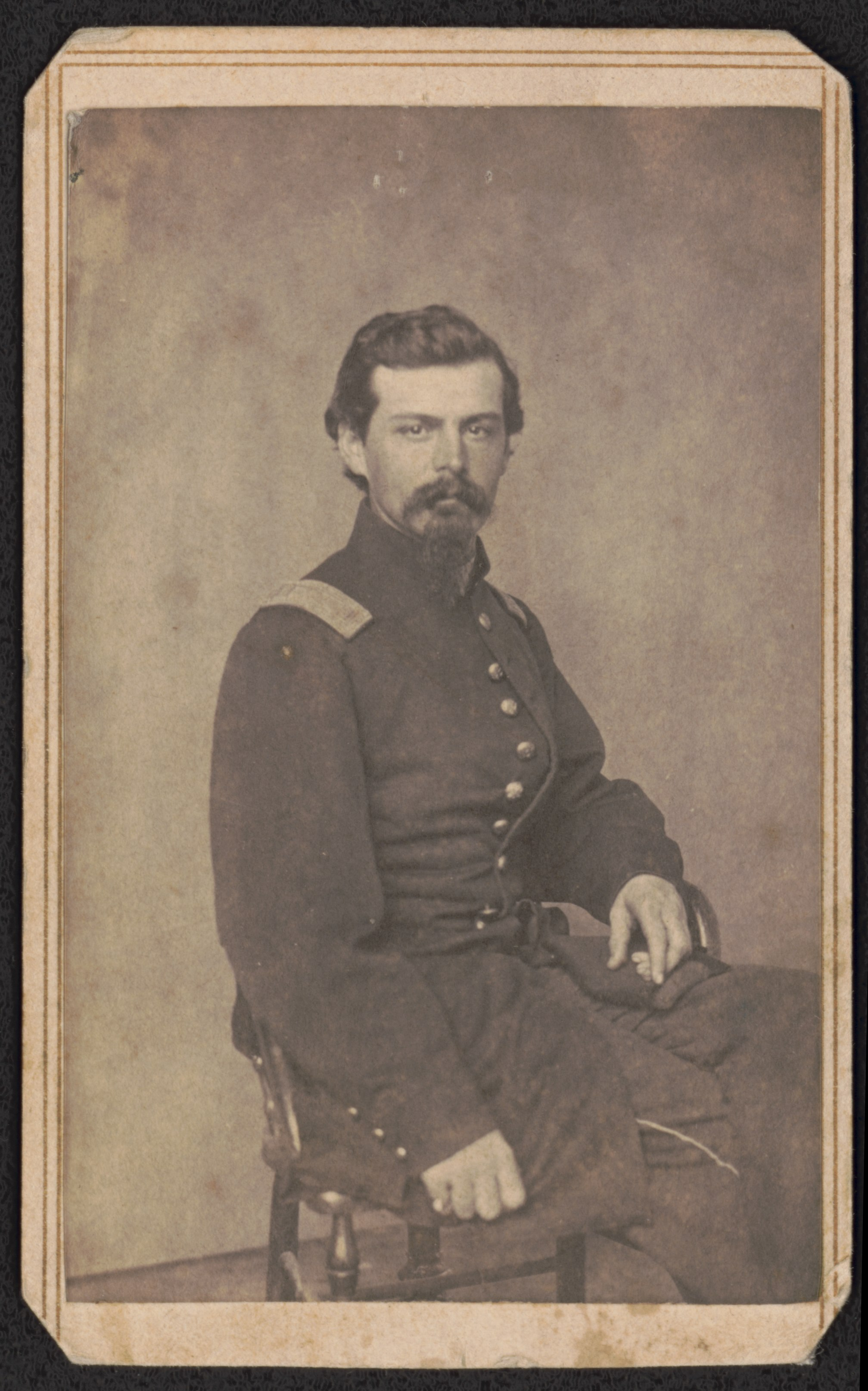
Captain Frank J. Magee of Co. I, 76th Pennsylvania Infantry Regiment. From the Liljenquist Family Collection of Civil War Photographs, Prints and Photographs Division, Library of Congress

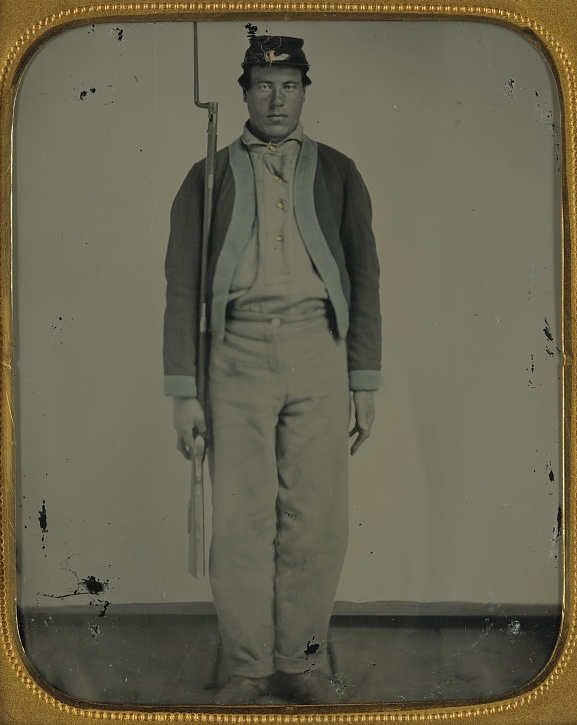
Unidentified soldier of the 76th Pennsylvania Infantry

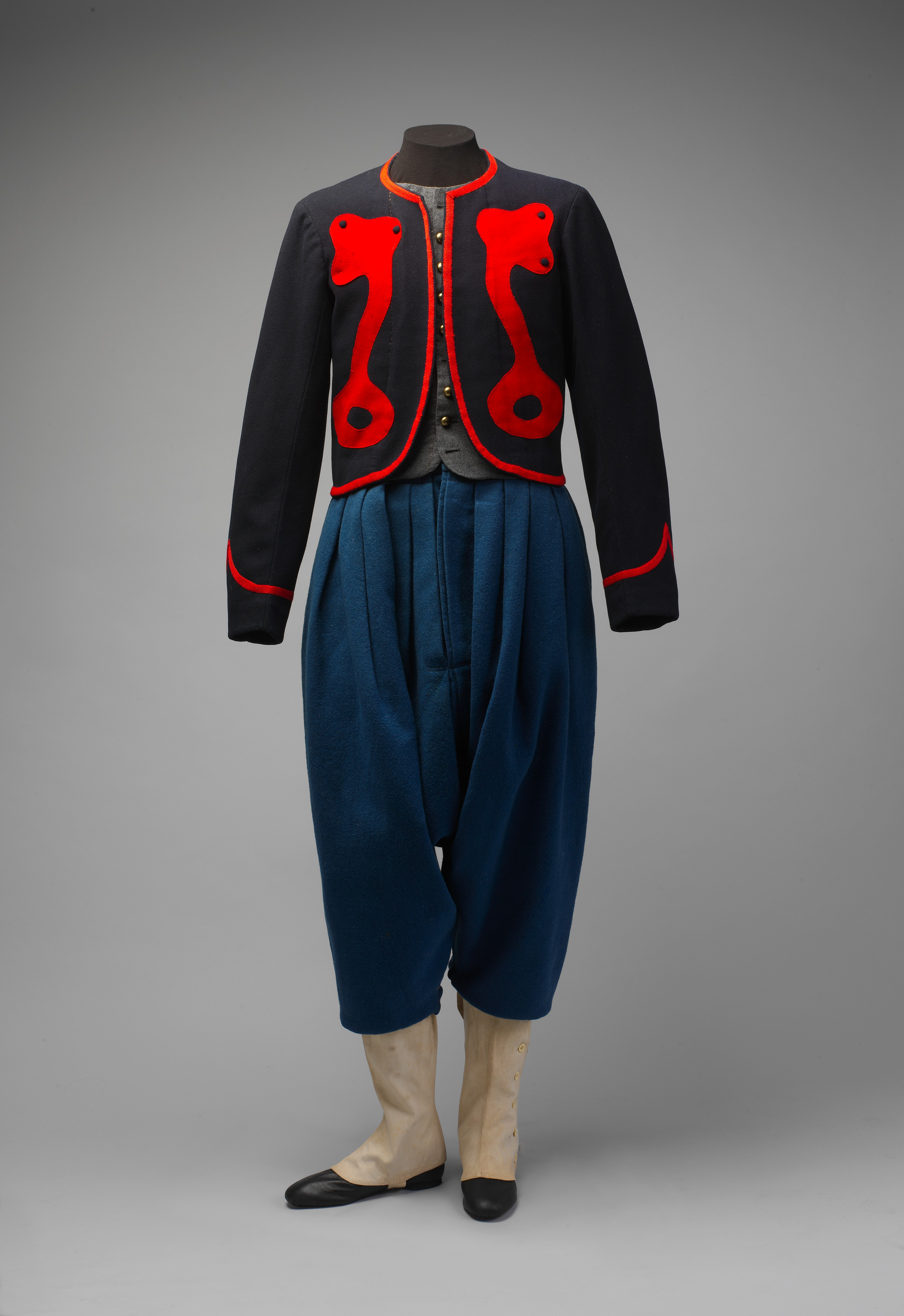
Uniform of the Keystone Zouaves worn by Private Jediah K. Burnham, who joined the Company A of the 76th Regiment, Pennsylvania Volunteer Infantry, in 1863

The 76th Pennsylvania Volunteer Infantry was an infantry regiment that served in the Union Army during the American Civil War.

== Service ==
The 76th Pennsylvania Infantry was organized at Harrisburg, Pennsylvania and mustered on October 18, 1861, for a three-year enlistment under the command of Colonel John M. Power.

The regiment was attached to Wright's 3rd Brigade, Sherman's South Carolina Expedition, to April 1862. 2nd Brigade, 1st Division, Department of the South, to July 1862. District of Hilton Head, South Carolina, X Corps, Department of the South, to April 1863. Guss' Brigade, Seabrook Island, South Carolina, X Corps, to June 1863. 2nd Brigade, Folly Island, South Carolina, X Corps, to July 1863. 2nd Brigade, 2nd Division, Morris Island, South Carolina, X Corps, July 1863. 1st Brigade, Morris Island, South Carolina, X Corps, to August 1863. District of Hilton Head, South Carolina, X Corps, to April 1864. 2nd Brigade, 2nd Division, X Corps, Department of Virginia and North Carolina, to May 1864. 1st Brigade, 3rd Division, XVIII Corps, to June 1864. 2nd Brigade, 2nd Division, X Corps, to December 1864. 2nd Brigade, 2nd Division, XXIV Corps, Department of Virginia, to January 1864. 2nd Brigade, 2nd Division, Terry's Provisional Corps, Department of North Carolina, to March 1865. 2nd Brigade, 2nd Division, X Army Corps, Department of North Carolina, to July 1865.

The 76th Pennsylvania Infantry mustered out July 18, 1865.

== Detailed service ==
Left Pennsylvania for Fort Monroe, Va., October 19. Sherman's Expedition to Port Royal, S.C., October 21-November 7, 1861. Duty at Hilton Head, S.C., until May 30, 1862. Operations on James Island, S.C., June 1–28. Battle of Secessionville, June 16. Evacuation of James Island and movement to Hilton Head June 28-July 7. Duty there until October. Expedition to Pocotaligo, S.C., October 21–23. Frampton's Plantation, Pocotaligo, October 22. Duty at Hilton Head, S.C., until April 1863, and at Seabrook Island until June. Moved to Folly Island, S.C. Attack on Morris Island, S.C., July 10. Assaults on Fort Wagner, Morris Island, July 11 and 18. Siege operations against Fort Wagner until August. Ordered to Hilton Head, S.C., and duty there until April 1864. Moved to Yorktown, Va., April. Butler's operations on south side of the James River and against Petersburg and Richmond May 4–28. Capture of Bermuda Hundred May 5. Waltham Junction, Chester Station, May 6–7. Proctor's Creek and operations against Fort Darling May 12–13. Battle of Drewry's Bluff May 14–16. On Bermuda Hundred front May 17–28. Moved to White House, then to Cold Harbor May 28-June 1. Cold Harbor June 1–12. Before Petersburg June 15–18. Siege operations against Petersburg and Richmond June 16 to December 6. Mine Explosion. Petersburg, July 30, 1864 (reserve). Demonstration on north side of the James River at Deep Bottom August 13–20. Strawberry Plains, Deep Bottom, August 14–18. Battle of Chaffin's Farm, New Market Heights, September 28–30. Battle of Fair Oaks October 27–28. In trenches before Richmond until December 6. Expedition to Fort Fisher, N.C., December 6–24. Second Expedition to Fort Fisher January 3–15, 1865. Assault on and capture of Fort Fisher January 15. Sugar Loaf Battery February 11. Fort Anderson February 18–19. Capture of Wilmington February 22. Advance on Goldsboro March 6–24. Advance on Raleigh April 9–13. Occupation of Raleigh April 14. Bennett's House April 26. Surrender of Johnston and his army. Duty at Raleigh, N.C., until July.

== Casualties ==
The regiment lost a total of 364 men during service; 9 officers and 161 enlisted men killed or mortally wounded, 2 officers and 192 enlisted men died of disease.

== Commanders ==
- Colonel John M. Power - resigned August 9, 1862
- Colonel D. C. Strawbridge - resigned November 20, 1863
- Colonel John Campbell - resigned August 16, 1864
- Colonel John Smith Littell

== See also ==
- List of Pennsylvania Civil War Units
- Pennsylvania in the Civil War
