= William F. Colcock =

American politician

William Ferguson Colcock
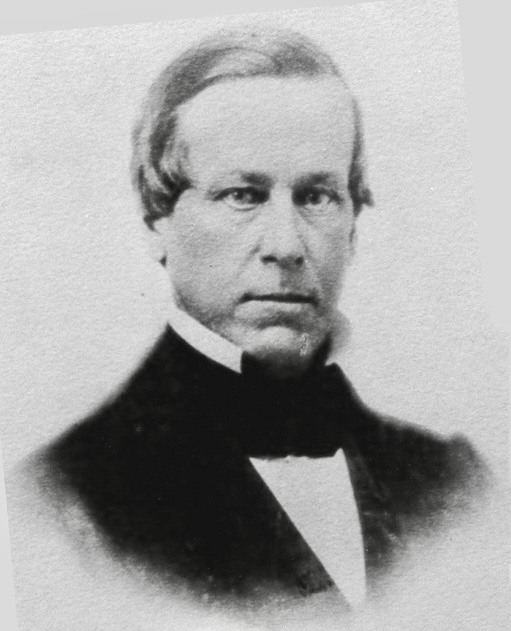

Member of the U.S. House of Representatives from South Carolina's 7th district
- In office March 4, 1849 – March 3, 1853
- Preceded by: Robert B. Rhett
- Succeeded by: District eliminated Edmund W.M. Mackey after district re-established in 1883

20th Speaker of the South Carolina House of Representatives
- In office 1842–1848
- Preceded by: David Wardlaw
- Succeeded by: John I. Middleton

Member of the South Carolina House of Representatives
- In office 1830–1847

Personal details
- Born: November 5, 1804 Beaufort, South Carolina
- Died: June 13, 1889 (aged 84) Washington, D.C.
- Resting place: McPhersonville, South Carolina
- Party: Democratic
- Education: South Carolina College
- Profession: lawyer, planter

William Ferguson Colcock (November 5, 1804 – June 13, 1889) was a U.S. representative from South Carolina.

Born in Beaufort, South Carolina, Colcock attended Hulburt's School, Charleston, South Carolina, and was graduated from South Carolina College (now the University of South Carolina) at Columbia in 1823. He studied law. He was admitted to the bar in 1825 and commenced practice in Coosawhatchie, South Carolina. He was a known plantation owner who enforce the laws and benefits of slavery.This of course meant becoming wealthy off the labor of forced labor from Africans shipped from the shores and those born in the US. He served as member of the State house of representatives 1830–1847.

Colcock was elected as a Democrat to the Thirty-first and Thirty-second Congresses (March 4, 1849 – March 3, 1853). He was a Regent of the Smithsonian Institution 1850–1853. He served as collector of the port of Charleston 1853–1865, serving first under the United States Government and subsequently under the Confederate States Government. He served as delegate to the Democratic National Convention at Charleston in 1860. He resumed the practice of law. He died in McPhersonville, Hampton County, South Carolina, on June 13, 1889. He was interred in Stoney Creek Cemetery, South Carolina. 1860 census shows he owned 181 slaves in St. Luke’s Parish.

== Sources ==
- United States Congress. "William F. Colcock (id: C000603)". Biographical Directory of the United States Congress.

U.S. House of Representatives
| Preceded by Robert B. Rhett | Member of the U.S. House of Representatives from South Carolina's 7th congressional district 1849–1853 | Succeeded by District eliminated in 1853 |
