= USS Norwich =

Gunboat of the United States Navy

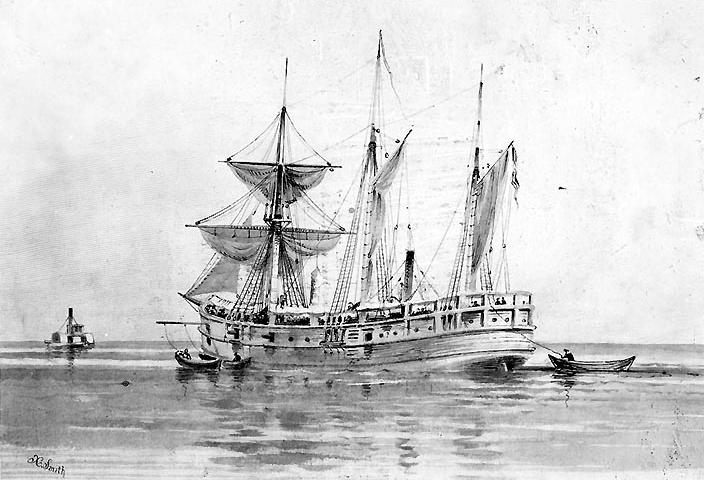
- Artwork of the USS Norwich made during the Civil War by Xanthus Russell Smith

History

United States
- Name: USS Norwich
- Laid down: 1861
- Acquired: by purchase, 26 September 1861
- Commissioned: 28 December 1861
- Decommissioned: 30 June 1865
- Fate: Sold, 10 August 1865; Lost, 17 February 1873

General characteristics
- Type: Screw steamer
- Displacement: 450 long tons (457 t)
- Length: 132 ft 5 in (40.36 m)
- Beam: 24 ft 6 in (7.47 m)
- Draft: 10 ft (3.0 m)
- Depth of hold: 16 ft 5 in (5.00 m)
- Propulsion: Steam engine
- Speed: 9.5 knots (17.6 km/h; 10.9 mph)
- Armament: 1 × 30-pounder Parrott rifle; 4 × 8 in (200 mm) guns

USS Norwich, a wooden, screw steamer built at Norwich, Connecticut in 1861, was purchased by the Union Navy at New York City 26 September 1861 from J. M. Huntington & Co.; and commissioned at the New York Navy Yard 28 December 1861, Lieutenant James M. Duncan in command.

== Service history ==
Norwich got underway 2 January 1862 for Port Royal, South Carolina where she joined the South Atlantic Blockading Squadron. She was stationed off Savannah, Georgia and blockaded that important port during the following two months.

On 10 March 1863, she and USS Uncas escorted troop transports up St. Johns River and shelled Confederate positions defending Jacksonville, Florida, clearing the way for Union Army landings. After destroying much of the city, Union forces evacuated the Jacksonville area late in the month. On 19 August, a boat expedition from Norwich and USS Hale destroyed a Confederate signal station near Jacksonville.

Early in February 1864, Major General Quincy A. Gillmore advised Rear Admiral John A. Dahlgren of his intention "... to throw a force into Florida on the west bank of St. Johns River." He requested the support of two or three naval gunboats for the operation. Dahlgren promptly detailed steamers Ottawa and Norwich to convoy the Army troops to Jacksonville and ordered screw steamer USS Dai Ching and side wheelers USS Mahaska and USS Water Witch up the St. Johns. The Admiral himself went to Florida to take a personal hand in directing his forces to "... keep open the communications by the river and give any assistance to the troops which operations may need." With the gunboats deployed according to Dahlgren's instructions, the soldiers, under Brigadier General Truman Seymour, landed at Jacksonville, moved inland, captured fieldpieces and took a large quantity of cotton. On 7 February, Norwich trapped blockade runner St. Mary's in Me Girt's Creek, above Jacksonville where she was scuttled and her cargo of cotton destroyed to prevent capture.

A strong Confederate counterattack commenced on 20 February and compelled the Union troops to fall back on Jacksonville where the gunboats stood by to defend the city. Naval howitzers were put ashore in battery, manned by seamen. Commander George Balch, senior naval officer present, reported: "I had abundant reasons to believe that to the naval force must our troops be indebted for protection against a greatly superior force flushed with victory." Seymour expressed his appreciation for Balch's quick action "... at a moment when it appeared probable that the vigorous assistance of the force under your command would be necessary."

Norwich continued to perform blockade duty along the coast and in the rivers of Florida and Georgia through the end of the Civil War. She decommissioned at Philadelphia 30 June 1865 and was sold at public auction there 10 August 1865. Redocumented 14 October 1865, as SS Norwich she remained in merchant service until lost at sea on 17 February 1873.
