= 50th Pennsylvania Infantry Regiment =

Union Army infantry regiment

50th Regiment Pennsylvania Volunteer Infantry
- Active: October 1, 1861 – July 30, 1865
- Country: United States of America
- Allegiance: Union
- Branch: Infantry
- Engagements: First Battle of Pocotaligo; Battle of Groveton; Second Battle of Bull Run; Battle of Chantilly; Battle of South Mountain; Battle of Antietam; Battle of Fredericksburg; Siege of Vicksburg; Jackson Expedition; Knoxville Campaign; Battle of the Wilderness; Battle of Spotsylvania Court House; Battle of North Anna; Battle of Totopotomoy Creek; Battle of Cold Harbor; Siege of Petersburg; Battle of the Crater; Battle of Globe Tavern; Battle of Peebles' Farm; Battle of Boydton Plank Road; Battle of Fort Stedman; Appomattox Campaign; Third Battle of Petersburg

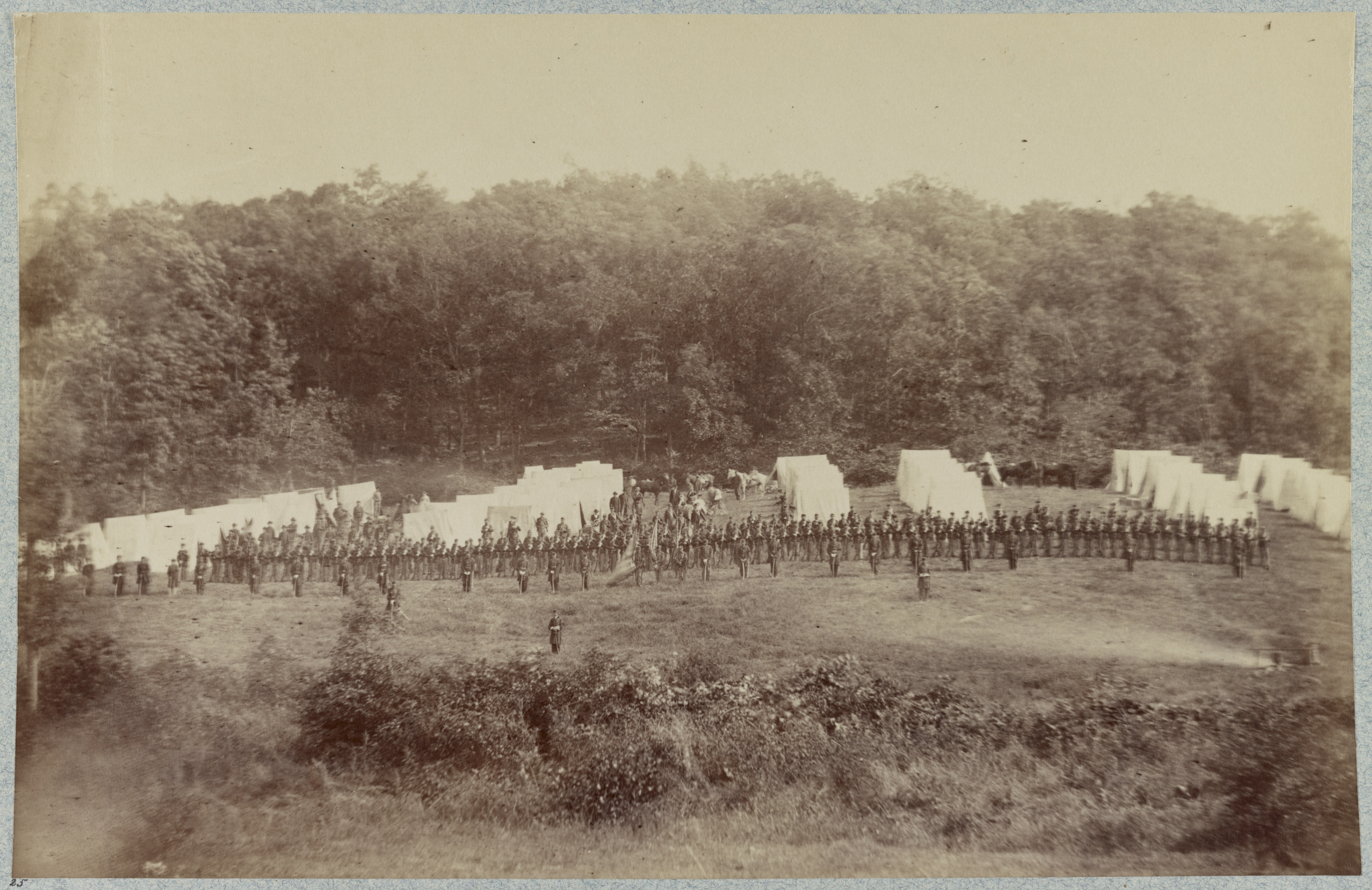
The 50th Pennsylvania Infantry in Gettysburg, Pennsylvania, in July 1865

The 50th Regiment Pennsylvania Volunteer Infantry was an infantry regiment that served in the Union Army during the American Civil War.

== Service ==
The 50th Pennsylvania Infantry was organized in Harrisburg, Pennsylvania and mustered in October 1, 1861 for a three-year enlistment under the command of Colonel Benjamin C. Christ. The regiment was initially armed with Model 1816 flintlock muskets converted to percussion, within a few months they were replaced with .54 caliber Austrian Lorenz Rifles. In 1863, the 50th Pennsylvania were forced to replace them with Model 1861 Springfield rifles due to logistics reasons (the regiment was the only one in the IX Corps that required .54 caliber ammunition). The soldiers were unhappy with this as they considered the Lorenz rifles a more-than-adequate weapon that also weighed less than the Springfield rifle.

The regiment was attached to Stevens' Brigade, W. T. Sherman's South Carolina Expedition, to April 1862. District of Beaufort, South Carolina, Department of the South, to July 1862. 1st Brigade, 1st Division, IX Corps, Army of the Potomac, to September 1862. 2nd Brigade, 1st Division, IX Corps, Army of the Potomac, to April 1863, and Army of the Ohio to June 1863. 3rd Brigade, 2nd Division, IX Corps, Army of the Tennessee, to August 1863. 2nd Brigade, 1st Division, IX Corps, Army of the Ohio, to April 1864. 2nd Brigade, 3rd Division, IX Corps, Army of the Potomac, to September 1864. 2nd Brigade, 1st Division, Army of the Potomac, to July 1865.

The 50th Pennsylvania Infantry mustered out July 31, 1865.

== Detailed service ==
Left Pennsylvania for Washington, D.C., October 2, 1861, then moved to Annapolis, Md., October 9. Sherman's expedition to Port Royal, S.C. October 21-November 7, 1861. Sailed on the steamer Winfield Scott and shipwrecked off the coast of North Carolina. Occupation of Beaufort, S.C., December 6. Port Royal Ferry, Coosaw River, January 1, 1862. Duty at Port Royal Island, S.C., until July 1862. Barnwell's Island, S.C., February 10 (Company D). Pocotaligo May 29. Camp Stevens June 7. Moved to Hilton Head, S.C., then to Newport News, Va., July 14–18, then to Aquia Creek and Fredericksburg, Va., August 3–6. Operations in support of Pope August 6–16. Pope's campaign in northern Virginia August 16-September 2. Sulphur Springs August 24. Battle of Groveton August 29. Second Battle of Bull Run August 30. Battle of Chantilly September 1. Maryland Campaign September 6–24. Battle of South Mountain, Md., September 14. Battle of Antietam September 16–17. March to Pleasant Valley September 19-October 2, and duty there until October 25. Movement to Falmouth, Va., October 25-November 19. Battle of Fredericksburg December 12–15. Burnside's 2nd Campaign January 20–24, 1863. At Falmouth until February 12. Moved to Newport News February 12–14, then to Kentucky March 21–26. Duty at Paris, Ky., until April 27. Moved to Nicholasville, Lancaster, and Stanford April 27–29, then to Somerset May 6–8, then through Kentucky to Cairo, Ill., June 4–10, and to Vicksburg, Miss., June 14–17. Siege of Vicksburg, Miss., June 17-July 4. Advance on Jackson, Miss., July 5–10. Siege of Jackson July 10–17. At Milldale until August 12. Moved to Covington, Ky., August 12–23. Burnside's campaign in eastern Tennessee August to October. Action at Blue Springs, Tenn., October 10. Clinch Mountain October 27. Knoxville Campaign November 4-December 23. Campbell's Station November 16. Siege of Knoxville November 17-December 5. Pursuit of Longstreet's army to Blain's Cross Roads December 5–26. Reenlisted at Blain's Cross Roads January 1, 1864. Moved to Annapolis, Md., April 1864. Rapidan Campaign May 4-June 12. Battle of the Wilderness May 5–7. Spotsylvania May 8–12. Ny River May 9. Spotsylvania Court House May 12–21. Assault on the Salient May 12. North Anna River May 23–26. Ox Ford May 24. Line of the Pamunkey May 26–28. Totopotomoy May 28–31. Cold Harbor June 1–12. Bethesda Church June 1–3. Before Petersburg June 16–18. Siege of Petersburg June 16, 1864 to April 2, 1865. Mine Explosion, Petersburg, July 30, 1864. Weldon Railroad August 18–21. Poplar Springs Church or Peebles' Farm September 29-October 2. Reconnaissance on Vaughan or Squirrel Level Road October 8. Boydton Plank Road, Hatcher's Run, October 27–28. Fort Stedman March 25, 1865. Appomattox Campaign March 28-April 9. Assault on and fall of Petersburg April 2. Pursuit of Lee to Burkesville April 3–9. Moved to City Point, then to Washington, D.C., April 21–28. Grand Review of the Armies May 23.

== Casualties ==
The regiment lost a total of 348 men during service; 8 officers and 156 enlisted men killed or mortally wounded, 4 officers and 180 enlisted men died of disease.

== Commanders ==
- Colonel Benjamin C. Christ - promoted to brevet brigadier general August 1, 1864
- Colonel William H. Telford
- Lieutenant Colonel Thomas S. Brenholtz - commanded at the Second Battle of Bull Run until wounded in action
- Major Edward Overton, Jr. - commanded at the Second Battle of Bull Run after Ltc Brenholtz was wounded; commanded at the Battle of Antietam until wounded in action
- Major Samuel K. Schwenk - commanded at the Battle of Fort Stedman
- Captain William H. Diehl - commanded at the Battle of Antietam after Maj Overton was wounded

== Notable members ==
- Sergeant Charles Brown, Company C - Medal of Honor recipient for action at the Battle of Globe Tavern
- Corporal Henry Hill, Company C - Medal of Honor recipient for action at the Battle of the Wilderness

== See also ==
- List of Pennsylvania Civil War Units
- Pennsylvania in the Civil War
