= 3rd Rhode Island Heavy Artillery Regiment =

- Active: December 19, 1861 - August 27, 1865
- Country: United States
- Allegiance: Union
- Branch: Heavy artillery
- Type: Regiment
- Size: 12 companies
- Engagements: American Civil War: Second Battle of Charleston Harbor; Battle of Gainesville (detachment); Battle of Honey Hill

3rd Rhode Island Heavy Artillery Regiment was a heavy artillery regiment that served in the Union Army during the American Civil War.

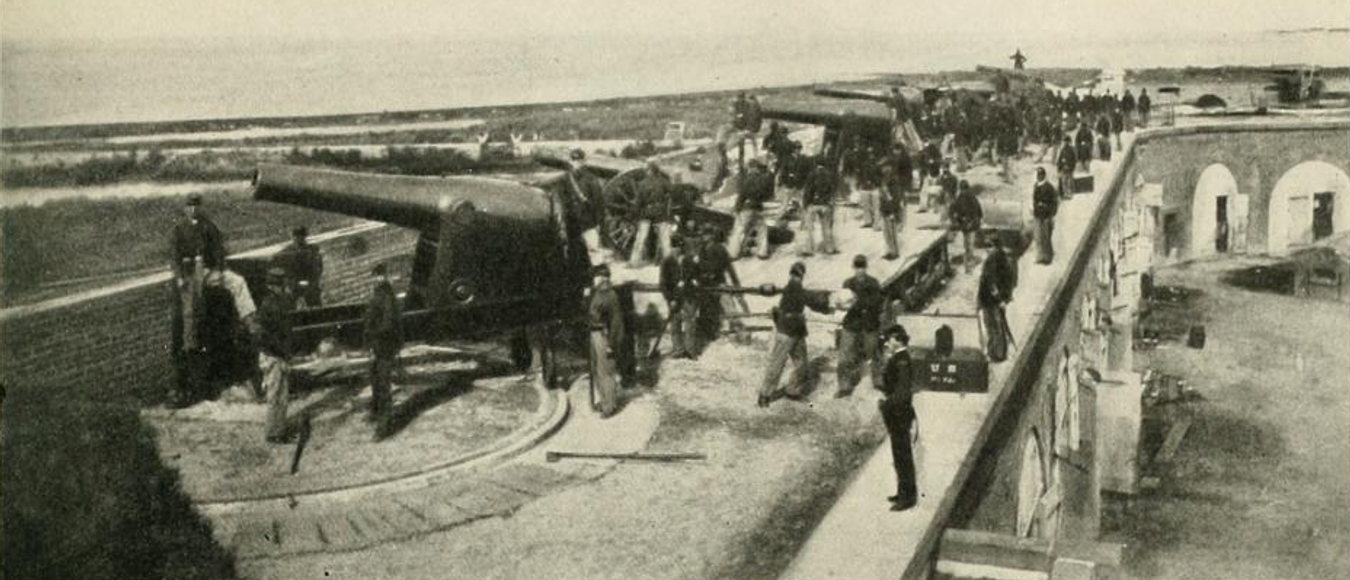
The 3rd Rhode Island Heavy Artillery at drill in the captured and repaired Fort Pulaski, Georgia in 1863.

== History ==
The 3rd Rhode Island Heavy Artillery Regiment was initially organized in Providence, Rhode Island as the 3rd Rhode Island Infantry Regiment in August 1861. It was officially changed to heavy artillery on December 19, 1861 at Hilton Head, South Carolina. It consisted of 12 batteries designated 'A' through to 'M'. The regiment was the largest unit fielded by Rhode Island during the war, with more than 2,000 men serving in it during the period of its existence, drawing its recruits from the settlements of Providence, Warwick and Pawtucket. It served in a variety of roles, including as both light and heavy artillery, engineers, infantry and cavalry, as well as manning US Navy gunboats. The regiment fought in battles in Virginia, South Carolina, Georgia and Florida. The 3rd Rhode Island Heavy Artillery's term of service ended on August 27, 1865.

== Battle honors ==
The 3rd Rhode Island Heavy Artillery received the following battle honors for its service during the war:

- Fort Pulaski, Secessionville, Pocotoligo, Laurel Hill, Fort Sumter, Fort Wagner, Fort Burham, Deveaux Neck, Honey Hill, Olustee, Drury's Bluff, and Petersburg.

== Company A ==
Company A, 3rd Rhode Island Heavy Artillery
- Active: December 19, 1861 - August 27, 1865
- Country: United States
- Allegiance: Union
- Branch: Heavy artillery
- Engagements: Second Battle of Charleston Harbor; Battle of Gainesville (detachment); Battle of Honey Hill

=== Service ===
Company A, 3rd Rhode Island Heavy Artillery was initially organized in Providence, Rhode Island as the 3rd Rhode Island Infantry in August 1861. It was officially changed to heavy artillery on December 19, 1861 at Hilton Head, South Carolina.

The company was attached to Sherman's Expeditionary Corps to April 1862. 3rd Brigade, 1st Division, Department of the South, to July 1862. U.S. Forces Hilton Head, South Carolina, Department of the South, to September 1862. U.S. Forces Hilton Head, South Carolina, X Corps, Department of the South, to January 1863. District of Beaufort, South Carolina, X Corps, to November 1863. Morris Island, South Carolina, X Corps, Department of the South, to December 1863. Folly Island, South Carolina, X Corps, to January 1864. District of Hilton Head, South Carolina, X Corps, to April 1864. District of Florida, Department of the South, to October 1864. District of Beaufort, South Carolina, 2nd Separate Brigade, Department of the South, to November 1864. Artillery Brigade, Coast Division, Department of the South, to January 1865. District of Beaufort, South Carolina, 2nd Separate Brigade, Department of the South, and Department of South Carolina, to August 1865.

Company A, 3rd Rhode Island Heavy Artillery mustered out of service August 27, 1865.

=== Detailed service ===
Duty at Hilton Head, S.C., until January 1863. Action at Whitmarsh and Wilmington Islands April 16, 1862. At Beaufort, S.C., until November 1863. Moved to Morris Island, S.C., November 14–16, and operations against Charleston, S.C., from Morris and Folly Islands, until December 1863. Moved to Hilton Head, S.C., and duty there until April 1864. Moved to Jacksonville, Fla., and duty there until October 1864. Expedition from Jacksonville to Finnegan's Camp May 25. Cedar Creek May 25. Expedition from Jacksonville to Camp Milton May 31-June 3. Expedition to Baldwin July 23–28. South Fork Black Creek July 24. Near Whitesides July 27. Raid on Florida Railroad August 15–19. Engagement at Gainesville August 17. Moved to Beaufort, S.C., October, and duty there until November 29. Expedition to Boyd's Neck November 29–30. Battle of Honey Hill November 30. Demonstration on Charleston & Savannah Railroad December 6–9. Deveaux Neck December 6 and December 27. Duty at Beaufort, S.C., until May 1865, and in Department of the South until August 1865.

=== Casualties ===
Individual company losses are not available, but the regiment's losses (all 12 companies) are reported as a total of 135 men during service; 2 officers and 39 enlisted men killed or mortally wounded, 4 officers and 90 enlisted men died of disease.

=== Commanders ===
- Captain William H. Hammer
- Captain Martin S. James
- Captain George S. Smith

=== Legacy ===
A Sons of Veterans Reserve (SVR) unit in Rhode Island is named Company A, 3rd Rhode Island Heavy Artillery. The SVR is the uniformed division of the Sons of Union Veterans of the Civil War.

== Company B ==
Company B, 3rd Rhode Island Heavy Artillery
- Active: December 19, 1861 - August 27, 1865
- Country: United States
- Allegiance: Union
- Branch: Heavy artillery
- Engagements: Battle of Fort Pulaski; Battle of Secessionville; First Battle of Fort Wagner; Second Battle of Fort Wagner

=== Service ===
Company B, 3rd Rhode Island Heavy Artillery was initially organized in Providence, Rhode Island as the 3rd Rhode Island Infantry in August 1861. It was officially changed to heavy artillery on December 19, 1861 at Hilton Head, South Carolina.

The company was attached to Sherman's Expeditionary Corps to April 1862. 3rd Brigade, 1st Division, Department of the South, to July 1862. U.S. Forces, Hilton Head, South Carolina, Department of the South to September 1862. U.S. Forces, Hilton Head, South Carolina, X Corps, Department of the South, to July 1863. U. S. Forces, Morris Island, South Carolina, X Corps, Department of the South, to March 1864. District of Hilton Head, South Carolina, Department of the South, to October 1864. Morris Island, South Carolina, Northern District, Department of the South, 1st Separate Brigade to August 1865.

Company B, 3rd Rhode Island Heavy Artillery mustered out of service August 27, 1865.

=== Detailed service ===
Duty at Hilton Head, S.C., until February 1862. Operations against Fort Pulaski, Ga., February 21-April 10. Bombardment and capture of Fort Pulaski April 9–10. At Hilton Head until May 23. Moved to Edisto Island, S.C., May 23. Operations on James Island, S.C., June 1–28. Action on James Island June 10. Battle of Secessionville June 16. Moved to Hilton Head S.C., June 28-July 1, and duty there until July 1863. Assaults on Fort Wagner, Morris Island, July 11 and 18. Siege of Fort Wagner, Morris Island, July 18-September 7. Capture of Forts Wagner and Gregg September 7. Operations against Fort Sumter and Charleston until March 1864. Duty at Hilton Head, S.C., until October 1864. Operations against Charleston from Morris Island, S.C., until February 1865. Duty at Sullivan's Island, S.C., and in the Department of South Carolina until August.

=== Casualties ===
Individual battery losses are not available, but the regiment's losses (all 12 batteries) are reported as a total of 135 men during service; 2 officers and 39 enlisted men killed or mortally wounded, 4 officers and 90 enlisted men died of disease.

=== Commanders ===
- Captain Augustus Colwell
- Captain Albert E. Greene
- Captain Sibeus C. Tortellot

== Company C ==
Company C, 3rd Rhode Island Heavy Artillery
- Active: December 19, 1861 - June 9, 1865
- Country: United States
- Allegiance: Union
- Branch: Heavy artillery
- Engagements: Battle of Secessionville; First Battle of Fort Wagner; Battle of Olustee; Bermuda Hundred Campaign; Siege of Petersburg; Second Battle of Deep Bottom; Battle of Chaffin's Farm; Battle of Darbytown and New Market Roads; Third Battle of Petersburg

=== Service ===
The company was attached to Sherman's Expeditionary Corps to April 1862. 3rd Brigade, 1st Division, Department of the South, to July 1862. U.S. Forces, Hilton Head, South Carolina, Department of the South, to September 1862. U.S. Forces, Hilton Head, South Carolina, X Corps, Department of the South, to January 1863. District of Beaufort, South Carolina, X Corps, to June 1863. St. Helena Island, South Carolina, X Corps, to July 1863. U.S. Forces, Morris Island, South Carolina, X Corps, to October 1863. Artillery, Gordon's Division, Folly Island, South Carolina, X Corps, to December 1863. District of Hilton Head, South Carolina, X Corps, to February 1864. Artillery, District of Florida, Department of the South, to April 1864. Artillery, 3rd Division, X Corps, Department of Virginia and North Carolina, to May 1864. Unattached artillery, X Corps, Department of Virginia and North Carolina, to June 1864. Artillery 1st Division, X Corps, Department of Virginia and North Carolina, to August 1864. Artillery Brigade, X Corps, Department of Virginia and North Carolina, to December 1864. Artillery Brigade, XXV Corps, Department of Virginia, to June 1865.

Company C, 3rd Rhode Island Heavy Artillery mustered out of service June 9, 1865.

=== Detailed service ===
Action at Port Royal Ferry, S.C., December 29, 1861. Venus Point February 15, 1862. Moved to Edisto Island, S.C., April 5. Operations on James Island, S.C., June 1–28. Action James Island June 10. Battle of Secessionville June 16. Moved to Hilton Head, S.C., June 28-July 1, and duty there until October. Expedition to Pocotaligo, S.C., October 21–23. Action at Caston and Frampton's Plantation, near Pocotaligo, October 22. Coosawhatchie October 22. At Hilton Head, S.C., until January 1863, and at Beaufort, S.C., until June 1863. Broad River April 8. Port Royal Ferry April 9. Combahee River June 1. Combahee Ferry June 2. Expedition to Darien June 5–24. Moved to St. Helena Island, S.C., then to Folly Island, S.C., July 4–5. Attack on Morris Island, S.C., July 10. Operations against Forts Wagner and Gregg and against Fort Sumter and Charleston, S.C., until December. Capture of Forts Wagner and Gregg September 7. Moved to Hilton Head, S.C., and duty there until February 1864. Expedition to Jacksonville, Fla., February 5–7, and to Lake City February 7–22. Battle of Olustee February 20. Occupation of Palatka March 10. Duty at Jacksonville until April 30. Moved to Yorktown, Va., April 30. Butler's operations on south side of James River and against Petersburg and Richmond May 5-June 15. Operations against Fort Darling May 12–16. Battle of Drewry's Bluff May 14–16. On Bermuda Hundred front May 17-June 15. Appomattox River May 28–31 and June 5. Before Petersburg June 15–19. Siege of Petersburg and Richmond June 16, 1864 to April 2, 1865. Demonstration on north side of the James August 13–20, 1864. Strawberry Plains, Deep Bottom, August 14–18. Laurel Hill August 17. Chaffin's Farm September 28–30. Darbytown and New Market Roads October 7. Fort Burnham December 10 and January 24, 1865. Fall of Petersburg and Richmond April 2–3. Duty in the Department of Virginia until June.

=== Commanders ===
- Captain Joseph J. Comstock, Jr.
- Captain James S. Martin
- Captain Peter J. Turner
- Lieutenant Henry H. Metcalf - commanded at the battle of Olustee

== Company D ==
Company D, 3rd Rhode Island Heavy Artillery
- Active: December 19, 1861 - October 4, 1864; March 10, 1865 - August 27, 1865
- Country: United States
- Allegiance: Union
- Type: Heavy artillery
- Engagements: First Battle of Fort Wagner; Second Battle of Fort Wagner

=== Service ===
The company was attached to Sherman's Expeditionary Corps, to April 1862. 3rd Brigade, 1st Division, Department of the South, to July 1862. District of Hilton Head, South Carolina, Department of the South, to September 1862. District Hilton Head, South Carolina, X Corps, Department of the South, to April 1863. U.S. Forces, Folly Island, South Carolina, X Corps, Department of the South, to July 1863. U.S. Forces, Morris Island, South Carolina, X Corps, Department of the South, to March 1864. Fort Pulaski, Georgia, District Hilton Head, South Carolina, Department of the South, to October 1864. After the batter was mustered out and recreated in 1865, it was attached to 1st Separate Brigade, Morris Island, South Carolina, Northern District, Department of the South, and duty on Morris Island, and in the Department of the South, until August 1865.

Company D, 3rd Rhode Island Heavy Artillery mustered out of service October 4, 1864 at Providence, Rhode Island. On March 10, 1865, a new Company D, 3rd Rhode Island Heavy Artillery was created by consolidation of several other batteries to form a battalion. It mustered out of service on August 27, 1865.

=== Detailed service ===
Duty at Hilton Head, S.C., until April 1863. Expedition to Stono Inlet April 2–11, 1862. Moved to Folly Island, S.C., April 1863, and duty there until July 1863. Attack on Morris Island July 10. Assaults on Fort Wagner, Morris Island, S.C., July 11 and 18. Siege operations against Forts Wagner and Gregg, Morris Island, and against Charleston until March 1864. Capture of Forts Wagner and Gregg September 7, 1863. Moved to Fort Pulaski, Ga., March 18, 1864, and garrison duty there until September. Moved to Hilton Head, S.C., then to New York and Providence September 26–30.

=== Commanders ===
- Captain John M. Barker
- Captain George L. Smith

== Company E ==
Company E, 3rd Rhode Island Heavy Artillery
- Active: December 19, 1861 - October 4, 1864
- Country: United States
- Allegiance: Union
- Branch: Heavy artillery
- Engagements: Battle of Secessionville

=== Service ===
The company was attached to Sherman's Expeditionary Corps to April 1862. 3rd Brigade, 1st Division, Department of the South, to July 1862. District of Hilton Head, South Carolina, Department of the South, to September 1862. District of Hilton Head, South Carolina, X Corps, Department of the South, to November 1863. Morris Island, South Carolina, X Corps, Department of the South, to April 1864. Morris Island, South Carolina, Northern District, Department of the South, to October 1864.

Company E, 3rd Rhode Island Heavy Artillery mustered out of service October 4, 1864 at Providence, Rhode Island.

=== Detailed service ===
Duty at Hilton Head, S.C., until May 1862. Whitmarsh and Wilmington Islands April 16. Moved to Edisto Island, S.C., May 23. Operations on James Island, S.C., June 1–28. Action on James Island June 10. Battle of Secessionville June 16. Moved to Hilton Head, S.C., June 28-July 1, and duty there until November 1863. Expedition to Pocotaligo, S.C., October 21–23, 1862. Actions at Caston's and Frampton's Plantations near Pocotaligo and Coosawhatchie River October 22, 1862. Ordered to Morris Island, S.C., November 1863, and duty there operating against Fort Sumter and Charleston, S.C., until September 1864. Actions on James Island, S.C., July 1–2, and Fort Johnson July 3. Moved to Hilton Head, S.C., then to New York and Providence September 26–30.

=== Commanders ===
- Captain John D. Eldredge
- Captain Martin S. James
- Captain G. W. Knorring
- Captain Peter J. Turner

== Company F ==
Company F, 3rd Rhode Island Heavy Artillery
- Active: December 19, 1861 - October 4, 1864
- Country: United States
- Allegiance: Union
- Branch: Heavy artillery
- Engagements: Battle of Fort Pulaski; Battle of Secessionville

=== Service ===
The company was attached to Sherman's Expeditionary Corps to April 1862. 3rd Brigade, 1st Division, Department of the South, to July 1862. District of Hilton Head, South Carolina, Department of the South, to September 1862. District of Hilton Head, South Carolina, X Corps, Department of the South, to December 1863. Tybee Island, South Carolina, X Corps, to March 1864. Morris Island, South Carolina, Northern District, Department of the South, to September 1864.

Company F, 3rd Rhode Island Heavy Artillery mustered out of service October 4, 1864 at Providence, Rhode Island.

=== Detailed service ===
Duty at Hilton Head, S.C., until February 1862. Operations against Fort Pulaski, Ga., February 21-April 10. Bombardment and capture of Fort Pulaski April 9–10. Moved to Hilton Head, then to Edisto Island, S.C., May 23. Operations on James Island, S.C., June 1–28. Action on James Island June 10. Battle of Secessionville June 16. Moved to Hilton Head, S.C., June 28-July 1, and duty there until December 1863. Moved to Tybee Island, S.C., December 1863, and duty there until March 1864. Moved to Morris Island, S.C., March 18, and duty there operating against Fort Sumter and Charleston until September. Actions on James Island July 1–2, and at Fort Johnson July 3. Moved to Hilton Head, S.C., then to New York and Providence September 26–30.

=== Commanders ===
- Captain Augustus Colwell
- Captain Pardon Mason
- Captain Horatio N. Perry

== Company G ==
Company G, 3rd Rhode Island Heavy Artillery
- Active: December 19, 1861 - October 4, 1864
- Country: United States
- Allegiance: Union
- Branch: Heavy artillery

=== Service ===
The company was attached to Sherman's Expeditionary Corps to April 1862. District of Hilton Head, South Carolina, Department of the South, to May 1862. Garrison Fort Pulaski, Georgia, to September 1862. Fort Pulaski, Georgia, District of Hilton Head, South Carolina, X Corps, Department of the South, to April 1864. Tybee Island, District of Hilton Head, South Carolina, Department of the South, to September 1864.

Company G, 3rd Rhode Island Heavy Artillery mustered out of service October 4, 1864 at Providence, Rhode Island.

=== Detailed service ===
Duty at Hilton Head, S.C., until May 1862. Assigned to duty at Fort Pulaski, Ga., as garrison, May 1862 to March 1864. Near Bluffton August 29, 1862. Affair on Skull Creek September 24, 1862. Reconnaissance on May and Savannah Rivers September 30-October 3, 1862. Affair Kirk's Bluff October 18. Expedition to Pocotaligo October 21–22, 1862. Actions at Caston and Frampton's Plantations and Coosawhatchie River October 22. Moved to Tybee Island March 18, 1864, and duty there until September. Moved to Hilton Head, then to New York and Providence September 26–30.

=== Commanders ===
- Captain Jeremiah Lannahan
- Captain George L. Smith

== Company H ==
Company H, 3rd Rhode Island Heavy Artillery
- Active: December 19, 1861 - October 4, 1864
- Country: United States
- Allegiance: Union
- Branch: Heavy artillery
- Engagements: Battle of Fort Pulaski; Battle of Secessionville; First Battle of Fort Wagner; Second Battle of Fort Wagner

=== Service ===
The company was attached to Sherman's Expeditionary Corps to April 1862. 3rd Brigade, 1st Division, Department of the South, to July 1862. District of Hilton Head, South Carolina, Department of the South, to September 1862. District of Hilton Head, South Carolina, X Corps, Department of the South, to July 1863. Morris Island, South Carolina, X Corps, to April 1864. Morris Island, South Carolina, Northern District, Department of the South, to September 1864.

Company H, 3rd Rhode Island Heavy Artillery mustered out of service October 4, 1864 at Providence, Rhode Island.

=== Detailed service ===
Duty at Hilton Head, S.C., until February 1862. Operations against Fort Pulaski, Ga., February 21-April 10. Bombardment and capture of Fort Pulaski April 9–10. Escort captured garrison to Hilton Head, and duty there until May. Moved to Edisto Island May 23. Operations on James Island, S.C., June 1–28. Action James Island June 10. Battle of Secessionville June 16. Moved to Hilton Head, S.C., June 28-July 1, and duty there until July 1863. Moved to Folly Island, S.C. Attack on Morris Island July 10. Assaults on Fort Wagner, Morris Island, July 11 and 18. Siege of Forts Wagner and Gregg, Morris Island, July 18-September 7. Capture of Forts Wagner and Gregg September 7. Operations against Fort Sumter and Charleston from Morris and Folly Islands until September 1864. Actions on James Island July 1–2, and at Fort Johnson July 3. Moved to Hilton Head, then to New York and Providence September 26–30.

=== Commanders ===
- Captain Augustus Colwell

== Company I ==
Company I, 3rd Rhode Island Heavy Artillery
- Active: December 19, 1861 - October 4, 1864
- Country: United States
- Allegiance: Union
- Branch: Heavy artillery
- Engagements: First Battle of Fort Wagner; Second Battle of Fort Wagner; Second Battle of Charleston Harbor

=== Service ===
The company was attached to Sherman's Expeditionary Corps to April 1862. 3rd Brigade, 1st Division, Department of the South, to July 1862. District of Hilton Head, South Carolina, Department of the South, to September 1862. District of Hilton Head, South Carolina, X Corps, Department of the South, to April 1864. U.S. Forces, Folly Island, South Carolina, X Corps, to July 1863. Morris Island, South Carolina, X Corps, to April 1864. Morris Island, South Carolina, Northern District, Department of the South, to September 1864.

Company I, 3rd Rhode Island Heavy Artillery mustered out of service October 4, 1864 at Providence, Rhode Island.

=== Detailed service ===
Duty at Hilton Head until December 1861. Garrison Fort Drayton, Otter Island, S.C., until May 1862. Duty at Hilton Head until April 1863. Moved to Folly Island, S.C., and duty there until July 1863. Attack on Morris Island, S.C., July 10. Assaults on Fort Wagner, Morris Island, July 11 and 18. Siege of Fort Wagner July 18-September 7. Capture of Forts Wagner and Gregg, Morris Island, September 7. Siege operations against Fort Sumter and Charleston, S.C., from Morris and Folly Islands until September 1864. Actions on James Island July 1–2, and at Fort Johnson July 3. Moved to Hilton Head, S.C., then to New York and Providence September 26–30.

=== Commanders ===
- Captain Charles G. Strahan

== Company K ==
Company K, 3rd Rhode Island Heavy Artillery
- Active: December 19, 1861 - October 4, 1864
- Country: United States
- Allegiance: Union
- Branch: Heavy artillery
- Engagements: Battle of Secessionville

=== Service ===
The battery was attached to Sherman's Expeditionary Corps to April 1862. 3rd Brigade, 1st Division, Department of the South, to July 1862. District of Hilton Head, South Carolina, Department of the South, to September 1862. District of Hilton Head, South Carolina, X Corps, Department of the South, to December 1863. Fort Pulaski, Georgia, District of Hilton Head, South Carolina, Department of the South, to September 1864.

Company K, 3rd Rhode Island Heavy Artillery mustered out of service October 4, 1864 at Providence, Rhode Island.

=== Detailed service ===
Duty at Hilton Head, S.C., until May 1862. Moved to Edisto Island, S.C., May 23. Operations on James Island, S.C., June 1–30. Action on James Island June 10. Battle of Secessionville June 16. Moved to Hilton Head, S.C., June 28-July 1, and duty there until December 1863. Expedition to Pocotaligo, S.C., October 21–23, 1862. Actions at Caston's and Frampton's Plantations and Coosawhatchie October 22. Moved to Fort Pulaski, Ga., December 5, 1863 and duty there until September 1864. Moved to Hilton Head, then to New York and Providence September 26–30.

== Company L ==
Company L, 3rd Rhode Island Heavy Artillery
- Active: March 17, 1862 - October 4, 1864
- Country: United States
- Allegiance: Union
- Branch: Heavy artillery

=== Service ===
Company L, 3rd Rhode Island Heavy Artillery was initially organized in Providence, Rhode Island March 17, 1862 and joined the regiment at Hilton Head, South Carolina.

The company was attached to 3rd Brigade, 1st Division, Department of the South, to July 1862. District of Hilton Head, South Carolina, Department of the South, to September 1862. District of Hilton Head, South Carolina, X Corps, Department of the South, to December 1863. Fort Pulaski, Georgia, District of Hilton Head, South Carolina, Department of the South, to September 1864. Morris Island, South Carolina, 1st Separate Brigade, Department of the South, to March 1865.

In March 1865, members of Company L, 3rd Rhode Island Heavy Artillery were transferred to other companies and the battery ceased to exist.

=== Detailed service ===
Duty at Hilton Head, S.C., until December 1863. Expedition to Pocotaligo, S.C., October 21–23, 1862. Actions at Gaston's and Frampton's Plantations and at Coosawhatchie October 22. Moved to Fort Pulaski, Ga., December 5, 1863 and duty there until September 1864. Moved to Morris Island, S.C., and participated in siege operations against Fort Sumter and Charleston until March 1865.

== Company M ==
Company M, 3rd Rhode Island Heavy Artillery
- Active: March 1862 - March 10, 1865
- Country: United States
- Allegiance: Union
- Branch: Heavy artillery
- Engagements: First Battle of Fort Wagner; Second Battle of Fort Wagner

=== Service ===
Company M, 3rd Rhode Island Heavy Artillery was initially organized in Providence, Rhode Island in March 1862 and joined the regiment at Hilton Head, South Carolina.

The company was attached to 3rd Brigade, 1st Division, Department of the South, to July 1862. District of Hilton Head, South Carolina, Department of the South, to September 1862. District of Hilton Head, South Carolina, X Corps, Department of the South, to July 1863. Folly Island, South Carolina, X Corps, July 1863. Morris Island, South Carolina, X Corps, to April 1864. Morris Island, South Carolina, Northern District, Department of the South, to March 1865.

The company ceased to exist on March 10, 1865 when it was consolidated with other companies in the regiment.

=== Detailed service ===
Duty at Hilton Head, S.C., until July 1863. Expedition to Pocotaligo, S.C., October 21–23, 1862. Actions at Caston's and Frampton's Plantations and Coosawhatchie October 22. Moved to Folly Island, S.C., July 1863. Attack on Morris Island July 10. Assaults on Fort Wagner, Morris Island, S.C., July 11 and 18. Siege of Fort Wagner July 18-September 7. Capture of Forts Wagner and Gregg September 7. Siege operations against Fort Sumter and Charleston until March 1865. Actions on James Island, S.C., July 1–2, 1864, and at Fort Johnson July 3, 1864.

== Regimental commanders ==
The following officers commanded the 3rd Rhode Island Heavy Artillery:

- Colonel Nathaniel W. Brown
- Colonel Edwin Metcalf
- Colonel Charles R. Brayton
- Lieutenant Colonel William Ames

== Casualties ==
Individual company losses are not available, but the regiment's losses (all 12 companies) are reported as a total of 135 men during service; 2 officers and 39 enlisted men killed or mortally wounded, 4 officers and 90 enlisted men died of disease.

== See also ==
- List of Rhode Island Civil War units
- Rhode Island in the American Civil War

== Sources ==
- Cox, Christopher (2013). History of Rhode Island Civil War Regiments: Artillery, Cavalry, and Infantry. Raleigh, North Carolina: Lulu Publishing. ISBN 978-1-304-47006-5.
- Dyer, Frederick H. (1959) [1908]. A Compendium of the War of the Rebellion. New York and London: Thomas Yoseloff. OCLC 765087. Archived from the original on 2012-03-04. (Browsable version at Emory.Edu open to Dyer page 1627 (e-page 1633), the beginning of Rhode Island units' histories)
- Grandchamp, Robert (2012). Rhode Island and the Civil War: Voices from the Ocean State. Charleston, South Carolina: The History Press. ISBN 9781609497613.
- Rhode Island (1865). Report of the Adjutant General of Rhode Island, 1865. Providence: State of Rhode Island. OCLC 181358057.
