= USS Vixen =

USS Vixen may refer to the following ships of the United States Navy:

- USS Vixen (1803), was a schooner, launched in 1803 and captured by the British in 1812
- USS Vixen (1813), was a brig, purchased in 1813 and captured later that same year
- USS Vixen (1846), was a steamship, purchased in 1846 and sold in 1855
- USS Vixen (1861), was a gunboat, acquired in 1861 and decommissioned in 1862
- A monitor previously named USS Neosho (1863) and later named USS Osceola was briefly named USS Vixen while in ordinary in 1869
- USS Vixen (PY-4), was a yacht, built in 1896 and decommissioned in 1922
- USS Vixen (SP-68) was the name given briefly to a tender commissioned in August 1917 but renamed USS Despatch (SP-68)
- USS Vixen (PG-53), was a gunboat, commissioned in 1941 and decommissioned in 1946
