= USS Uncas (1843) =

Gunboat of the United States Navy

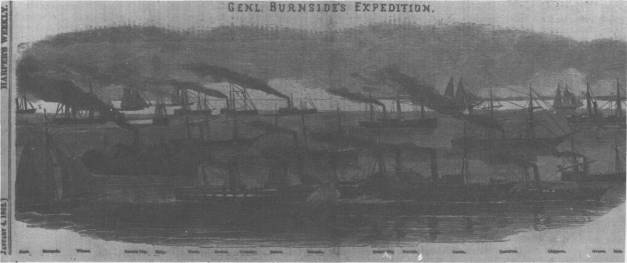
- USS Uncas, with steam sloop USS Tuscarora and gunboat USS Winona, escort U.S. Army transports on their way to capture Roanoke Island and cut Albemarle Sound off from the sea early in 1862 during the American Civil War.

History

United States
- Name: USS Uncas
- Namesake: Uncas (c. 1588 - c. 1683), a sachem of the Mohegan tribe
- Laid down: date unknown
- Launched: 1843
- Acquired: 20 September 1861
- In service: March 1862; at New York City
- Out of service: 4 July 1863; at the New York Navy Yard
- Stricken: 1863
- Fate: Sold 21 August 1863

General characteristics
- Displacement: 192 tons
- Length: 118 ft 6 in (36.12 m)
- Beam: 23 ft 4 in (7.11 m)
- Draught: 7 ft 6 in (2.29 m)
- Propulsion: Steam engine, screw-propelled
- Speed: 11.5 knots
- Armament: one 20-pounder Parrott rifle; two 32-pounder guns

The first USS Uncas was a 192-ton steamer acquired by the Union Navy during the American Civil War.

Uncas was used as a gunboat by the Navy to patrol navigable waterways of the Confederacy to prevent the South from trading with other countries.

== Built in New York City in 1843 ==
Uncas—a screw steamer built at New York City in 1843—was purchased by the Navy there on 20 September 1861 from Dudley Buck for use with the United States Coast Survey. She was refitted at the New York Navy Yard from September 1861 to February 1862 and placed in service early in March.

== Civil War operations ==
=== Uncas sent to Hampton Roads to strengthen Union forces there ===
However, before Uncas could begin her duties for the Coast Survey, the Confederate ironclad ram CSS Virginia attacked the Union warships blockading Hampton Roads, Virginia, sinking frigates Cumberland and Congress and endangering their consorts. As a result of the havoc created by the resurrected Merrimack, Uncas was sent to Hampton Roads to strengthen the Union naval forces still afloat there.

=== Assigned to the North Atlantic Blockade ===
She had arrived in that strategic roadstead by 14 March and, three days later, was officially transferred to the Navy and assigned to the North Atlantic Blockading Squadron. Unfortunately, by that time, Uncas' brief service had revealed serious deficiencies in the ship; and she was ordered to Baltimore, Maryland, for repairs.

=== Transferred to the Gulf of Mexico ===
While she was being readied for action, the Navy again changed its plans for the vessel and sent her to the western part of the Gulf of Mexico where Flag Officer David Farragut was preparing for his daring attack on New Orleans, Louisiana.

On 10 April, the steamer entered the Mississippi River where she was needed to help locate positions for Commander David D. Porter's mortar boats during his impending bombardment of Fort St. Philip and Fort Jackson. Farragut planned to use her as a gunboat in the Mississippi Sound. However, her machinery broke down again almost immediately, and the ship returned north for further repairs before beginning either task.

=== Reassigned to the South Atlantic Blockading Squadron ===
The deficiencies were quickly corrected; and, on the 26th, the ship was steaming to Port Royal, South Carolina, to join Flag Officer Samuel F. Du Pont's South Atlantic Blockading Squadron—when she captured the schooner Belle 30 miles northwest of Charleston, South Carolina. The Belle was operating out of Nassau, New Providence, and purportedly bound for Philadelphia, Pennsylvania, with a cargo of salt, pepper, and soap.

Uncas remained only briefly at Port Royal, being assigned on 29 April 1862 to the blockade of St. Simon's Sound, U.S. state of Georgia, and all inland waters extending from St. Catherine's to St. Andrew's Sounds.

=== Florida operations ===
Uncas next received orders to Florida, arriving in the St. Johns River on 11 June 1862. Uncas first saw action on 1 September 1862 when she and Patroon engaged a company of Confederates at St. John's and Yellow Bluffs. Scattered incidents following this initial clash led to a major encounter with Southern batteries at St. John's Bluff on 11 September 1862. The engagement lasted four hours and 20 minutes. During the action, Uncas fired 143 shells and 13 solid shot while Patroon expended 60 shells. Uncas suffered considerable damage to her upperworks but weathered the fire and forced the defending Confederates to abandon, temporarily, the fort.

The ship and officers drew praise from Flag Officer Du Pont for their conduct. Uncas and Patroon fought a second, minor battle at the bluffs on 2 October 1862. Uncas continued patrol and reconnaissance work on the river through the winter and into the spring of 1863.

On 10 March 1863, in company with Norwich, Uncas escorted Army transports up the St. John's River with troops who landed and occupied Jacksonville, Florida.

== Decommissioning due to poor condition of the vessel ==
On 10 June 1863, Flag Officer Du Pont ordered Uncas to Port Royal for repairs. The vessel's deteriorated condition upon arrival prompted further orders on 4 July 1863 directing Uncas to proceed to the New York Navy Yard.

Uncas was stricken and sold at public auction at the New York Navy Yard on 21 August 1863. She was redocumented as Claymont on 20 November 1863 and remained in merchant service until abandoned in 1886.
