= Benjamin C. Christ =

American Union army officer (1824-1869)

- Born: September 12, 1824; Minersville, Pennsylvania
- Died: March 27, 1869 (aged 44); Philadelphia, Pennsylvania
- Burial place: First United Methodist Church Cemetery, Minersville, Pennsylvania
- Military career
- Allegiance: United States of America
- Branch: United States Army; Union Army
- Service years: 1861-1864
- Rank: Colonel; Brevet Brigadier General
- Commands: 50th Pennsylvania Infantry Regiment
- Conflicts: American Civil War: Battle of Chantilly; Battle of Antietam; Battle of Fredericksburg; Siege of Vicksburg; Siege of Knoxville; Battle of the Wilderness; Battle of Spotsylvania Court House; Siege of Petersburg

Benjamin Caspar Christ (September 12, 1824 – March 27, 1869) was an officer in the Union army during the American Civil War. He commanded a brigade in the IX Corps of the Army of the Potomac at several important battles, including the Battle of Antietam.

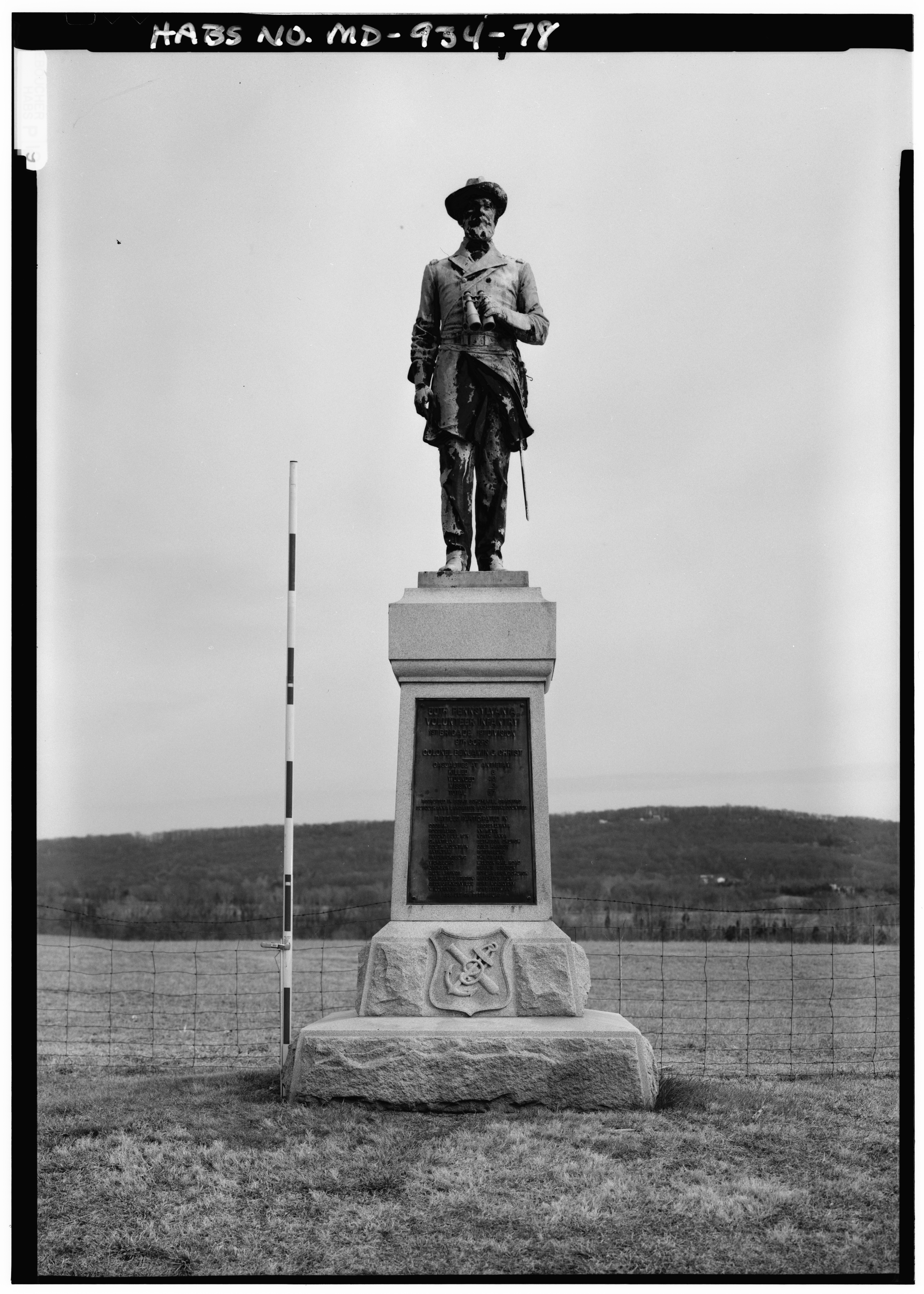
50th Pennsylvania Infantry Monument, Antietam Battlefield, Sharpsburg, Maryland.

Christ grew up in Minersville, Pennsylvania, where, as an adult, he was a coal merchant and a hotel proprietor.

With the outbreak of the Civil War, Christ received an appointment on April 21, 1861, as the lieutenant colonel of the 5th Pennsylvania Infantry. He mustered out July 25 at the end of the regiment's 3-months service. In September, he was appointed as colonel of the 50th Pennsylvania Infantry, and participated in the Battle of Port Royal. Soon he was in command of the 1st Brigade, 1st Division of the IX Corps. At Chantilly, he assumed temporary command of his division upon the death of, Isaac Stevens. He returned to command of the 1st Brigade and fought at the battles of South Mountain and at Antietam near Burnside's Bridge. Shortly after Antietam he was transferred to command of the 2nd Brigade in the 1st Division. This brigade he led at the Battle of Fredericksburg. Christ was in command of the 3rd Brigade, 2nd Division in the IX Corps during the Siege of Vicksburg but returned to command of the 2nd Brigade during the Knoxville Campaign. In the Spring of 1864 the IX Corps was transferred back to the Eastern Theater and Christ took command of the 2nd Brigade in the 3rd Division and fought at the battles of the Wilderness, Spotsylvania, Cold Harbor. When the Union army assaulted the Confederate works at Petersburg, Christ was wounded. He left the field for only a short time before returning to command the 1st Brigade, 3rd Division in the IX Corps. He was mustered out on September 30, 1864.

At the close of the war, he received a brevet promotion to brigadier general for his services at the battles of Spotsylvania and Petersburg.

He died shortly after the war's end in 1869 in Philadelphia. Veterans from his 50th Pennsylvania erected a monument on the Antietam Battlefield in 1904. It features a bronze statue of Colonel Christ.

== See also ==
- List of American Civil War brevet generals (Union)
