= William Stephen Walker =

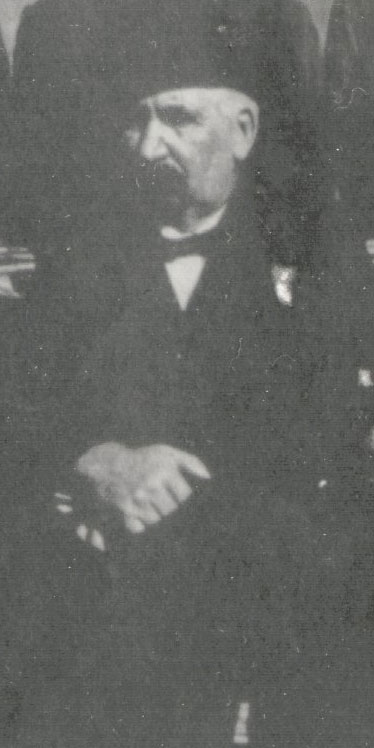
- Image of Walker from an 1899 group photo
- Born: April 13, 1822; Pittsburgh, Pennsylvania, U.S.
- Died: June 7, 1899 (aged 77); Atlanta, Georgia, U.S.
- Burial place: Atlanta, Georgia, U.S.
- Military career
- Allegiance: United States of America; Confederate States of America
- Branch: United States Army; Confederate States Army
- Service years: 1847–1848 and 1855–1861 (USA); 1861–1865 (CSA)
- Rank: Captain (USA); Brigadier General (CSA)
- Nickname: "Live Oak"
- Conflicts: Mexican–American War; American Civil War

William Stephen Walker (April 13, 1822 – June 7, 1899) was a Confederate States Army brigadier general during the American Civil War (Civil War). He was born in Pittsburgh, Pennsylvania, but was raised by Robert J. Walker, his uncle, who was a Secretary of the Treasury and U.S. Senator. Walker served as a first lieutenant in the United States Army during the Mexican–American War from 1847 to 1848. He was discharged in 1848. Walker rejoined the army as captain in the 1st U.S. Cavalry Regiment on March 3, 1855, and served until he resigned on May 1, 1861. Walker was wounded in the left arm and lost his left foot during the Battle of Ware Bottom Church during the Overland Campaign. After the war, he lived at Atlanta, Georgia.

== Early life ==
William Stephen Walker was born April 13, 1822, at Pittsburgh, Pennsylvania, but was raised in Mississippi and Washington, D.C., by his uncle, Secretary of the Treasury (under President James K. Polk) and Senator Robert J. Walker, who also was originally from Pennsylvania. He attended a private school in Georgetown, D.C.

Walker volunteered for U.S. Army service in the Mexican–American War and was appointed first lieutenant in the infantry on February 27, 1847. On April 9, 1847, he was assigned to the 1st U.S. Regiment of Voltigeurs and Foot Riflemen, a light infantry regiment. He was regimental adjutant between May 1, 1847, and June 15, 1847. Walker was appointed a brevet captain for his role in the Battle of Chapultepec, September 13, 1847. With the disbanding of the Voltiguer regiment at the end of the war, Walker was discharged on August 31, 1848.

Walker returned to the U.S. Army as a captain of the 1st U.S. Cavalry Regiment on March 3, 1855, when the army was expanded during that year.

== American Civil War service ==
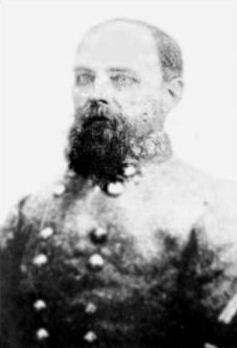
William S. Walker in Brigadier General uniform

William S. Walker resigned from the U.S. Army on May 1, 1861. He had already been appointed a captain in the infantry of the Army of the Confederate States (the regular army of the Confederate States) on March 16, 1861 or, according to other versions, was appointed to this position soon after his resignation from the U.S. Army. He was appointed as from Florida. Early in the war, he served as a mustering officer. Walker served as an aide-de-camp to General Robert E. Lee from November 5, 1861, to December 1861.

Walker served as assistant inspector general, Department of South Carolina, Georgia and East Florida, December 1861 to March 14, 1862. He was promoted to colonel and assistant inspector general on March 22, 1862. On May 29, 1862, Walker was in immediate command of a force which drove off a Union Army force at the First Battle of Pocotaligo, South Carolina as they tried to expand their bridgehead from Port Royal, South Carolina, gained at the Battle of Port Royal, on November 7, 1861. Walker was promoted to brigadier general on October 22, 1862. He was alternately twice in charge of the Third Subdistrict and Fourth Subdistrict of the District of South Carolina. He was in command at Kinston, North Carolina, where he had just gone on April 29, 1864, when he was called to help General P.G.T. Beauregard defend Petersburg, Virginia, during the Overland Campaign on May 17, 1864. With the sudden injury of Brigadier General Nathan George Evans, Walker would take command of the "Tramp Brigade" which consisted of the 17th, 18th, 22nd, 23rd, and 26th South Carolina Infantry Regiments, the Holcombe Legion Infantry Regiment and the MacBeth South Carolina Artillery.

On May 20, 1864, William Stephen Walker was severely wounded and captured at the Battle of Ware Bottom Church during the Bermuda Hundred Campaign. He was wounded in the left arm and lost his left leg after he led a charge into the Union line and was subjected to a rifle volley after refusing to surrender and then captured. Walker thought he was mortally wounded but was saved by Union surgeon John J. Craven at Fort Monroe, who amputated his leg. He was exchanged on October 29, 1864. Walker served at Weldon, North Carolina, from October 29, 1864, to May 1, 1865, and was in command in North Carolina at the end of the war. He was paroled at Greensboro, North Carolina, on May 1, 1865.

== Aftermath ==
After the Civil War, Walker moved to Georgia. William Stephen Walker died at Atlanta, Georgia on June 7, 1899. He is buried in Oakland Cemetery at Atlanta.

== See also ==
- List of American Civil War generals (Confederate)
