= 48th New York Infantry Regiment =

- Active: September 10, 1861, to August 16, 1865
- Country: United States
- Allegiance: Union
- Branch: Infantry
- Nickname: Continental Guard
- Engagements: Siege of Fort Pulaski; Battle of Secessionville; Second Battle of Fort Wagner; Second Battle of Charleston Harbor; Battle of Olustee; Battle of Cold Harbor; Bermuda Hundred Campaign; Battle of Port Walthall Junction; Battle of Cold Harbor; Siege of Petersburg; Battle of the Crater; Second Battle of Deep Bottom; Battle of Chaffin's Farm; First Battle of Fort Fisher; Second Battle of Fort Fisher; Carolinas campaign; Battle of Wilmington

The 48th New York Infantry Regiment was an infantry regiment in the Union Army during the American Civil War.

== Service ==
The 48th New York Infantry was organized at Brooklyn, New York and mustered in for three years service on September 10, 1861, under the command of Colonel James H. Perry.

The regiment was attached to Viele's 1st Brigade, Sherman's South Carolina Expeditionary Corps, to April 1862. Fort Pulaski, Georgia, X Corps, Department of the South, to May 1863. St. Helena Island, South Carolina, X Corps, to June 1863. 2nd Brigade, Folly Island, South Carolina, to July 1863. 2nd Brigade, 2nd Division, Morris Island, South Carolina, to August 1863. St. Augustine, Florida, to October 1863. District of Hilton Head, South Carolina, to January 1864. Barton's Brigade, District of Hilton Head, South Carolina, to February 1864. Barton's Brigade, District of Florida, February 1864. Barton's Brigade, Ames' Division, District of Florida, to April 1864. 2nd Brigade, 2nd Division, X Corps, Army of the James, Department of Virginia and North Carolina, to May 1864. 1st Brigade, 3rd Division, XVIII Corps, to June 1864. 2nd Brigade, 2nd Division, X Corps, to December 1864. 2nd Brigade, 2nd Division, XXIV Corps, to January 1865. 2nd Brigade, 2nd Division, Terry's Provisional Corps, Department of North Carolina, to March 1865. 2nd Brigade, 2nd Division, X Corps, Department of North Carolina, to July 1865. Department of North Carolina to August 1865.

The 48th New York Infantry mustered out of service on August 16, 1865.

== Detailed service ==
The 48th, the "Continental Guard," and "The Fighting Parson's regiment" due to not just the Col. being a Methodist Minister but the high number of Methodists among the offices contained seven Brooklyn companies, one from New York, one from Monmouth County, New Jersey, and one from Brooklyn and Monmouth county. It was mustered into the U. S. service at Brooklyn Aug. 16 to Sept. 14, 1861, for three years; left the state for Washington Sept. 16; was attached to the 1st brigade of Gen. Sherman's force; embarked for Port Royal late in October, and was active in the capture of the fortifications of Port Royal ferry Jan. 1, 1862. In the siege operations against Fort Pulaski, Ga., the 48th took a prominent part and after the fall of the fortress was assigned to garrison duty there with expeditions in September and October to Bluffton, Cranston's Bluff and Mackay's Point. In June, 1863, the regiment with the exception of Cos. G and I, left Fort Pulaski and proceeded to Hilton Head, where it was there attached to Strong's Brigade, 10th Corps, with which it participated in the movement against Fort Wagner in July. In the assault of July 18, the loss of the 48th was 242 killed, wounded and missing, including Col. Barton wounded and Lieut.-Col. Green killed. The regiment received high praise from the commanding officers for its gallantry in this action. In August it formed a part of the Florida expedition; was posted for some time at St. Augustine; participated in the disastrous battle at Olustee, with a loss of 44 in killed, wounded and missing; then retired to Jacksonville; proceeded up the river to Palatka on March 10, 1864, remained there until April when it was transferred to the Army of the James at Bermuda Hundred, and was assigned to the 2nd Brigade, 2nd Division, 10th Corps. In the engagement at Port Walthall Junction the regiment again showed its mettle by heroic conduct in spite of severe loss. On May 30 it was assigned to the 1st Brigade, 3rd Division, 18th Corps, and on June 15, to the 2nd Brigade, 2nd Division, 10th Corps. It took a prominent part in the battle of Cold Harbor; was in the first assault on Petersburg and in action at the explosion of the mine; and was engaged at Strawberry Plains and Fort Harrison. The original members not reenlisted were mustered out at New York City on Sept. 24, 1864, but 350 members having reenlisted in Dec., 1863, the regiment retained its organization. In Dec., 1864, with the 2nd Brigade, 2nd Division, 24th Corps, the 48th was ordered to Fort Fisher, N. C., was active in the capture of the fortifications there in Jan., 1865, and served for some months in that vicinity. In March it was attached to the provisional corps, in April to the 10th Corps and during the summer months performed various routine duties in the neighborhood of Raleigh, N. C., where it was finally mustered out on Sept. 1, 1865. During its term of service 2,173 members were enrolled, and of these 236 or over 10 percent, were killed or mortally wounded in action, a loss exceeded among the regiments of the state only by the 69th and 40th. It was 17th in the list of all of the regiments of the Union armies in total loss. In the battles of the regiment 868 men were reported killed, wounded or missing, and it earned by desperate fighting its right to be known as a crack fighting regiment.

== Casualties ==
The regiment lost a total of 369 men during service; 18 officers and 218 enlisted men killed or mortally wounded, 2 officers and 131 enlisted men died of disease.

== Commanders ==
- Colonel James H. Perry - died in the service at the Second Battle of Fort Wagner, June 18, 1862
- Colonel William B. Barton
- Colonel William B. Coan

== Notable members ==
- Corporal Joseph C. Hibson, Company C - Medal of Honor recipient for action near Fort Wagner on three occasions

== See also ==
- List of New York Civil War regiments
- New York in the Civil War
