= USS Patroon =

Gunboat of the United States Navy

History

United States
- Name: USS Patroon
- Namesake: Previous name retained
- Completed: 1859
- Acquired: 28 October 1861
- Commissioned: 18 March 1862
- Decommissioned: 18 November 1862
- Fate: Sold 30 December 1862; Sank 10 November 1865

General characteristics
- Displacement: 183 tons
- Length: 113 ft (34 m)
- Beam: 22 ft 5 in (6.83 m)
- Draught: 7 ft 8 in (2.34 m)
- Propulsion: steam engine; screw-propelled
- Speed: not known
- Complement: 49
- Armament: one 30-pounder Parrott rifle; four 8" guns

USS Patroon was a screw steamer acquired by the United States Navy during the American Civil War. The Union Navy used her to patrol off the coast of the Confederate States of America to enforce the Union blockade.

== Construction, acquisition, and commissioning ==
Patroon, a wooden screw steamer built at Philadelphia, Pennsylvania, in 1859, was purchased from R. T. Loper by the U.S. Navy 28 October 1861 at Trenton, New Jersey. She was commissioned as USS Patroon at the New York Navy Yard in Brooklyn, New York, on 18 March 1862 with acting Master Edward McKeige in command.

== Service history ==
Assigned to the South Atlantic Blockading Squadron, Patroon was stationed off the coast of Florida off the St. Johns River early in May 1862. She spent most of her naval career operating along the coast of Florida, enforcing the blockade, silencing Confederate coastal artillery, and gathering intelligence about Confederate defenses.

The highlight of her U.S. Navy service came on 11 September 1862, when, with the gunboat USS Uncas, she dueled with Confederate artillery batteries at St. John's Bluff, Florida. Although Uncas was damaged, the two ships forced the Confederates to abandon their positions and retire inland out of range.

Throughout her U.S. Navy career, leaks and a variety of other problems limited Patroon's effectiveness, and she was soon ordered north. Decommissioned on 18 November 1862, she was sold at public auction at Philadelphia 30 December 1862.

== Later career ==
The United States Department of War purchased Patroon on 8 December 1863 for American Civil War service with the Union Army. After the war, she sank at Brazos, Texas, on 10 November 1865.
