= Middleton Stuart Elliott =

American Navy physician, admiral and Medal of Honor recipient

- Born: October 16, 1872; Beaufort, South Carolina, U.S.
- Died: October 29, 1952 (aged 80); Sawtelle, Los Angeles, California, U.S.
- Burial place: Fort Rosecrans National Cemetery
- Relatives: Stephen Elliott Jr. (uncle)
- Military career
- Allegiance: United States of America
- Branch: United States Navy
- Service years: 1896–1936, 1942
- Rank: Vice Admiral
- Conflicts: Spanish–American War; Philippine–American War; United States occupation of Veracruz; World War I World War II
- Awards: Medal of Honor

Middleton Stuart Elliott Jr. (October 16, 1872 – October 29, 1952) was a United States Navy physician and admiral, and a Medal of Honor recipient for his role in the United States occupation of Veracruz.

== Biography ==
Elliott was born on October 16, 1872, in Beaufort, South Carolina. His father was Middleton Stuart Elliott Sr. (1841–1921), who served in the Beaufort Volunteer Artillery in the Confederate States Army during the American Civil War. His uncle was Brigadier General Stephen Elliott. He was raised in Beaufort and attended medical school at Columbian College, known later as George Washington University. Elliott received his medical degree in 1894.

Elliott was appointed from South Carolina to the United States Navy in October 1896 as a Passed Assistant Surgeon, with the rank of ensign. After briefly serving at the Naval Laboratory in New York, he reported to USS Porter then transferred to USS Texas, where he participated in the Spanish–American War. In October 1899, Elliott was promoted to lieutenant (junior grade) and ordered to Port Royal Naval Station, South Carolina. Following this duty, he served on USS Annapolis (PG-10), USS Kentucky (BB-6) and USS New York (ACR-2) and participated in the Philippine–American War. While at sea, he was promoted to lieutenant. In March 1903, Elliott was promoted to Surgeon with the corresponding rank of lieutenant commander. In November, he reported to Naval Hospital Norfolk, Virginia. Two years later, he served in succession on board the monitor USS Florida (BM-9), USS St. Louis (C-20) and USS Maine (BB-10). In November 1908, he was assigned to the Naval Hospital in Washington D.C.

In mid-1911, Elliott was ordered to USS Utah (BB-31), transferring to USS Florida (BB-30). While on Florida, he participated as a Surgeon in the intervention at Vera Cruz, Mexico. On April 21, 1914, he quickly established a base hospital and supervised the removal of the wounded and field station operations until the city's capture the next day. For his "distinguished conduct in battle" on this occasion, he was awarded the Medal of Honor. That summer, he reported for shore duty at the Navy Recruiting Station in New York City. While on recruiting duty in August 1916, he was promoted to Medical Inspector with the corresponding rank of commander. During World War I, he commanded the Naval Hospital and Supply Depot at Cañacao Bay, Philippines. In January 1918, Elliott was promoted Medical Director with the corresponding rank of captain. Returning to Washington D.C. in December 1919, he assumed command of the Naval Hospital.

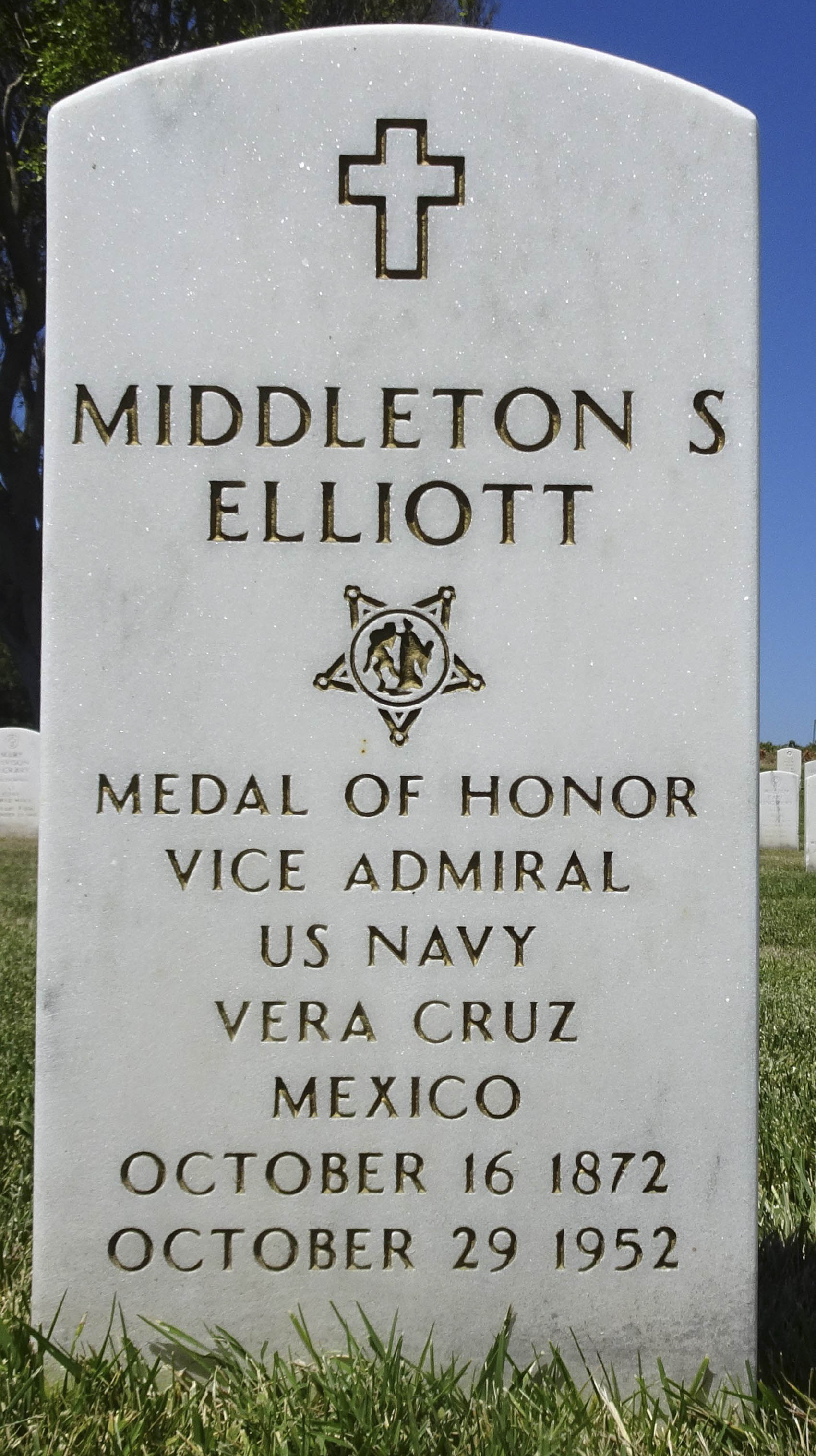
Gravestone of Vice Admiral Elliott at Fort Rosecrans National Cemetery

In April 1923, Elliott served at the Mare Island Navy Yard, Vallejo, California, followed by a tour at the Puget Sound Navy Yard, Bremerton, Washington. In June 1927, he was promoted to rear admiral, which made him the first medical officer in the United States Navy to reach the rank of admiral. In June 1929, he became the District Medical Officer for the Eleventh Naval District based in San Diego, California. Returning to Washington, D.C. three years later, he served on the Naval Retirement Board observing Medical and Naval Exams. Remaining in the area during the last quarter of 1933, he became an inspector at the Medical Department Activities section within the Bureau of Medicine and Surgery. In January 1935, Elliott became the president of the Naval Retirement Board. In December, he was appointed as the Inspector of Medical Department Activities for the Eleventh, Twelve, Thirteenth, and Fourteenth Naval Districts. In November 1936, he retired and was placed on the retired list. During World War II, he was briefly recalled to active duty in February 1942, was promoted to vice admiral, and then was placed back on the retired list with his promoted rank. Elliott suffered a cerebral hemorrhage on October 20, 1952 and died on October 29, 1952 in the hospital at the Sawtelle Veterans facility in West Los Angeles, California. He is buried at Fort Rosecrans National Cemetery, San Diego, California.

Elliott was a fellow of the American College of Surgeons. In 2004, the elementary school at the Marine Corps Base Beaufort, South Carolina, was named in his honor.

== Medal of Honor citation ==
Elliott's official Medal of Honor citation reads:

For distinguished conduct in battle, engagements of Vera Cruz, 21 and 22 April 1914. Surg. Elliott was eminent and conspicuous in the efficient establishment and operation of the base hospital, and in his cool judgment and courage in supervising first aid stations on the firing line and removing the wounded.

== See also ==
- List of Medal of Honor recipients (Veracruz)
