= 3rd Rhode Island Infantry Regiment =

- Active: August 1861 to December 19, 1861
- Country: United States
- Allegiance: Union
- Branch: Infantry
- Engagements: Battle of Port Royal

The 3rd Rhode Island Infantry Regiment was an infantry regiment in the Union Army during the American Civil War.

== Service ==
The 3rd Rhode Island Infantry Regiment was organized at Providence, Rhode Island, in August 1861.

The regiment left Rhode Island for Fort Hamilton, New York Harbor, September 7, 1861, then moved to Washington, D.C., September 14–16, returning to Fort Hamilton September 22. Moved to Fort Monroe, Virginia, October 12–14. It was attached to Sherman's South Carolina Expeditionary Corps. Participated in the expedition to Port Royal, South Carolina, October 28-November 7. Capture of Fort Walker and Fort Beauregard, Port Royal Harbor, November 7.

The 3rd Rhode Island Infantry ceased to exist on December 19, 1861, when it was changed to 3rd Rhode Island Heavy Artillery.

== See also ==
- List of Rhode Island Civil War units
- Rhode Island in the American Civil War
- Battery A, 3rd Rhode Island Heavy Artillery
