= Coosawhatchie River =

River in South Carolina, U.S.

Coordinates: 32°31′51″N 80°50′54″W

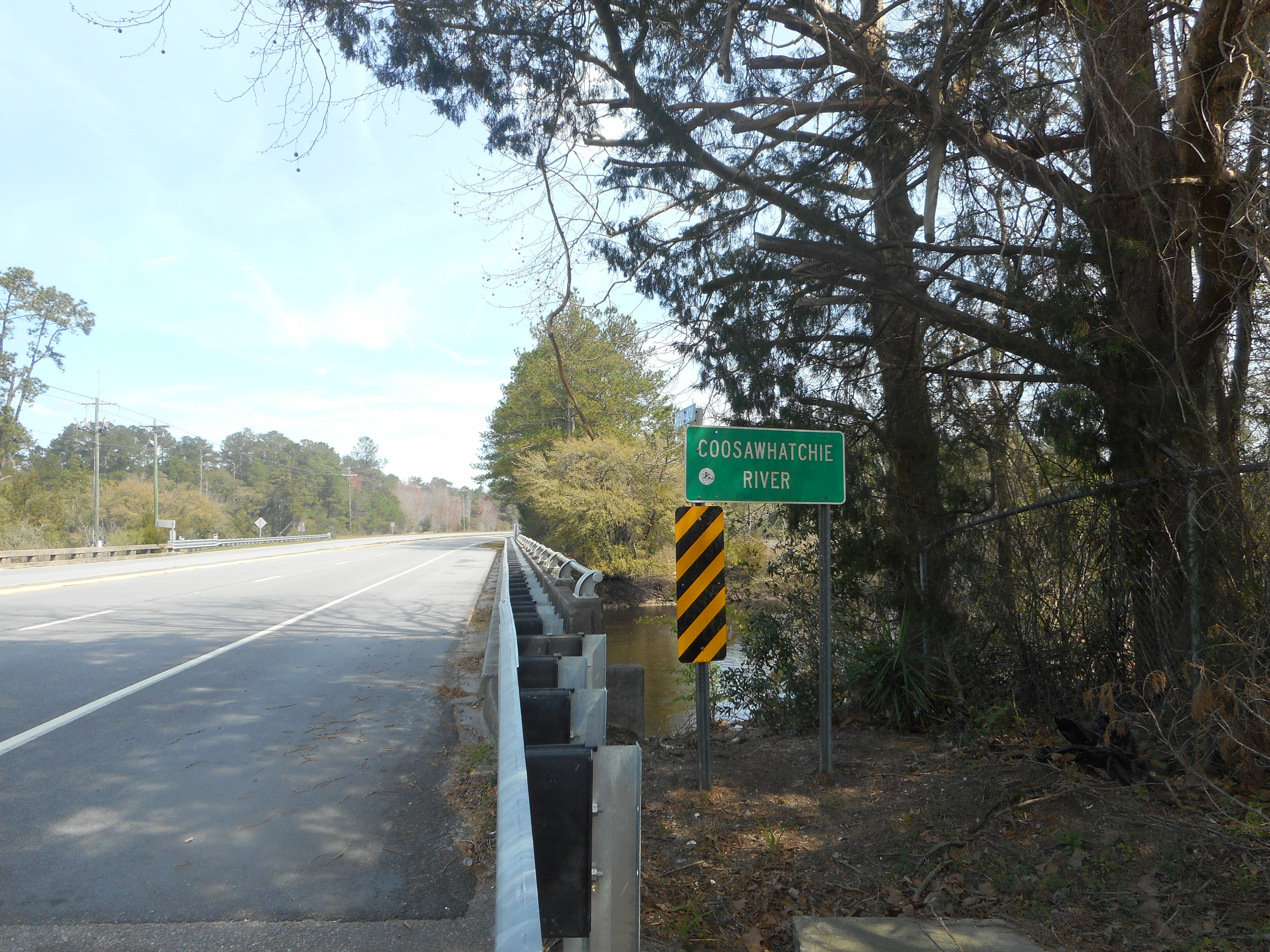
The former US 17 bridge over the river in Coosawhatchie, South Carolina, now a frontage road for Interstate 95.

The Coosawhatchie River (/kuːsəˈhætʃi/ koo-sə-HATCH-ee) is a river in the U.S. state of South Carolina. It rises in Allendale County near the towns of Allendale and Fairfax and accepts drainage from Swallow Savanna, Harters Pond, Little Duck Branch, Duck Branch, Beech Branch (LevyBay), Blood Hill Creek, and Cedar Branch. The channel flows southeast to the Broad River. It is 50 mi/80 km long.
