= John Wainwright (soldier) =

American military officer (1839–1915)

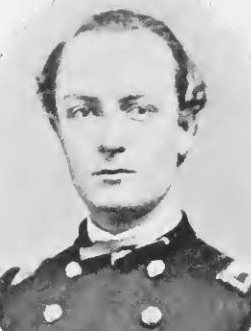
- Col. John Wainwright, c. 1865
- Born: July 13, 1839; Syracuse, New York, US
- Died: April 15, 1915 (aged 75); Wilmington, Delaware, US
- Burial place: Arlington National Cemetery
- Military career
- Allegiance: United States
- Branch: United States Army: Union Army
- Service years: 1861–1865
- Rank: Colonel
- Units: 2nd Pennsylvania Infantry Regiment (three months' service); 97th Pennsylvania Infantry Regiment (three years' service, two terms)
- Commands: 97th Pennsylvania Infantry
- Conflicts: American Civil War: First Battle of Bull Run; Siege of Fort Pulaski; Battle of Secessionville; Second Battle of Charleston Harbor; Second Battle of Fort Wagner; Battle of Cold Harbor; Siege of Petersburg; Battle of the Crater; Second Battle of Deep Bottom; Battle of Chaffin's Farm; Battle of Fair Oaks & Darbytown Road; First Battle of Fort Fisher; Second Battle of Fort Fisher; Carolinas campaign; Battle of Wilmington
- Awards: Medal of Honor

John Wainwright (July 13, 1839 – April 15, 1915) was a United States military officer during the American Civil War. A native of Syracuse, New York, he was awarded his nation's highest award for valor, the Medal of Honor, for his "gallant and meritorious conduct" while serving in the Union Army as a first lieutenant with the 97th Pennsylvania Infantry during the Second Battle of Fort Fisher, North Carolina on January 15, 1865.

== Formative years ==
Born in Syracuse, New York on July 13, 1839, John Wainwright was a son of Rahway, New Jersey native Samuel Force Wainwright and Maria (Humphry) Wainwright. During his early childhood, his parents relocated their family several times, first to Rahway, New Jersey, then to New York City, and then to Delaware, where, as an older child, John Wainwright was encouraged to learn the trade of coach painting. By 1850, he was residing in New York City's 11th Ward with his 35-year-old mother and siblings, Henry, Sam, and Benson (born, respectively, circa 1841, 1844, and 1848).

At the dawn of the American Civil War, he was living in West Chester, Pennsylvania, where he was employed as a coach painter.

== Civil War ==
John Wainwright became one of Pennsylvania's earliest responders to President Abraham Lincoln's call for 75,000 volunteers to help defend the nation's capital following the fall of Fort Sumter to Confederate States Army troops on April 13, 1861. After enrolling for military service in Harrisburg, Pennsylvania on April 20, he officially mustered in there as a private with Company G of the 2nd Pennsylvania Infantry. Military records at the time described him as a resident of West Chester, Pennsylvania. Engaged in operations in Maryland and Virginia during early July, including occupation duties near Falling Waters, Martinsburg, and Bunker Hill, he then fought with his regiment in the First Battle of Bull Run on July 21. After completing his Three Months' Service, he honorably mustered out on July 26, and returned home to Pennsylvania.

Wainwright then promptly re-enlisted. After re-enrolling for Civil War military service at West Chester on September 23, 1861, he then officially mustered in there as second sergeant with Company F of the 97th Pennsylvania Infantry. Military records at the time described him as being a 28-year-old coach painter residing in West Chester, who was 5'7" tall with light hair, grey eyes and a light complexion. Promoted to first sergeant on October 3, 1861, he participated with his regiment in the Union Army's Expedition to Point Royal, South Carolina during the fall and early winter of 1861 and in the Union's 112-day Siege of Fort Pulaski, Georgia, which began in December 1861 and ended with the Battle of Fort Pulaski April 10–11, 1862. During this phase of service, he was commissioned as a second lieutenant on January 10, 1862.

He engaged with his regiment and other Union forces in the capture of Fort Clinch and Fernandina, Florida in March 1862 and in the operations in South Carolina on James and Edisto islands leading up to the Battle of Secessionville. He was then shot in the thigh at James Island, South Carolina on June 12 of that year while advancing with his picket detail along the Charleston Road to the Stono River. Following several weeks of convalescence at the regimental hospital, he returned to duty. In October 1862, he and his fellow 97th Pennsylvanians helped capture Jacksonville, Florida. Commissioned as a first lieutenant on May 1, 1863 at St. Helena Island, South Carolina, he was detailed from May 10 to June 11 as acting adjutant of his regiment, and was temporarily placed in command of the 97th Pennsylvania's H Company from July 4 to September 7, during which time he participated with his regiment and other Union troops in: the capture of Morris Island, South Carolina; the siege of Forts Wagner, Gregg, Sumter, Moultrie, and Johnson; and the Second Battle of Fort Wagner (July 18, 1863). He was then temporarily reassigned as commander of his regiment's F Company from September 7 to November 5.

Participating with his regiment in the Union Army's operations at Camp Cooper, Woodstock Mills and Kings Ferry, Florida during the early part of 1864, and still holding the rank of first lieutenant, he was placed in temporary command of the 97th Pennsylvania's I Company from February 25 to March 27. He was then awarded a veterans' furlough, and used that time to return north where, on April 18, 1864, he wed Coatesville, Pennsylvania resident Emma M. Edwards (1845–1922).

After reconnecting with his regiment on May 14 at Foster's Place, Virginia, he was placed in temporary command of the 97th Pennsylvania's E Company from May 17 to June 13, during which time he and his men fought in the Battle of Cold Harbor (May 31 to June 12). Reassigned as temporary commander of his regiment's F Company from June 13 through late August, he then participated with his regiment and other Union troops in the Siege of Petersburg, including the Battle of the Crater (July 30) and Second Battle of Deep Bottom (August 14–20). On August 25, 1864, still holding the rank of first lieutenant, he was placed in charge of his regiment. Two months later, he received an honorable mention from his superiors for his display of gallantry during the Battle of Chaffin's Farm, Virginia on October 7, 1864 while serving as acting regimental adjutant. He then fought with his regiment in the Battle of Fair Oaks and Darbytown Road (October 27–28).

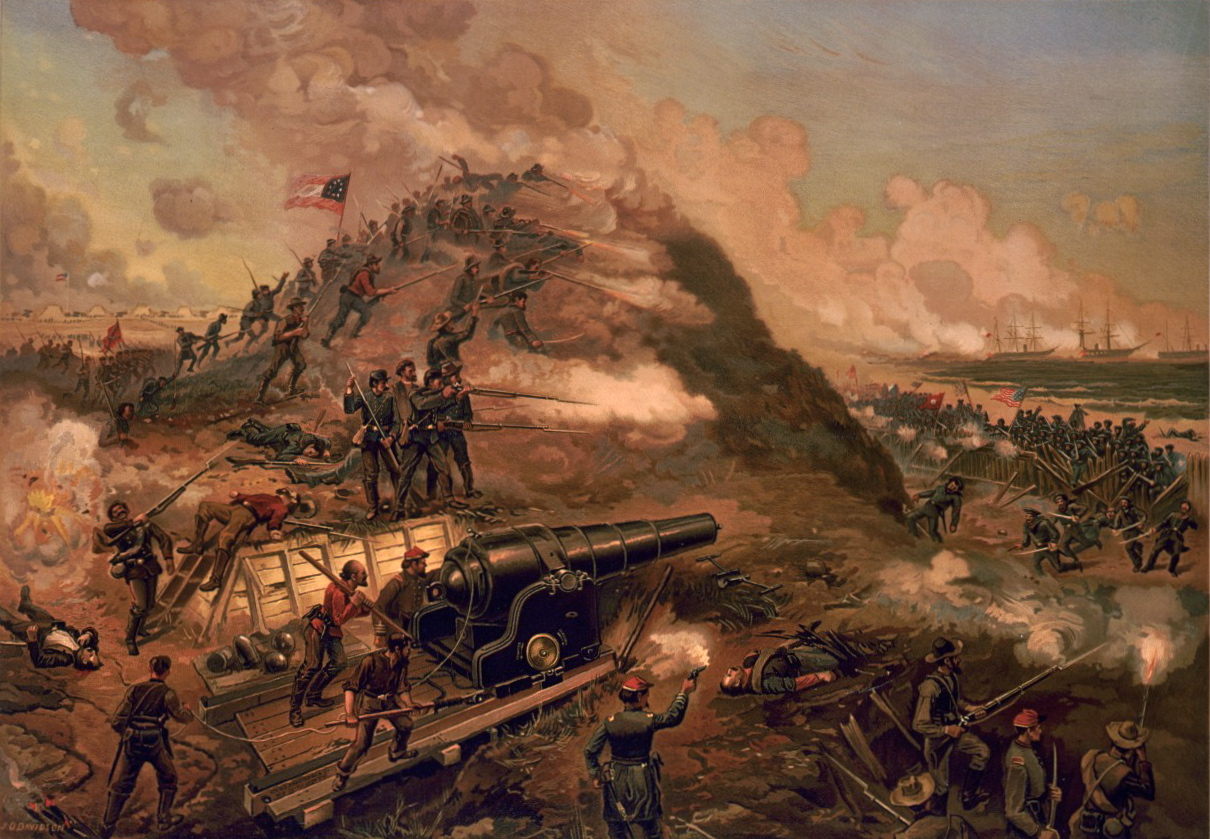
Second Battle of Fort Fisher, January 15, 1865.

Commissioned, but not mustered, as a captain on November 1, 1864, he then fought with his regiment in the First Battle of Fort Fisher (December 23–27), and was subsequently brevetted as a major.

Brevetted again on January 15, 1865, Wainwright was once again placed in command of the 97th Pennsylvania, this time when his regiment's commanding officer, Colonel Galusha Pennypacker, was assigned by his superiors to command a Union brigade during the Second Battle of Fort Fisher. Fighting with the 97th Pennsylvania in that same battle, Wainwright was wounded in the right shoulder by grape shot while performing the acts of gallantry which resulted in his receipt of the U.S. Medal of Honor.

Next engaged with his regiment in the Carolinas campaign from February to March 1865, including the Battle of Wilmington, North Carolina (February 11–22), he was then advanced to the rank of lieutenant colonel of the 97th Pennsylvania Infantry on March 14 (mustering in at that new rank on April 19) and again to colonel of the 97th Pennsylvania Infantry on June 1, 1865 (mustering in at that rank on June 15).

Assigned to command the Union's post at Gaston, North Carolina on the day he became a colonel, he mustered out of the army at Weldon, North Carolina on August 28, 1865.

== Post-war life ==
Following his honorable discharge from the military, Wainwright returned home to his wife. Together, they welcomed the births of their children: Blanche J., who was born circa 1867; Gretta Maude (1872–1941), who was born in December 1872; and John D. Wainwright (1878–1965), a two-time Navy Cross winner who commanded the U.S. Navy's Yangtze Patrol/Asiatic Fleet during the 1930s. Employed as a dry goods merchant during the 1870s and 1880s, the elder John Wainwright resided with his wife and children in Wilmington, Delaware, and became an active member of the Grand Army of the Republic, as well as a companion of the District of Columbia Commandery of the Military Order of the Loyal Legion of the United States. At the turn of the century, Wainwright lived in the 5th Ward of Wilmington with his wife and daughter, Maude (Wainwright) Pyle, who was divorced from her husband. Also residing at the home was Katie Regan, a 20-year-old servant.

== Death and interment ==
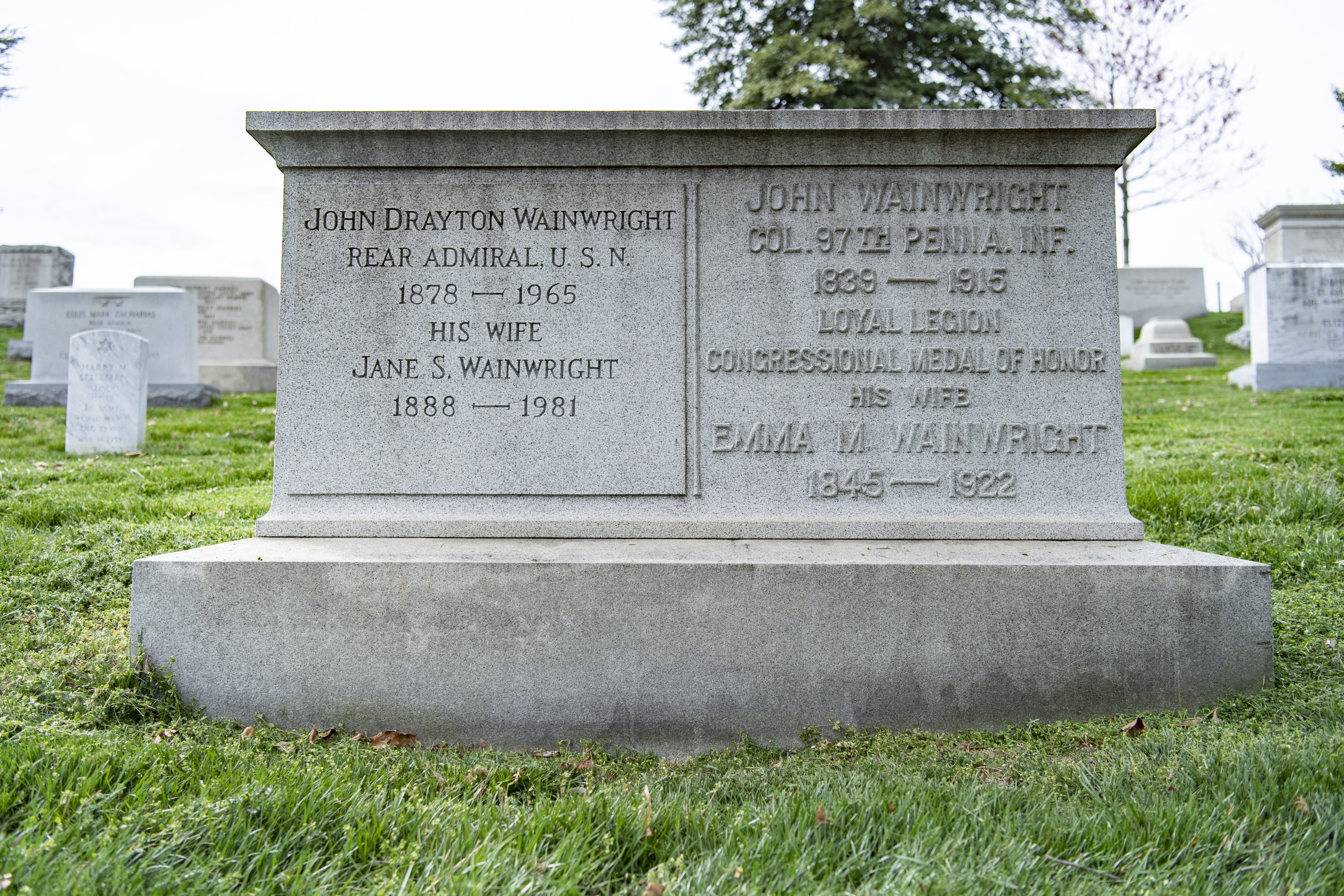
Grave at Arlington National Cemetery

John Wainwright died in Wilmington, Delaware on April 15, 1915. He was buried at Arlington National Cemetery.

== Medal of Honor citation ==
For The President of the United States of America, in the name of Congress, takes pleasure in presenting the Medal of Honor to First Lieutenant John Wainwright, United States Army, for gallant and meritorious conduct on 15 January 1865, while serving with Company F, 97th Pennsylvania Infantry, in action at Fort Fisher, North Carolina, where, as first lieutenant, he commanded the regiment.

General Orders: Date of Issue: June 24, 1890

Action Date: January 15, 1865

Service: Army

Rank: First Lieutenant

Company: Company F

Division: 97th Pennsylvania Infantry

== See also ==
- List of American Civil War Medal of Honor recipients: T–Z
- List of Medal of Honor recipients for the Second Battle of Fort Fisher
- Pennsylvania in the American Civil War
