= Henry Ruhl Guss =

Union Army officer

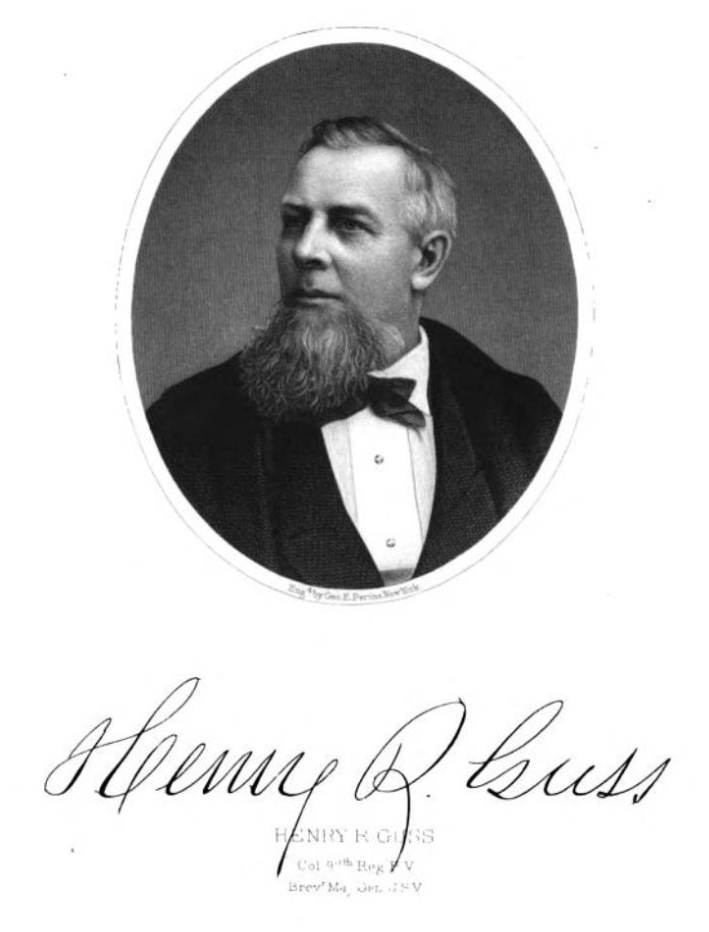
- Henry Ruhl Guss
- Born: July 28, 1825; Chester Springs, Pennsylvania, US
- Died: April 25, 1907 (aged 81); West Chester, Pennsylvania, US
- Burial place: Oaklands Cemetery, West Chester, Pennsylvania, US
- Military career
- Allegiance: United States of America; Union
- Branch: Union Army
- Service years: 1861–1863
- Rank: Colonel; Brevet Major General
- Unit: 9th Pennsylvania Infantry Regiment
- Commands: 97th Pennsylvania Infantry Regiment
- Conflicts: American Civil War; Second Battle of Fort Wagner; Siege of Fort Pulaski; Battle of Grimball's Landing; Battle of Secessionville

Henry Ruhl Guss (July 28, 1825 – April 25, 1907) was a Union Army officer during the American Civil War. He organized and commanded the 97th Pennsylvania Infantry Regiment out of Chester and Delaware Counties in Pennsylvania. He served as a colonel and was brevetted brigadier general and major general after the war in recognition of his service.

== Early life and education ==
Guss was born on July 28, 1825, in Chester Springs, Pennsylvania, and moved with his family to West Chester, Pennsylvania, in 1836. He was educated at local day schools and at the Joshua Hoopes Academy. He worked in brick manufacturing and was the proprietor of the Green Tree Inn in West Chester.

He founded a volunteer militia company, the National Guards of West Chester, in 1846. He was commissioned first lieutenant of the company by Governor William Bigler on September 11, 1854, and as commanding officer on June 6, 1859, by Governor William F. Packer.

== Military career ==
On April 21, 1861, Guss and over 300 men from the National Guards answered President Abraham Lincoln's call for 75,000 volunteers and marched to Harrisburg, Pennsylvania. Three companies were formed from these troops and became part of the 9th Regiment, Pennsylvania Volunteers. Guss served as captain of company A. On July 29, 1861, the 9th Regiment was mustered out of service.

On July 25, 1861, Guss was commissioned as colonel and given authority from the Secretary of War to raise a regiment from Chester and Delaware Counties which became the 97th Pennsylvania Infantry. The 97th was assigned to the Expeditionary Corps in Hilton Head, South Carolina, under Brigadier General Horatio Gates Wright. Guss and the 97th fought at the Siege of Fort Pulaski, the occupation of Fort Clinch, the Battle of Grimball's Landing and the Battle of Secessionville.

He tendered his resignation on June 22, 1864, and was succeeded by Lieutenant Colonel Galusha Pennypacker. On May 21, 1867, by recommendation of U.S. Congressman John M. Broomall, Guss received a promotion from Secretary of War, Edwin M. Stanton, to brevet Brigadier General and on June 17, 1867, to brevet Major General for faithful and meritorious services in the field during the war.

He served as president of the Society of the Ninety-seventh Regiment of Pennsylvania Volunteers and hosted a reunion in 1884 at the Green Tree Hotel. He was an Uncle to the Old West showman Buffalo Bill.

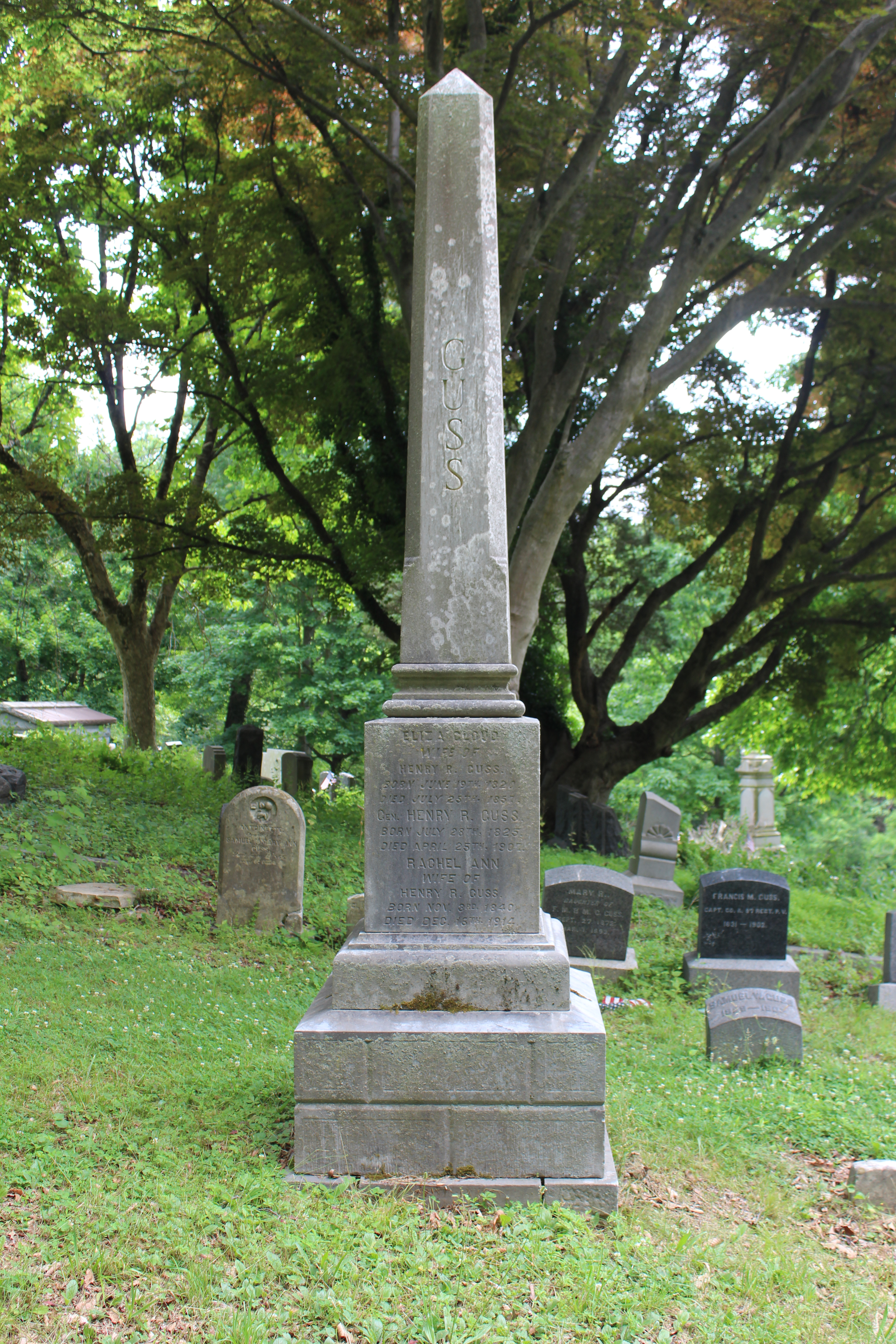
Henry Ruhl Guss tombstone in Oaklands Cemetery

He died in West Chester on April 25, 1907, and was interred at Oaklands Cemetery.

== See also ==
- List of American Civil War brevet generals (Union)
