= 97th Pennsylvania Infantry Regiment =

Union Army infantry regiment

97th Pennsylvania Infantry
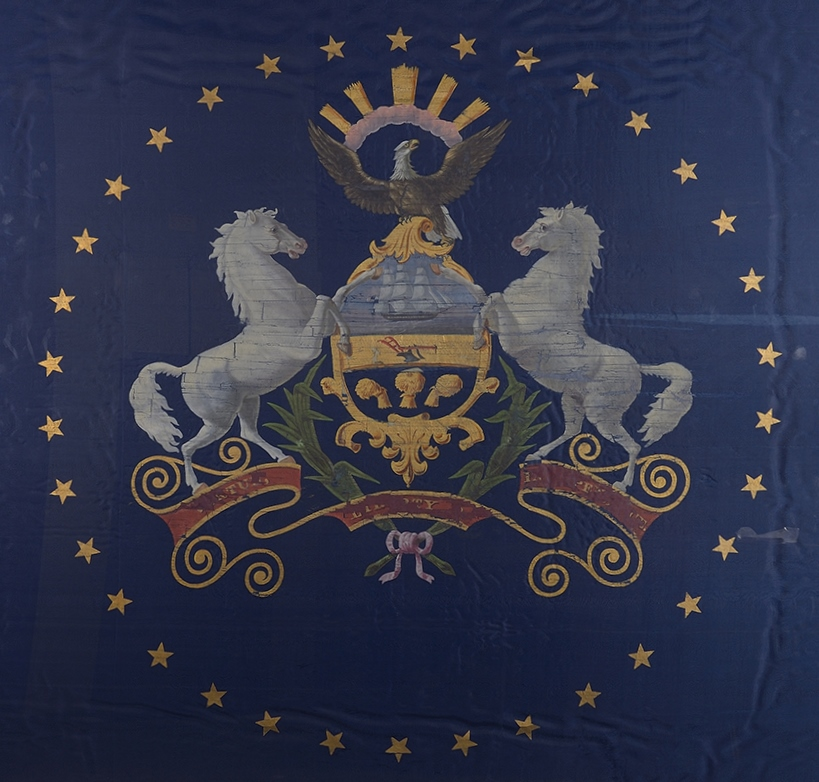
- State flag of Pennsylvania, c. 1863
- Active: August 22, 1861 – September 4, 1865
- Country: United States
- Allegiance: Union
- Branch: Infantry
- Size: 2,004
- Engagements: American Civil War: Battle of Secessionville; Second Battle of Fort Wagner; Second Battle of Charleston Harbor; Bermuda Hundred Campaign; Battle of Cold Harbor; Siege of Petersburg; Battle of the Crater; Second Battle of Deep Bottom; Battle of Chaffin's Farm; Battle of Fair Oaks & Darbytown Road; First Battle of Fort Fisher; Second Battle of Fort Fisher; Carolinas campaign; Battle of Wilmington

The 97th Pennsylvania Infantry was a Pennsylvania militia infantry regiment, mustered into service as a U.S. Volunteer regiment, fought in multiple key engagements of the American Civil War, including the Siege of Fort Pulaski, Bermuda Hundred Campaign, Battle of Cold Harbor, Siege of Petersburg, and the Carolinas campaign.

Following this organization's muster-in during late August 1861, its leaders were presented the regiment's First State Color on November 4 by Pennsylvania Governor Andrew Gregg Curtin. Manufactured by Horstmann Brothers and Company, this flag was initially carried by the regiment's first color-bearer, Sergeant John D. Beaver.

== Service overview ==
The 97th Pennsylvania Infantry was organized at West Chester, Pennsylvania by West Chester resident Henry Ruhl Guss, who received approval from the U.S. Secretary of War in late July 1861 to begin recruiting men to enroll for three-year terms of service. Recruitment commenced August 22. Companies A, B, C, E, F, G, H, and K were composed largely of men from Chester County with Companies D and I staffed by men from Delaware County. The Regimental Band was conducted by George Ellenger and staffed by 22 musicians. Muster-in took place on October 28 at Camp Wayne near West Chester. The initial roster of commanding officers included the regiment's founder, Henry R. Guss, who had been commissioned as colonel; Augustus P. Duer, lieutenant colonel; and Galusha Pennypacker, major. Company Captains were: Francis M. Guss (Company A), William B. McCoy (Company B), Isaiah Price (Company C), W. S. Mendenhall (Company D), William McConnell (Company E), Dewitt Clinton Lewis (Company F), Jesse L. Cummins (Company G), Charles McIlvaine (Company H), George Hawkins (Company I), and William Wayne (Company K).

Transported by rail to Washington, D.C., the regiment was initially stationed at Fort Monroe and attached to the Department of Virginia to December 1861. The remainder of the regiment's duty assignments were: Wright's 3rd Brigade, Sherman's South Carolina Expedition, to April 1862. 1st Brigade, 1st Division, Department of the South, to July 1862. District of Hilton Head, South Carolina, Department of the South, to September 1862. District Hilton Head, South Carolina, X Corps, Department of the South, to April 1863. Stevenson's brigade, Seabrook Island, South Carolina, X Corps, to July 1863. 1st Brigade, 1st Division, Morris Island, South Carolina, X Corps, July 1863. 3rd Brigade, Morris Island, South Carolina, X Corps, to August 1863. 1st Brigade, Morris Island, South Carolina, X Corps, to October 1863. Fernandina, Florida, Department of the South, to April 1864. 1st Brigade, 3rd Division, X Corps, Department of Virginia and North Carolina, to May 1864. 3rd Brigade, 3rd Division, XVIII Corps, to June 1864. 3rd Brigade, 2nd Division, X Corps, to December 1864. 2nd Brigade, 2nd Division, XXIV Corps, to January 1865. 2nd Brigade, 2nd Division, Terry's Provisional Corps, Department of North Carolina, to March 1865. 2nd Brigade, 2nd Division, X Corps, Department of North Carolina, to August 1865.

The 97th Pennsylvania Infantry mustered out August 28, 1865, at Weldon, North Carolina, and were discharged September 4, 1865, at Philadelphia, Pennsylvania.

== Detailed service ==
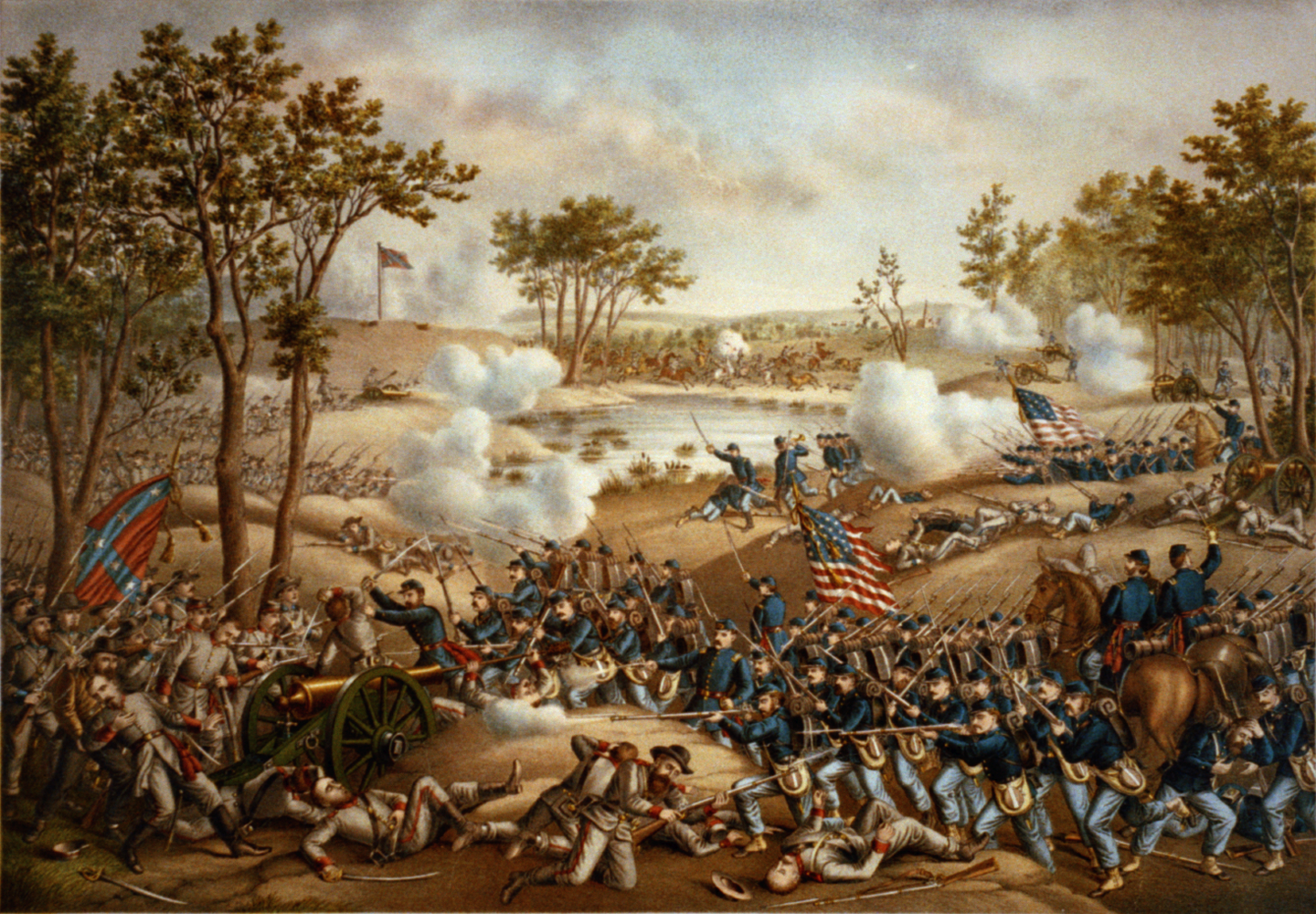
Battle of Cold Harbor, Virginia, May 31-June 12, 1864.

The detailed service of the regiment unfolded as follows:

Moved to Washington, D.C., November 16–17, then to Fortress Monroe, Va., November 20–22. Duty at Camp Hamilton, near Fortress Monroe, Va., until December 8, 1861. Moved to Port Royal, S.C., December 8–11. Duty at Hilton Head, S.C., until January 21, 1862. Operations in Warsaw Sound, Ga., against Fort Pulaski, January 21-February 25. Expedition to Florida February 25-March 5. Occupation of Fernandina March 5, and duty there until March 24. Moved to Jacksonville, Fla., March 24, and duty there until April 9. Moved to Hilton Head, S.C., April 9–14. Expedition to Edisto Island, S.C., April 19–20. Expedition to James Island. S.C., June 1–28. Action on James Island June 10. Battle of Secessionville June 16. Evacuation of James Island June 28, and duty at North Edisto Island until July 18. Moved to Hilton Head, S.C., July 18, and duty there until November 20. At St. Helena Island, S.C., until January 15, 1863. At Hilton Head and Seabrook Point until April. At Seabrook Island until July 8. Expedition to James Island July 9–16. Battle of Secessionville July 16. Moved to Folly and Morris Islands July 17–18. Assault on Fort Wagner, Morris Island, July 18. Siege of Fort Wagner, Morris Island, and operations against Fort Sumter and Charleston July 18-September 7. Capture of Forts Wagner and Gregg, Morris Island, September 7. Duty on Morris Island until October 2. Moved to Fernandina, Fla., October 2–5, and duty there until April 23, 1864. Expedition from Fernandina to Woodstock and Kings Ferry Mills February 15–23, 1864. Moved to Hilton Head, S.C., then to Gloucester Point, Va., April 23–28. Butler's operations on south side of the James River and against Petersburg and Richmond May 4–28. Bermuda Hundred Campaign: Capture of Bermuda Hundred and City Point May 5. Swift Creek or Arrow Field Church May 9–10. Proctor's Creek and operations against Fort Darling May 12–16. Battle of Drewry's Bluff May 14–16. Bermuda Hundred front May 17–28. Chester Station May 18. Green Plains May 20. Movement to White House, then to Cold Harbor May 28-June 1. Battles about Cold Harbor June 1–12. Before Petersburg June 15–18. Siege operations against Petersburg and Richmond June 16 to December 7, 1864. Mine Explosion, Petersburg, July 30 (reserve). Demonstration on the north side of James River at Deep Bottom August 13–20. Strawberry Plains, Deep Bottom, August 14–18. Bermuda Hundred August 24–25. Battle of Chaffin's Farm, New Market Heights, September 28–30. Charles City Road October 7. Battle of Fair Oaks & Darbytown Road October 27–28. In the trenches before Richmond until December 6. Expedition to Fort Fisher, N.C., December 6–27. Second Expedition to Fort Fisher January 3–15, 1865. Assault and capture of Fort Fisher January 15. Sugar Loaf Battery February 11. Fort Anderson February 18–19. Capture of Wilmington February 22. Carolinas campaign: Advance on Goldsboro March 6–21. Advance on Raleigh April 9–13. Occupation of Raleigh April 14. Bennett's House April 26. Surrender of Johnston and his army. Duty at Raleigh until July 10, and at Gaston and Weldon, N.C., until August 28. Mustered out August 28, 1865, at Weldon, N.C.

== Casualties ==
The regiment lost a total of 322 men during service. Six officers and 130 enlisted men were killed or mortally wounded; two officers and 184 enlisted men died from disease-related complications.

== Commanding officers ==
- Colonel Henry Ruhl Guss (October 29, 1861 – June 22, 1864)
- Colonel Galusha Pennypacker (August 15, 1864 – January 15, 1865)
- Colonel John Wainwright (January 15, 1865 – August 28, 1865)

== Notable members ==
- Brosius, Marriott Henry, second lieutenant, Company K: Congressman
- Engle, James E., sergeant, Company I: Medal of Honor recipient
- Lewis, Dewitt Clinton, captain, Company F: Medal of Honor recipient
- McIlvaine, Charles, captain, Company H: Author and amateur mycologist
- Galusha Pennypacker, colonel, Medal of Honor recipient
- Wainwright, John, first lieutenant, Company F, Medal of Honor recipient
- William Wayne, captain: Company K, owner of Waynesborough, great-grandson of General Anthony Wayne

== Reunions ==
In 1884, a dozen former members of the 97th Pennsylvania Veteran Volunteers gathered together at the Green Tree Hotel in West Chester, Pennsylvania on Saturday, February 23, 1884 in order to begin planning for a reunion of the surviving members of their regiment. Present that day were: David Jones C. C. Fahnestock, the regiment's quartermaster and fife-major; F. M. Guss and Leonard R. Thomas, captains of Companies A and C; sergeant Isaac A. Cleaver and privates Oliver B. Channell, Samuel A. March and John J. Still (Company C); sergeant George L. Smith (Company E); brevet-lieutenant-colonel Dewitt Clinton Lewis (Company F); private Evan Pharaoh (Company F); former corporal Barnett R. Rapp (Company K).

Following further planning sessions, during which the organization's name was established as "The Society of the Ninety-Seventh Regiment of Pennsylvania Volunteers", and annual dues were set at $.50 plus a one-time entrance fee of $1.00 per person, the regiment's first annual reunion was held on October 29 of that same year at Camp Wayne in West Chester, Pennsylvania. The stated purpose of the gatherings was to promote "kindly feeling, the revival of old associations, and the collection and preservation of records of the services rendered by this Regiment during the 'War of the Rebellion'".

After assembling at the Fair Grounds at 11 a.m., roughly 200 surviving members of the regiment marched behind their old regimental bandsmen. They then engaged in a business meeting from 11 a.m. to noon, during which the surviving members discussed explored ways to memorialize their service to the nation, including publishing a regimental history and erecting a battlefield monument, and listened to the day's keynote speakers who recalled key moments in the 97th Pennsylvania's history before enjoying a dinner of roast beef, lamb and turkey with rolls and butter, chicken salad, oysters on the shell, chowchow, cranberry sauce, an assortment of fruit, followed by ice cream and cake with coffee and a series of toasts. The event ended at 4 p.m. with a march by the veterans to fife and drum music from Church to High to Market to Gay streets.

== Gallery ==
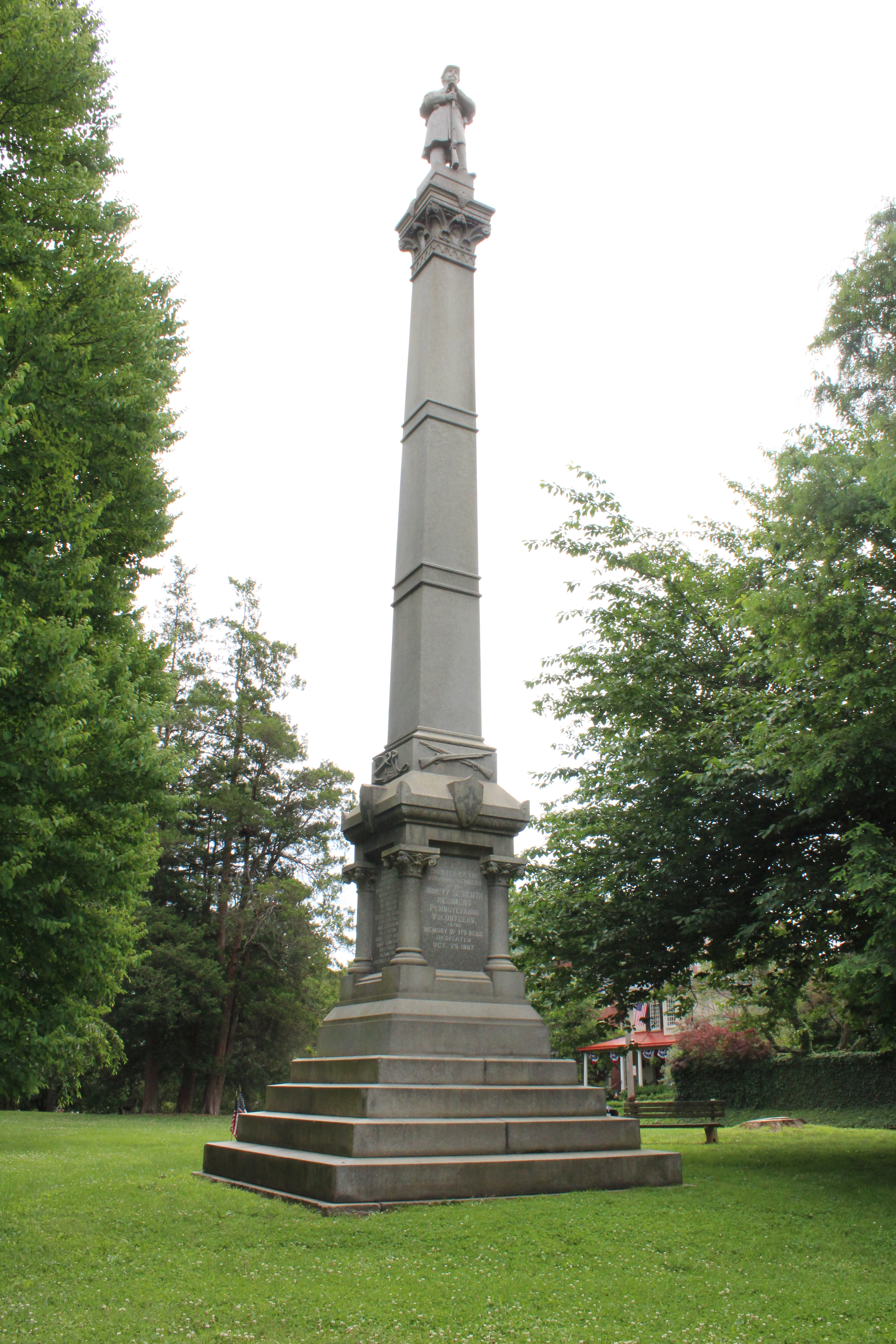
97th Pennsylvania Infantry Regiment Memorial

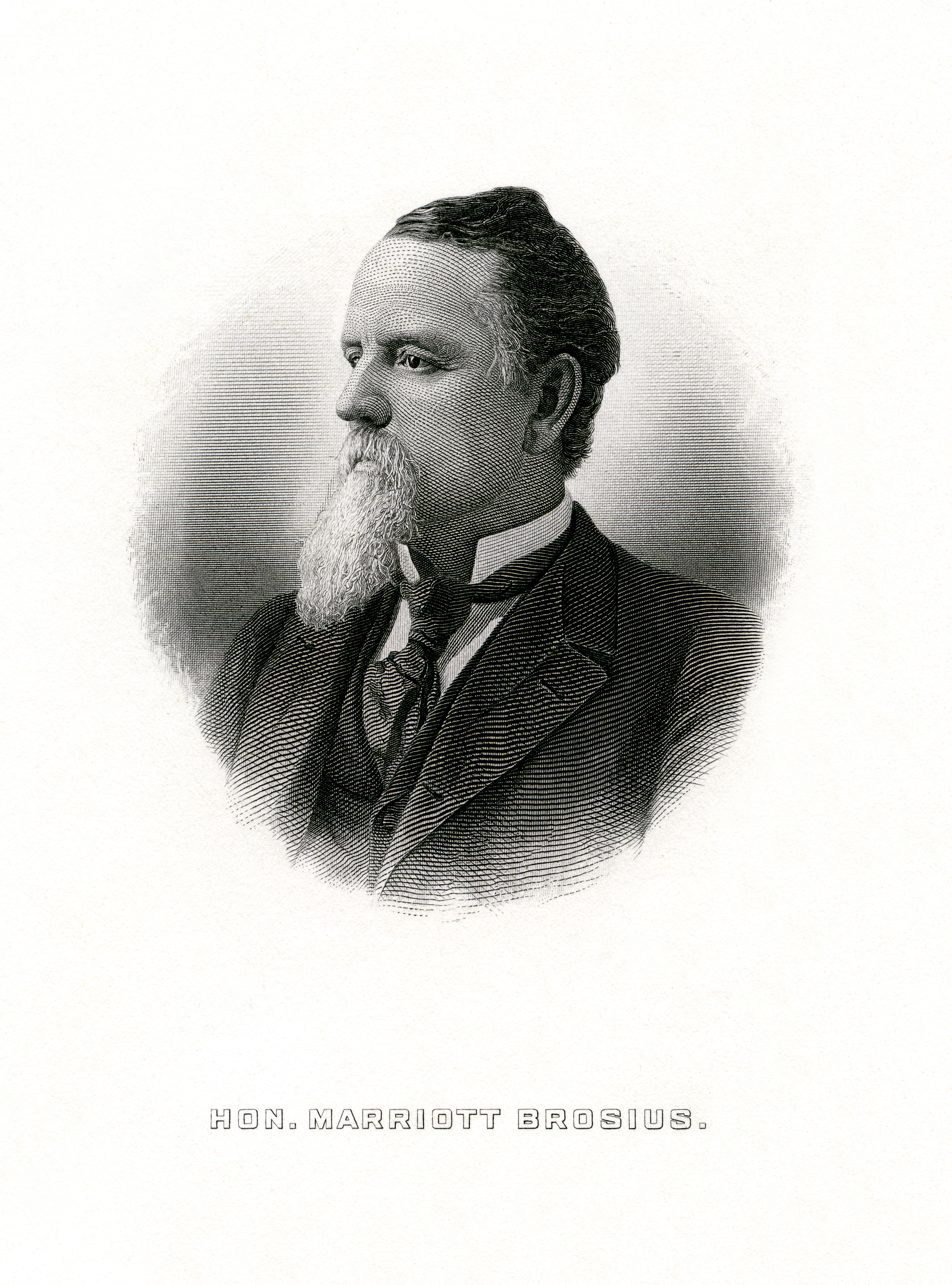
Marriott Henry Brosious

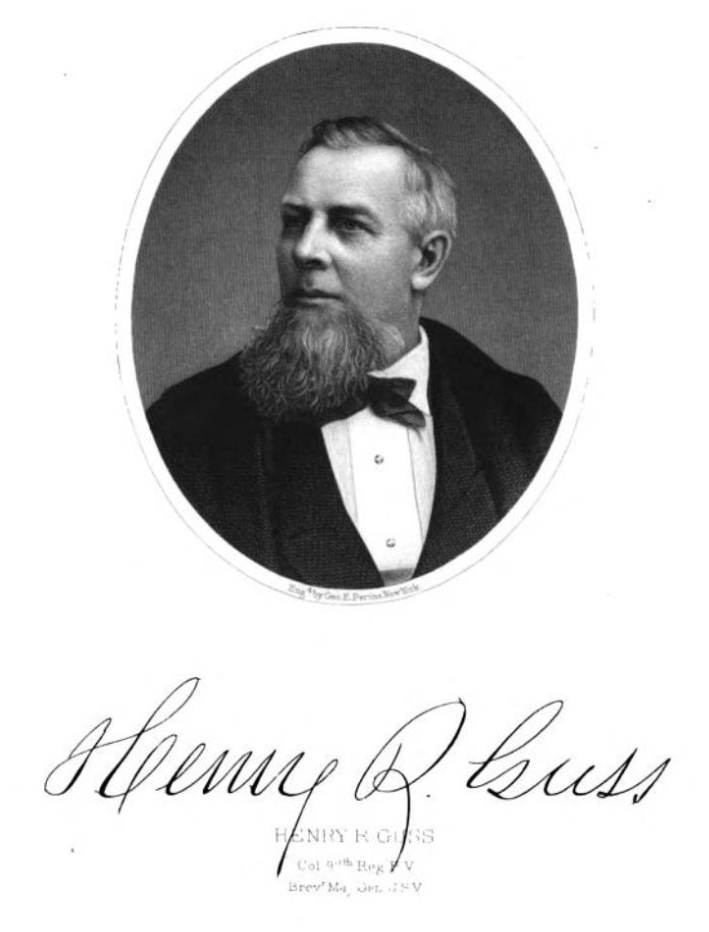
Henry Ruhl Guss

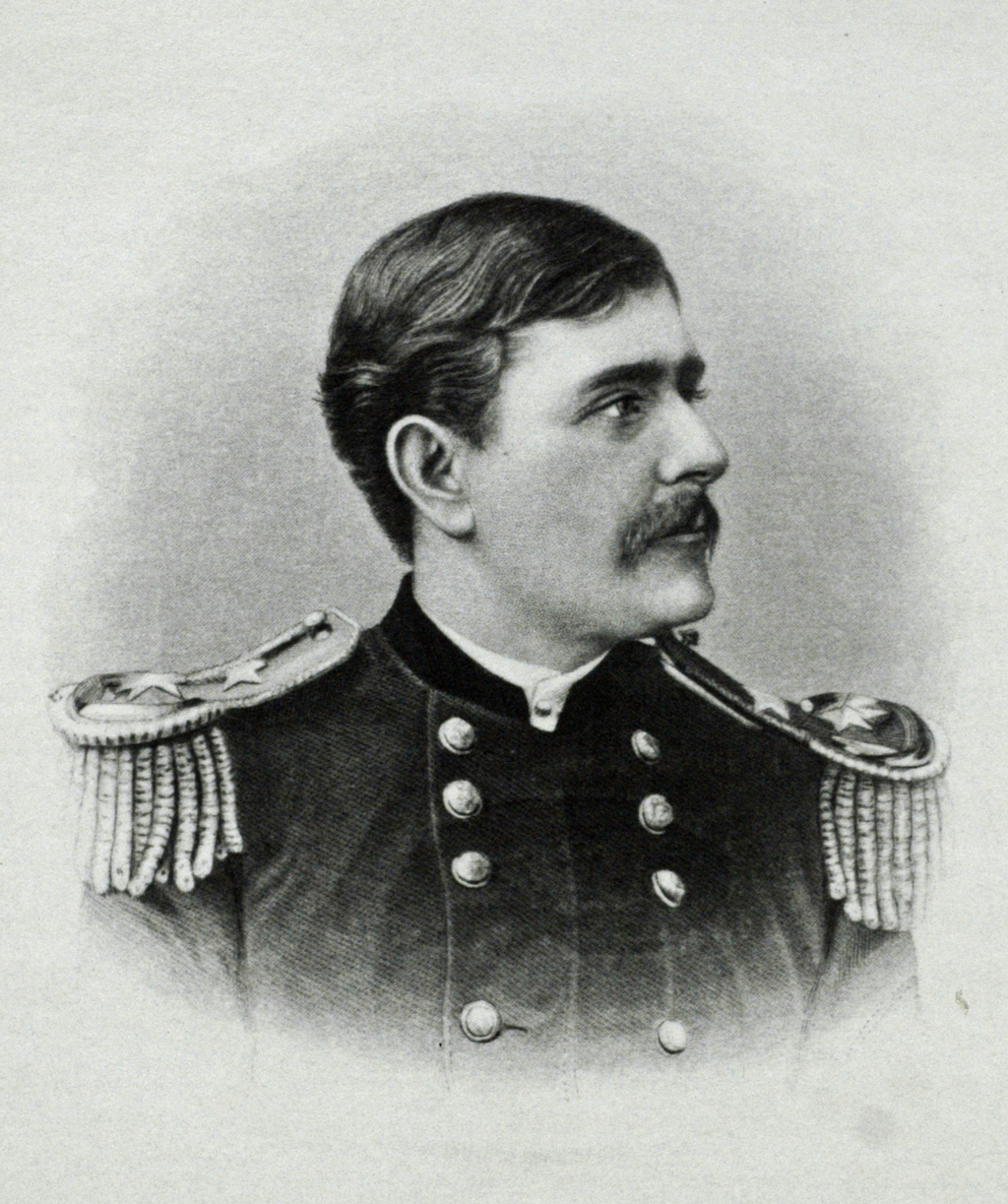
Galusha Pennypacker

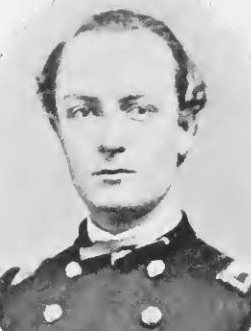
John Wainwright

== See also ==
- List of Pennsylvania Civil War Units
- Pennsylvania in the Civil War
