= 24th South Carolina Infantry Regiment =

- Flag of South Carolina
- Active: 1861 to April 26th, 1865
- Country: Confederate States of America
- Allegiance: Confederate States Army
- Branch: Infantry
- Type: Regiment
- Engagements: American Civil War: Battle of Secessionville; Vicksburg Campaign; Battle of Big Black River Bridge; Battle of Chickamauga; Battle of Missionary Ridge; First Battle of Dalton; Battle of Resaca; Battle of Dallas; Battle of Marietta; Battle of Kennesaw Mountain; Battle of Decatur; Battle of Atlanta; Battle of Jonesborough; Battle of Lovejoy's Station; Battle of Franklin; Battle of Nashville; Battle of Bentonville

Commanders
- Notable commanders: Brig. Gen Clement H. Stevens; Brig. Gen. Ellison Capers

The 24th South Carolina Infantry Regiment was a Confederate infantry regiment in the American Civil War.

== History ==
=== Formation ===
The 24th South Carolina Infantry was formed in the winter of 1861–1862. The first 6 companies, A-F, were commissioned by the governor in Charleston, SC, while the last 4, G-K, where formed in Camp Lightwod in Columbia, SC. Two militia officer where chosen to lead the regiment, Colonel Clement H. Stevens of the 1st SC Militia Rifles and Lieutenant Colonel Ellison Capers of the 16th SC Militia. Most of the companies were from Charleston, Edgefield, and Colleton, with some men hailing from Charleston, Anderson, and Beaufort.

Company: Nickname	District	Captain
A: "Marion Rifles"	Charleston	C. B. Sigwald
B: "Pee Dee Rifles"	Marlboro	Robert Johnson
C: "Company C"	Colleton (George Station)	M. T. Appleby
D: "The Evans Guard"	Beaufort	A.B. Addison
E: "Colleton Guard"	Colleton (George Station)	J. S. Jones
F: "Company F"	Anderson and Abbeville	D. F. Hill
G: "Company G"	Richland	J. H. Pearson
H: "Company H"	Chester	J. A. Thomas
I: "Edgefield Guards"	Edgefield	L. B. Weaver
K: "Company K"	Edgefield	S. S. Tompkins

=== Initial duty ===
First posted to Sullivan's Island, SC to defend Charleston Harbor, the 24th first fought at the Battle of Secessionville, At Secessionville, the 24th, under the command of General Johnson Hagood along with the Eutaw Battalion fought Union regiments like the famous 1st New York Engineer Regiment and Battery B, 3rd Rhode Island Heavy Artillery.

=== Transfer to Mississippi ===
In May 1863 the regiment was transferred to Mississippi, and the 24th joined Gist's Brigade as part of which it fought at the Battle of Jackson on May 14 (Gist's brigade was commanded by Colonel Peyton Colquitt during this battle). After the engagement at Jackson, Gist's Brigade joined the Army of Tennessee. The regiment suffered over 150 casualties at the Battle of Chickamauga, partipcated in the Atlanta campaign, and suffered over fifty percent casualties at the Battle of Franklin. On 9 April 1865, the 24th was consolidated with the 16th South Carolina Infantry Regiment to form the 16/24th Consolidated Infantry Regiment.

=== Surrender ===
The survivors of the regiment surrendered on April 26, 1865.

== Sources ==
- Smith, Timothy B. (2024). The Inland Campaign for Vicksburg: Five Battles in Seventeen Days, May 1–17, 1863. Lawrence, Kansas: University Press of Kansas. ISBN 978-0-7006-3655-6.

== See also ==
- List of South Carolina Confederate Civil War units
