= Clement H. Stevens =

American Confederate States Army brigadier general

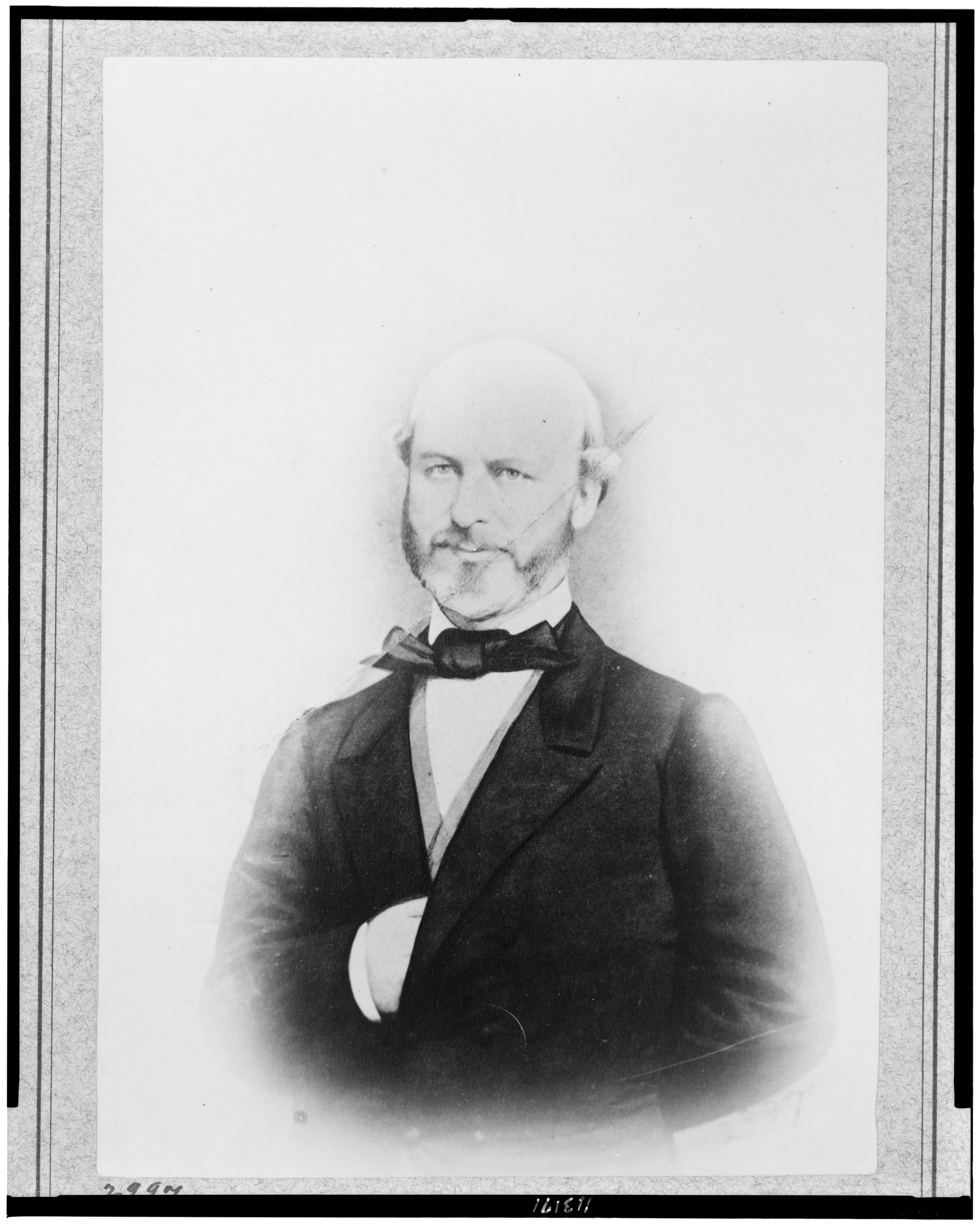
- Born: Clement Hoffman Stevens; August 14, 1821; Norwich, Connecticut
- Died: July 25, 1864 (aged 42); Atlanta, Georgia
- Burial place: Pendleton, South Carolina
- Military career
- Allegiance: Confederate States
- Branch: Confederate States Army
- Service years: 1861–1864
- Rank: Brigadier General
- Nickname: "Rock of Chickamauga"
- Commands: 24th South Carolina Infantry
- Conflicts: American Civil War

Clement Hoffman Stevens (August 14, 1821 – July 25, 1864) was a Confederate States Army brigadier general during the American Civil War. He designed and constructed the iron-clad battery on Morris Island at the mouth of Charleston Harbor which was used in the bombardment of Fort Sumter at the outbreak of the Civil War. He died of wounds received at the Battle of Peachtree Creek.

== Early life and career ==
Stevens was born August 14, 1821, at Norwich, Connecticut. He was the son of a Southern naval officer and his wife who was from South Carolina. They moved the family to Florida when Clement was young and then moved to Pendleton, South Carolina in 1836.

Stevens served several years at sea as secretary to two relatives who were United States Navy officers, Commodore (later Rear Admiral) William Shubrick and Commodore William Bee. Stevens married a sister of future Confederate Brigadier Generals Barnard Bee and Hamilton Bee, his cousins. By 1842, he had become a bank cashier at Charleston, South Carolina. He also became an ordnance expert. In December 1860, when South Carolina seceded from the Union, Stevens also was a member of a railroad construction company.

== American Civil War ==
Stevens became a colonel in the South Carolina Militia before the start of the Civil War. In April 1861, he became a Confederate States Army colonel and aide-de-camp as the state troops came under the command of the Confederate government. He designed and had constructed an iron-plated battery faced with railroad iron on Morris Island for the attack on Fort Sumter in Charleston Harbor.

Stevens became aide-de-camp for his brother-in-law, Brigadier General Barnard Bee, between April 1861 and July 21, 1861 when Bee was killed in action at the Battle of First Bull Run soon after bestowing the nickname "Stonewall" on then Brigadier General Thomas J. Jackson. Stevens also was wounded in the battle.

After he recovered, Stevens took command of a South Carolina militia regiment. On April 1, 1862, Stevens was appointed colonel of the 24th South Carolina Infantry Regiment. Stevens fought at and his regiment helped repulse a Union Army attack at the Battle of Secessionville on June 16, 1862. He was sent with his regiment to Mississippi and participated in the Vicksburg Campaign in Brigadier General States Rights Gist's brigade during General Joseph E. Johnston's unsuccessful efforts to relieve the besieged city. Gist praised Stevens as "iron-nerved." Later with the Army of Tennessee, Stevens was wounded at the Battle of Chickamauga on September 20, 1863. His performance elicited praise in after action reports.

Stevens was promoted to brigadier general on January 20, 1864. Although not fully recovered from his wounds from Chickamauga, he commanded a brigade in Major General W.H.T. Walker's division of I Corps of the Army of Tennessee from February 1864 to July 20, 1864. At the Battle of Peachtree Creek during the Atlanta Campaign, on July 20, 1864, Stevens was shot in the head and mortally wounded while leading a frontal assault late in the evening. Walker also was killed in action in the fighting at Atlanta two days later, on July 22, 1864.

Stevens died at Atlanta, Georgia, July 25, 1864, five days after he was mortally wounded in battle. By the time of his death, Stevens had the nickname of "Rock." Clement Hoffman Stevens is buried at St. Paul's Episcopal Church Cemetery, Pendleton, South Carolina.

== See also ==
- List of American Civil War generals (Confederate)
