= James Edgar Engle =

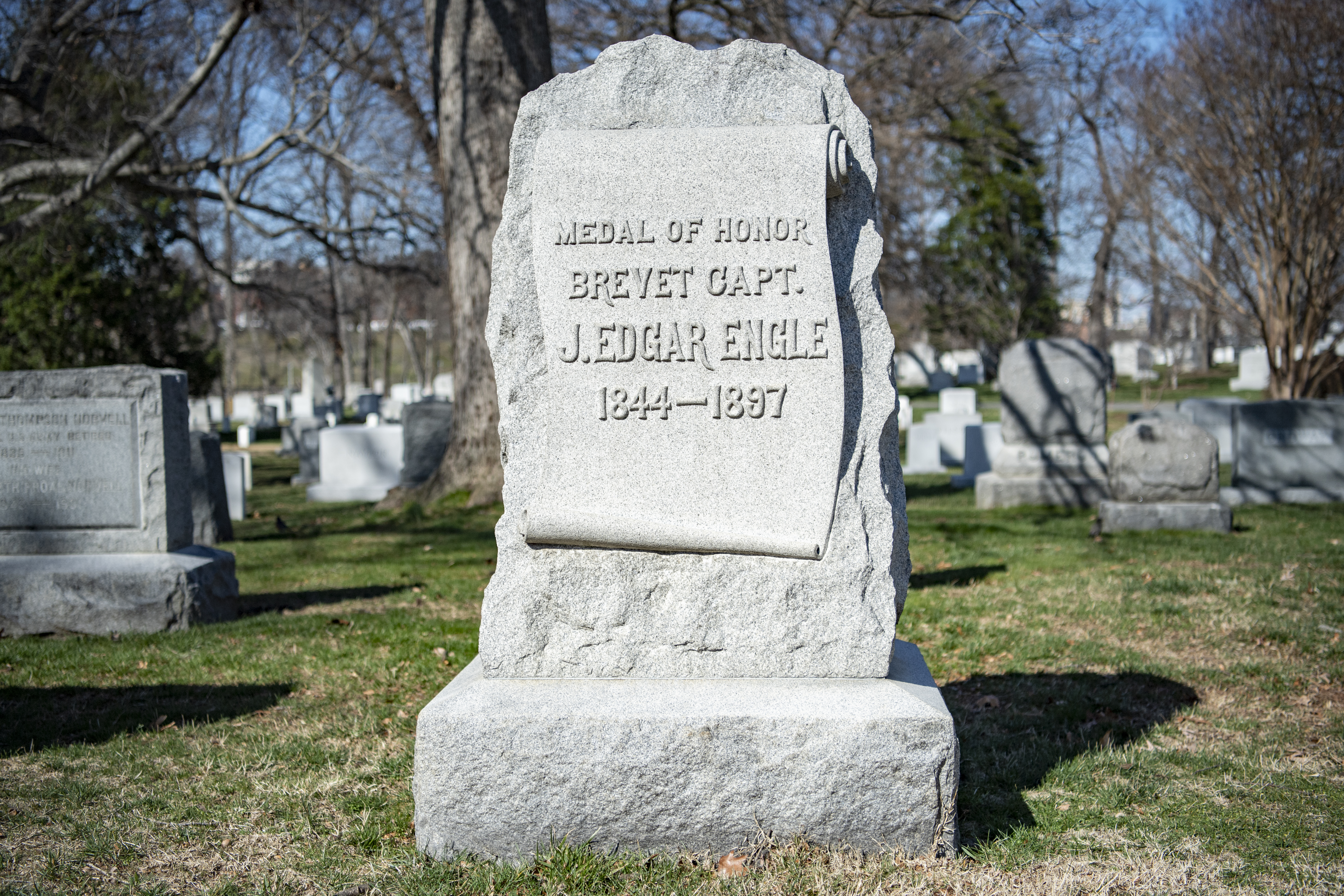
- Grave at Arlington National Cemetery
- Born: c. 1844; Chester, Pennsylvania
- Died: November 19, 1897
- Burial place: Arlington National Cemetery
- Military career
- Allegiance: United States of America
- Branch: United States Army; Union Army
- Rank: Sergeant
- Units: Company I, 97th Pennsylvania Infantry
- Conflicts: Bermuda Hundred Campaign
- Awards: Medal of Honor

Sergeant James Edgar Engle (c. 1844 to November 19, 1897) was an American soldier who fought in the American Civil War. Engle received the United States' highest award for bravery during combat, the Medal of Honor, for his action during the Bermuda Hundred Campaign in Virginia on May 18, 1864. He was honored with the award on December 17, 1896.

== Biography ==
Engle was born in Chester, Pennsylvania, in about 1844. He enlisted in the 97th Pennsylvania Infantry. He died on November 19, 1897, and his remains are interred at the Arlington National Cemetery in Virginia.

== Medal of Honor citation ==
The President of the United States of America, in the name of Congress, takes pleasure in presenting the Medal of Honor to Sergeant James Edgar Engle, United States Army, for extraordinary heroism on 18 May 1864, while serving with Company I, 97th Pennsylvania Infantry, in action at Bermuda Hundred, Virginia. Sergeant Engle responded to a call for volunteers to carry ammunition to the regiment on the picket line and under heavy fire from the enemy assisted in carrying a box of ammunition to the front and remained to distribute the same.

== See also ==
- List of American Civil War Medal of Honor recipients: A–F
