= Charles McIlvaine (mycologist) =

American author and mycologist

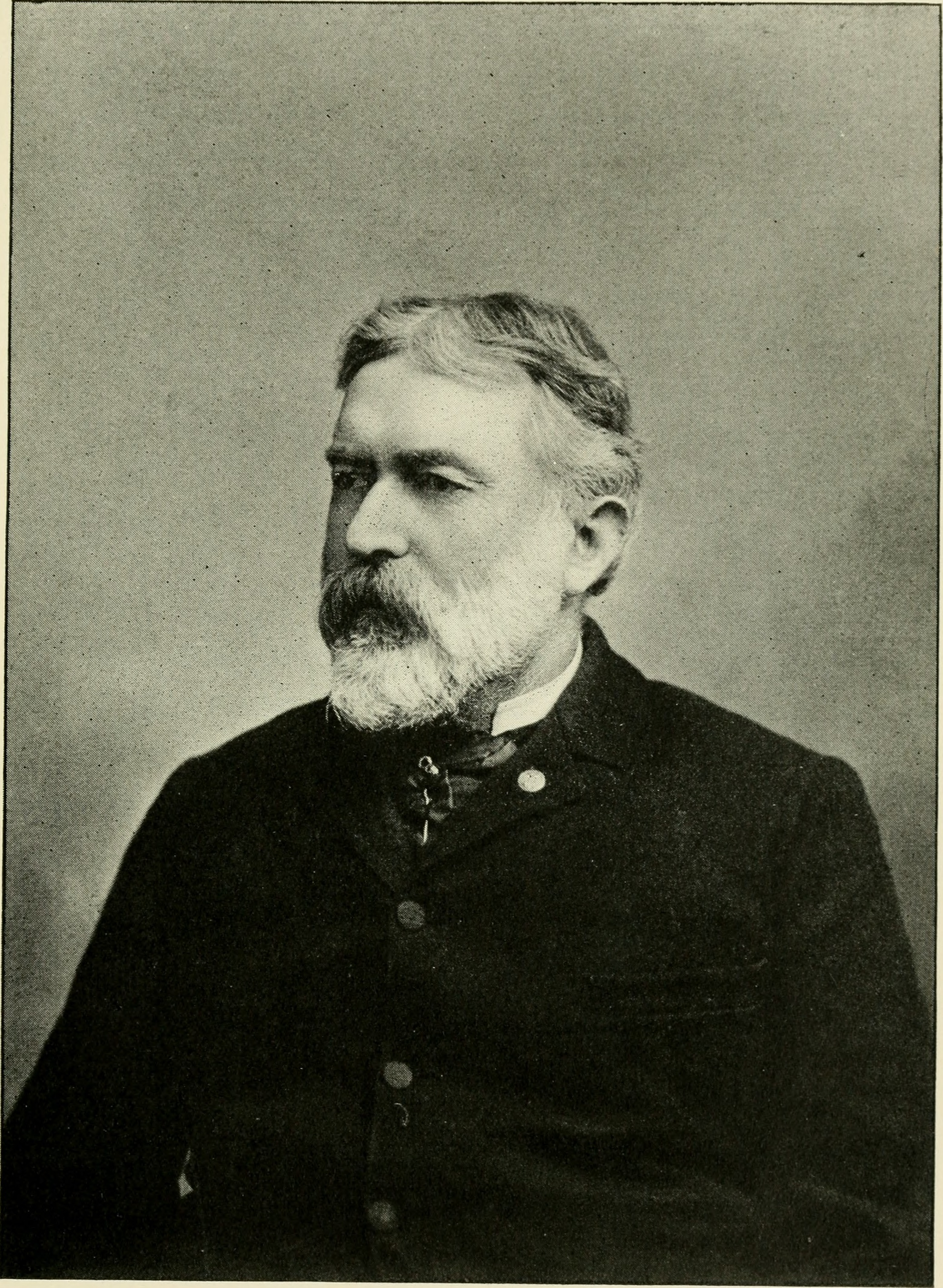
- Born: 1840
- Died: 1909 (aged 68–69)
- Military career
- Allegiance: United States
- Branch: Union Army
- Service years: 1861–1863
- Rank: Captain
- Units: 97th Pennsylvania Infantry, Company H
- Other work: Author; Mycologist

Charles McIlvaine (1840–1909) was a veteran of the American Civil War who retired to become an author and mycologist.

A Pennsylvania railroad man, McIlvaine joined Company H of the 97th Pennsylvania Infantry on October 17, 1861, and rose to the rank of captain before his resignation and retirement from military service on June 10, 1863.

In 1880, he moved to West Virginia and began his post-military career as a minor author and amateur mycologist. Century Magazine, Harper's Magazine, and similar periodicals, as well as by the Detroit Free Press published a mix of sketches, poems and short stories, often written in an approximation of the rural West Virginia dialect. He also wrote at least two book-length works. He used the pseudonym Tobe Hodge for much of his writing.

He is better known for his study of mushrooms. McIlvaine compiled his notes into the book One Thousand American Fungi, still named as a "classic" work of American mycology. He is remembered for his writings supporting the edibility and dietary value of mushrooms. He presided over the Philadelphia Mycological Center which published a bulletin of his results. He consumed hundreds of species, including some (such Russula emetica and Hypholoma fasciculare) that are generally considered poisonous, earning him the nickname 'Old Ironguts'. His experimentation was not without caution, however, and he did not die of mushroom poisoning, but of natural causes.

== Selected works ==
- The Legend of Polecat Hollow. 1887.
- As Hodge, Tobe (April 1887). "For Middle Aged Little Folk – Little Mittens". St. Nicholas Magazine.
- Toadstools, Mushrooms, Fungi Edible and Poisonous. One Thousand American Fungi. How to select and cook the edible; how to distinguish and avoid the poisonous. Indianapolis: The Bowen-Merrill Company. c. 1900.
- Outdoors, Indoors, and Up the Chimney. Philadelphia: The Sunday School Times Company. 1906.

The journal of amateur mushrooming, McIlvainea, published by the North American Mycological Association, is named in his honor.
