= Battle of Secessionville =

Battle of the American Civil War

- Part of the American Civil War
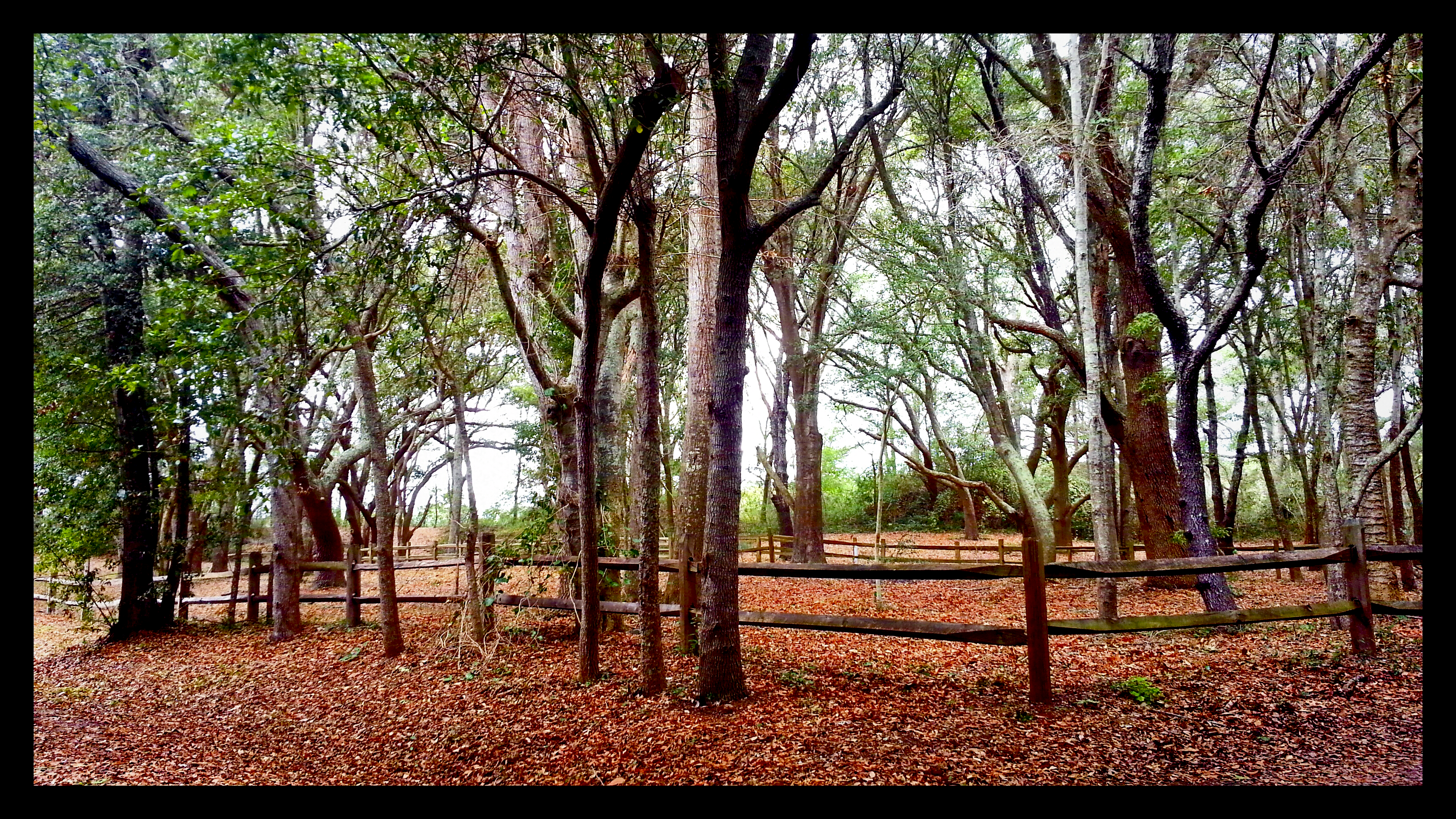
- Secessionville Battlefield
Date	June 16, 1862
Location	Charleston, South Carolina 32°42′14″N 79°56′53″W
Result	Confederate victory

Belligerents
United States (Union)	(Confederate States of America) CSA (Confederacy)

Commanders and leaders
Henry Benham	Nathan G. Evans; Thomas G. Lamar; States Rights Gist

Units involved
North District, Department of the South	2nd Military District of South Carolina; Tower Battery/Fort Lamar Garrison

Strength
6,600	2,000

Casualties and losses
685	204

The Battle of Secessionville (or the First Battle of James Island) was fought on June 16, 1862, during the American Civil War. Confederate forces defeated the Union's only attempt to capture Charleston, South Carolina, by land. It is noted for the court martial of the Union brigadier general Henry Benham for trying to take James Island, which was against the orders given.

== Prelude ==
The importance of Charleston to the Confederate cause, after the Union implemented their Anaconda Plan, can be summarized in the words of Gen. Robert E. Lee, "The loss of Charleston would cut us off almost entirely from communications with the rest of the world and close the only channel through which we can expect to get supplies from abroad, now almost our only dependence." After the Battle of Port Royal, the Union planned an expedition against Charleston, capturing Edisto and John's Island, and by June 2, they had 20 vessels in the Stono Inlet. Union troops on Edisto moved to Seabrook's Island, then across John's Island to Legareville and onto James Island at the Thomas Grimball plantation.

The defenders of Charleston had laid breastworks across the 125-yard-wide peninsula separating Folly Island from Morris Island. This Seccessionville work was referred to as the Tower Battery, because of its reconnaissance platform. Thomas G. Lamar was in command of the battery, while Brig. Gen. States Rights Gist was in overall command of James Island. The battery included a Columbiad, two 24 lb rifled artillery pieces, and several 18 lb guns, all manned by 500 men. Secessionville itself consisted of a few summer homes belonging to the James Island planters.

James Island defenses consisted of Fort Pemberton on the west along the Stono River south of Wappoo Creek, extending southwards to the Tower Battery, and back up to Fort Johnson to the east along the Charleston Harbor. Confederate troops manning the defenses included the 24th South Carolina Infantry Regiment under the command of Col. Clement H. Stevens, the Charleston Battalion (1st South Carolina Battalion) under the command of Lt. Col. Peter Charles Gaillard, Thomas Lamar's 1st Battalion of South Carolina Artillery, the Eutaw Battalion under the command of Lt. Col. Simonton, the Palmetto Battalion under the command of Maj. E. B. White, the 2nd Battalion of South Carolina Artillery under the command of Maj. J. W. Brown, Co. D of the 3rd Battalion South Carolina Cavalry, and the Macbeth Light Artillery. They were joined by the 4th Louisiana Infantry Battalion under the command of Lt. Col. John McEnery, the Pee Dee Battalion (9th South Carolina Battalion) under the command of Lt. Col. Alexander D. Smith, the 47th Georgia Volunteer Infantry and the 22nd South Carolina Infantry Regiment.

== Battle ==
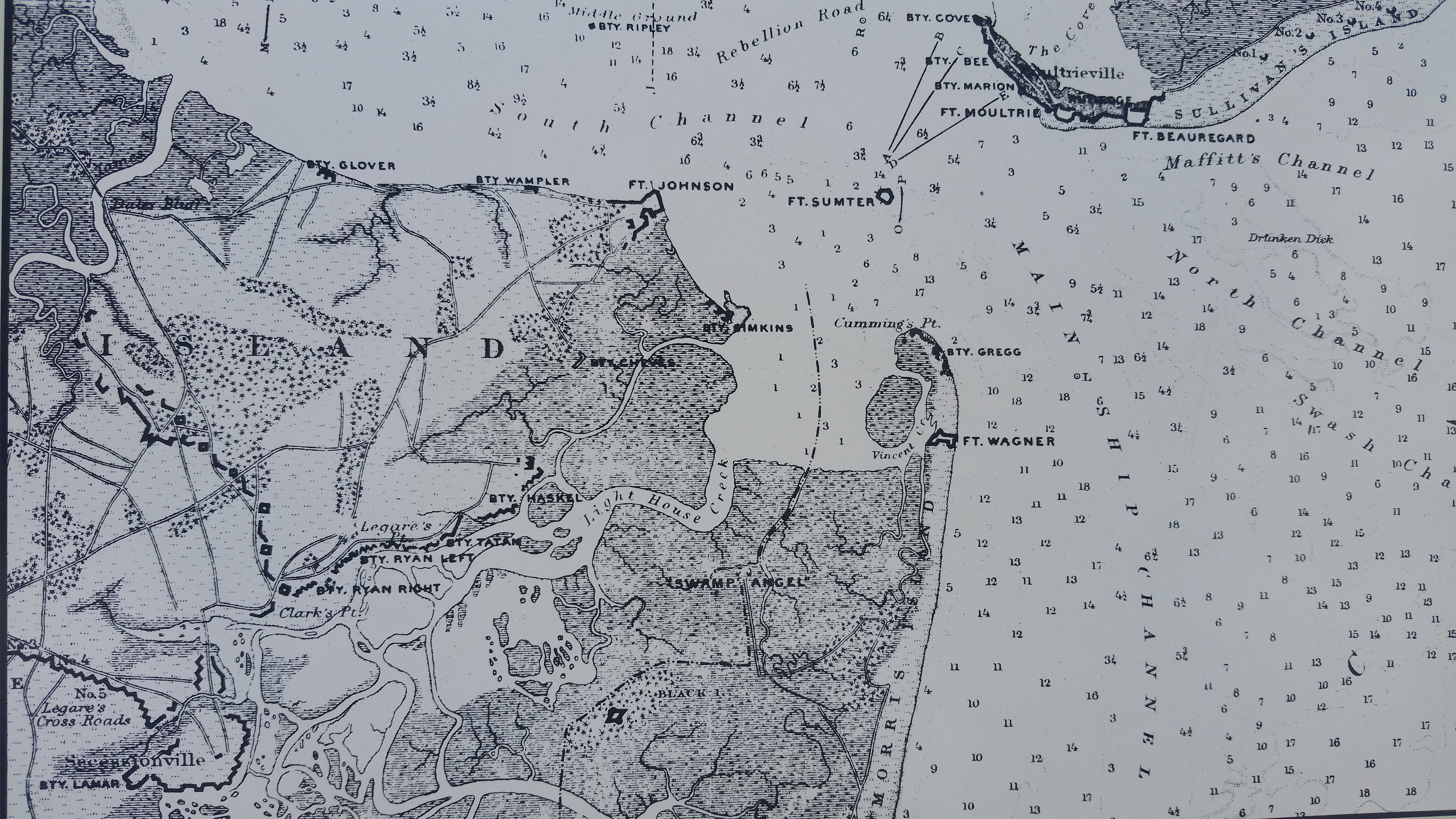
Fort Sumter National Monument marker of the Map of Charleston Harbor defenses showing Secessionville in the lower left

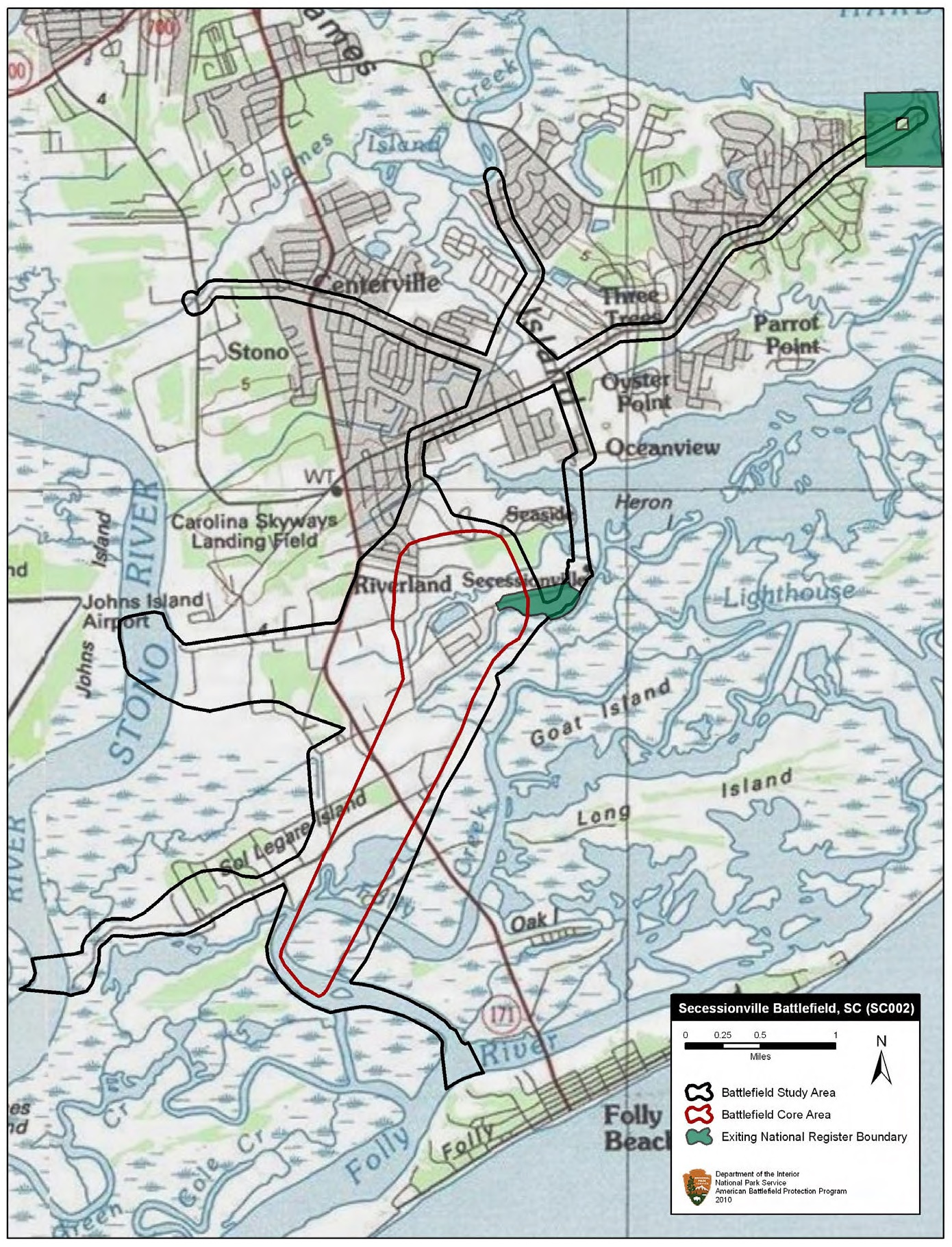
Map of Secessionville Battlefield core and study areas by the American Battlefield Protection Program.

In early June 1862, Union Maj. Gen. David Hunter transported the Union divisions of Brig. Gens. Horatio G. Wright and Isaac I. Stevens, under the immediate direction of Brig. Gen. Henry Benham, to James Island, where they entrenched at Grimball's Landing near the southern flank of the Confederate defenses. Benham landed 6,600 men from the 3rd New Hampshire, 8th Michigan Infantry, 7th Connecticut Infantry, 28th Massachusetts, 100th Pennsylvania Infantry, 46th New York Volunteer Infantry, 3rd Rhode Island Heavy Artillery, and 79th New York "Highlanders" on the southeastern end of James Island, and marched toward Charleston.

On June 10, Gen. John C. Pemberton sent the 1st South Carolina Rifle Regiment and the 4th Louisiana Battalion, under the command of Col. Hagood, supported by the 47th Georgia Volunteer Infantry under the command of Col. Gilbert W.M. Williams, to Grimball's plantation. His intent was to establish a Confederate battery in opposition to the Union gunboats. However, the 47th New York Volunteer Infantry, 45th Pennsylvania Infantry, and the 97th Pennsylvania Infantry put up an effective defense and the Confederates were repulsed.

On June 14, Brig. Gen. Nathan "Shanks" Evans arrived with two regiments and took command of Confederate forces. For the next two days, the Federal and Confederate batteries exchanged fire. Capt. Joshua Jamison's 100-man detachment from the 22nd South Carolina joined the battery on the morning of the 16th.

At about 4:30 a.m. on June 16, the Northern troops attacked the Confederate fort at Secessionville where Colonel Thomas G. Lamar commanded about 500 men who had a number of very heavy artillery guns and a good field of fire. Marshy terrain to the north and south would constrict any Union advance. In the lead was the 8th Michigan and behind them was the 7th Connecticut and the 28th Massachusetts. The 8th Michigan were "mowed down in swaths" from "a shower of musket balls and discharges of grape and canister" from the Confederate cannon, according to one Union officer. Yet, some of the Union infantrymen made it into the fort fighting the Confederate artillerymen hand to hand before Confederate infantry reinforcements arrived to help Lamar's decimated men. These were Lt. Col. Alexander D. Smith's 9th South Carolina Battalion, up from Secessionville. Lt. Col. Peter Gaillard's Charleston Battalion soon followed and the battle became a rifle match along the battery wall and swamp lines. Lt. Col. Joseph Hawley's 7th Connecticut's advance halted when their left flank became mired in the marsh mud and their right received canister and grape. The 28th Massachusetts followed the 7th into the same mire and both regiments became intermingled as the Confederates continued to shoot and shell the confused mass of men. In the meantime, Lt. Col. John McEnery's 4th Louisiana Battalion advanced to reinforce Lamar's garrison, while Simonton's Eutaw Battalion advanced along Battery Island Road to face the Union left flank.

A Union battery, the 1st Connecticut under Capt. Alfred P. Rockwell, finally started firing on the Confederate garrison as the Highlanders of the 79th New York under Lt. Col. David Morrison advanced. Confederate artillery fire forced the 79th to the right flank of the fort where they joined the remnants of the 8th Michigan. The 79th mounted the top of Tower Battery and went over the wall. In the end however, they were repulsed, as had the 8th Michigan before them, when reinforcements failed to appear. The 100th Pennsylvania Roundheads, under the command of Maj. David Leckey, tried to support the Highlanders, but their attack stalled as did the previous ones with Confederate canister and grape. Col. Rudolph Rosa's 46th New York tried to line up on the 100th's left, but some retreated with the fleeing Irish 28th Massachusetts and the 7th Connecticut, while the remainder received Confederate canister. Finally, Col. Daniel Leisure ordered a general retreat. Isaac Stevens ordered the 28th Massachusetts, 100th Pennsylvania, 46th New York, 8th Michigan, 79th New York, and the 7th Connecticut to retreat back towards the hedges. The attack had lasted less than 45 minutes.

Yet, the Union advances were not over. On the other side of the marsh to the north was a piece of land the 3rd New Hampshire under Lt. Col. John H. Jackson, supported by Maj. Edwin Metcalf's 3rd Rhode Island Heavy Artillery, used to advance upon the right flank of Tower Battery. However, 150 yards of marsh prevented any Union advance upon the fort's defenders, while Confederate batteries to the north fired into their backs. By then, the 4th Louisiana had advanced to the fort's defense. Additionally, the Eutaw Battalion had advanced to the 24th South Carolina's east-west picket line off the Battery Island Road, in a heavy thicket north of the Union's 3rd Rhode Island and 3rd New Hampshire. The 3rd New Hampshire were now encircled in a ring of fire, forcing their retreat back to the west, while the 3rd Rhode Island, who had advanced upon the Confederate thicket to the north, were also forced to retreat.

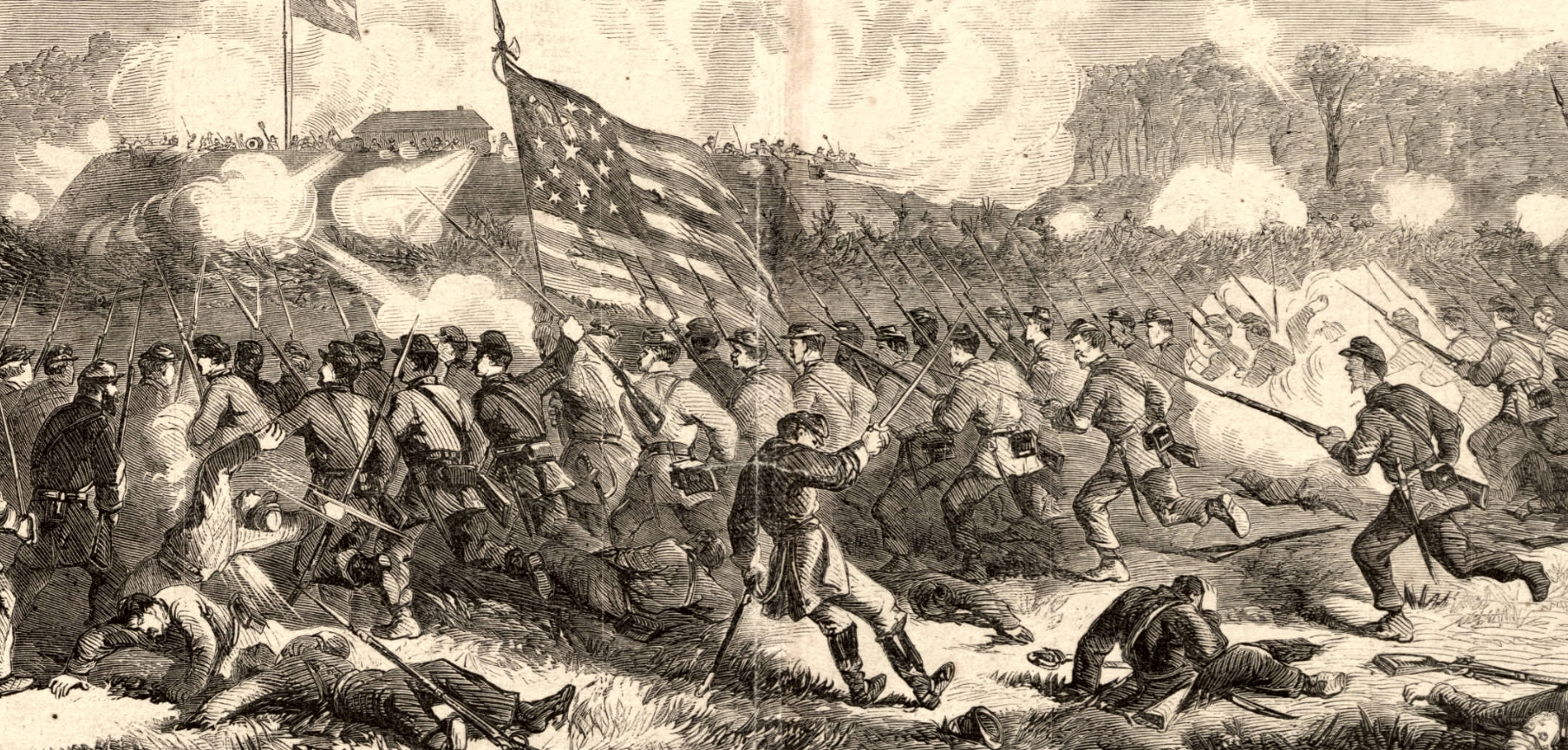
A bayonet charge of Union troops

== Aftermath ==
Thomas Lamar was hailed as "The Hero of Secessionville." While Benham feared further casualties amongst his six shattered regiments after three assaults, and declared the battle a "reconnaissance in force."

Hunter relieved Benham of his command for disobedience, citing the 10 June directive forbidding an attack on Charleston or Fort Johnson, and placed under arrest. On 27 June, Hunter ordered the abandonment of James Island and by 7 July, all Union forces were gone.

On 26 Jan. 1863, Judge Advocate General of the United States Army Gen. Joseph Holt decided Benham's attack was justified and was not prohibited by the 10 June directive. However, Benham would never again be given a field command.

== See also ==
- Secessionville Historic District
- Battle of James Island
