= Battle of Wilmington =

Series of military operations during the American Civil War

Coordinates: 34.1795°N 77.954°W

Wilmington Campaign
- Part of the American Civil War
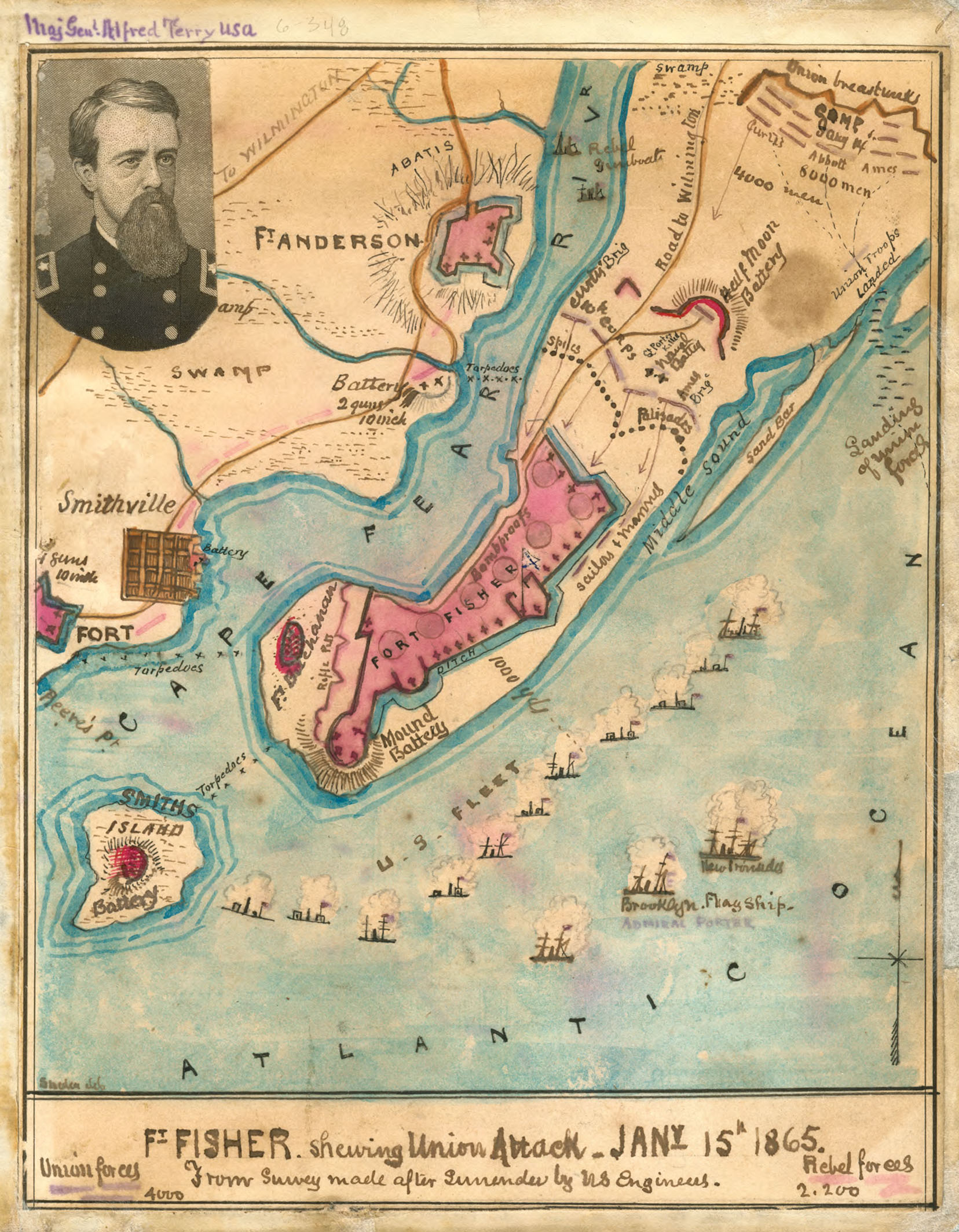
- Union Attack on Fort Fisher, North Carolina, January 15, 1865
Date	February 11–22, 1865
Location	Wilmington, North Carolina
Result	Union victory

Belligerents
United States (Union)	Confederate States (Confederacy)

Commanders and leaders
John M. Schofield; David D. Porter	Braxton Bragg; Robert Hoke

Units involved
Department of North Carolina; Army of the Ohio; North Atlantic Blockading Squadron	Confederate Department of North Carolina

Strength
12,000	6,000

Casualties and losses
305	845

The Battle of Wilmington or the Wilmington Campaign was a series of battles and skirmishes fought February 11–22, 1865, during the American Civil War, mostly outside the city of Wilmington, North Carolina, between the opposing Union and Confederate Departments of North Carolina. The Union victory in January in the Second Battle of Fort Fisher meant that Wilmington, 30 miles upriver, could no longer be used by the Confederacy as a port. It fell to Union troops after they overcame Confederate defenses along the Cape Fear River south of the city. The Confederate General Braxton Bragg burned stores of tobacco and cotton, among other supplies and equipment, before leaving the city, to prevent the Union from seizing them.

== Background ==
After the fall of Fort Fisher, the port city of Wilmington was sealed to any further blockade runners; the Confederates had no remaining major ports along the Atlantic seaboard. Confederate forces evacuated the other defensive works near the mouth of the Cape Fear River; they were forced to disable and abandon the heavy artillery since they lacked the means to move them upriver. While the Confederate defeat at Fort Fisher the previous month affected morale somewhat and led to an increase in desertion, the remaining soldiers also reported that morale remained high. General Braxton Bragg commanded the defenses of Wilmington; his field forces consisted of General Robert F. Hoke's division from the Army of Northern Virginia and some heavy artillery men and home guard. Hoke commanded three of his brigades on the east side of the Cape Fear River, along Sugar Loaf north of Fort Fisher; Hoke's fourth brigade occupied Fort Anderson on the west side of the river. Bragg remained in Wilmington in order to remove a stockpile of government stores and also to prevent the Union forces on the coast from reinforcing Major General William T. Sherman's army.

Union general in chief, U.S. Grant, wanted to use Wilmington as a base for an advance to Goldsboro, North Carolina; rail lines from the coast to Goldsboro could be used to resupply William T. Sherman's armies, which were then moving north through the Carolinas. In February 1865, the Union XXIII Corps arrived to reinforce the Fort Fisher Expeditionary Corps, commanded by Major General Alfred H. Terry. Maj. Gen. John M. Schofield took command of the combined force and started moving against the city in mid-February.

== Battles of Sugar Loaf & Ft. Anderson ==
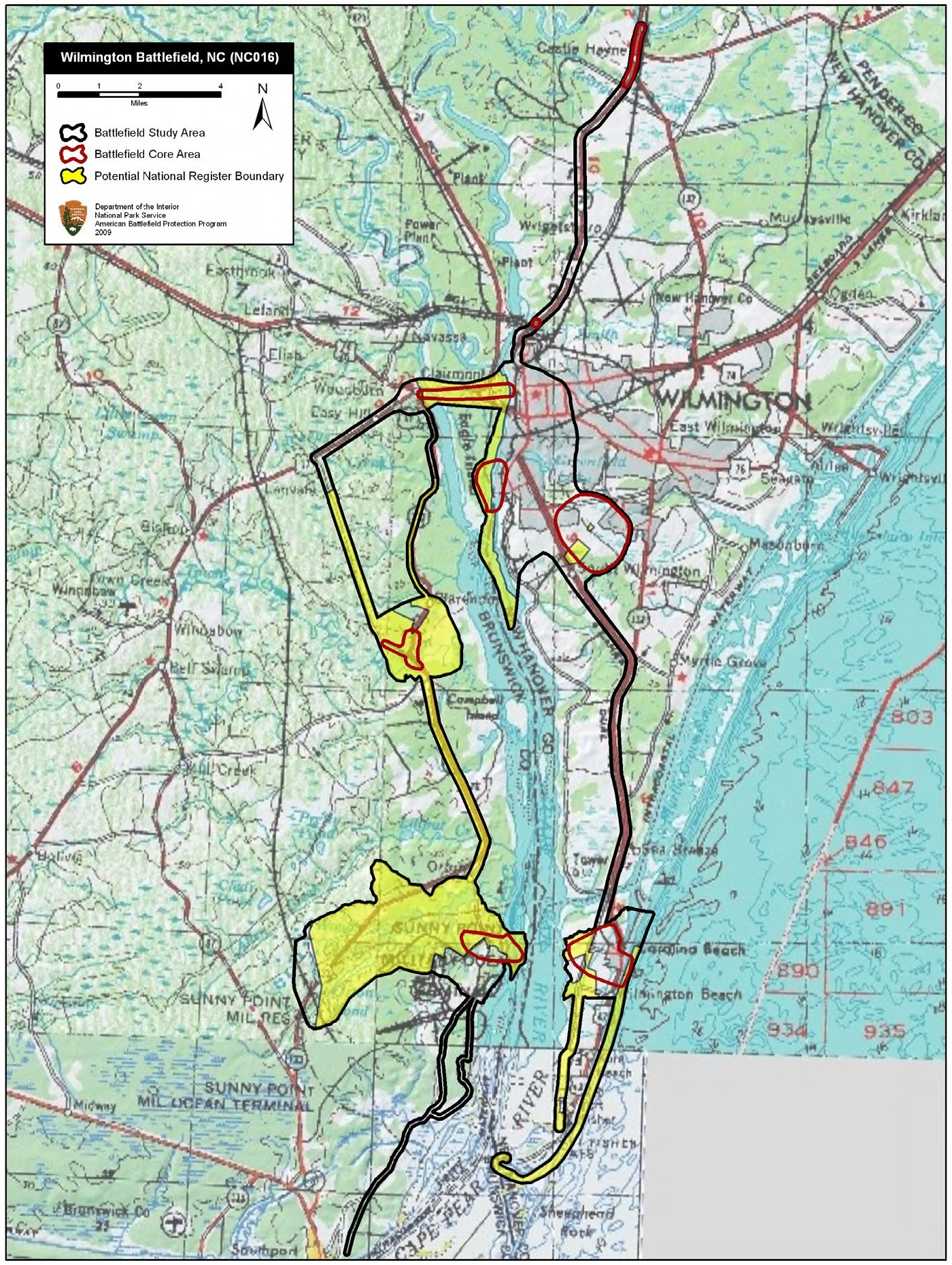
Map of Wilmington Battlefield core and study areas by the American Battlefield Protection Program.

=== Sugar Loaf Line ===
The Battle of Wilmington consisted of three smaller engagements along the Cape Fear River. A Confederate division under Major General Robert Hoke occupied the Sugar Loaf Line north of Fort Fisher. On February 11 Schofield attacked Hoke's Sugar Loaf Line with Alfred Terry's corps; the engagement started in the morning with a bombardment by Union gunboats along the Atlantic side of the fortifications. A half-hour later, Terry started his advance but his left wing was hindered by a swamp located along the river. By late afternoon, Schofield and Terry had overrun the Confederate skirmish line but then concluded that the main Confederate works were too strong to be captured by frontal assault; Schofield decided that he had to capture Wilmington from the western side of the river. Next, Major General Jacob D. Cox's 3rd Division, XXIII Corps was ferried to the west bank of the Cape Fear River to deal with Fort Anderson, the main fortress guarding Wilmington.

=== Fort Anderson ===
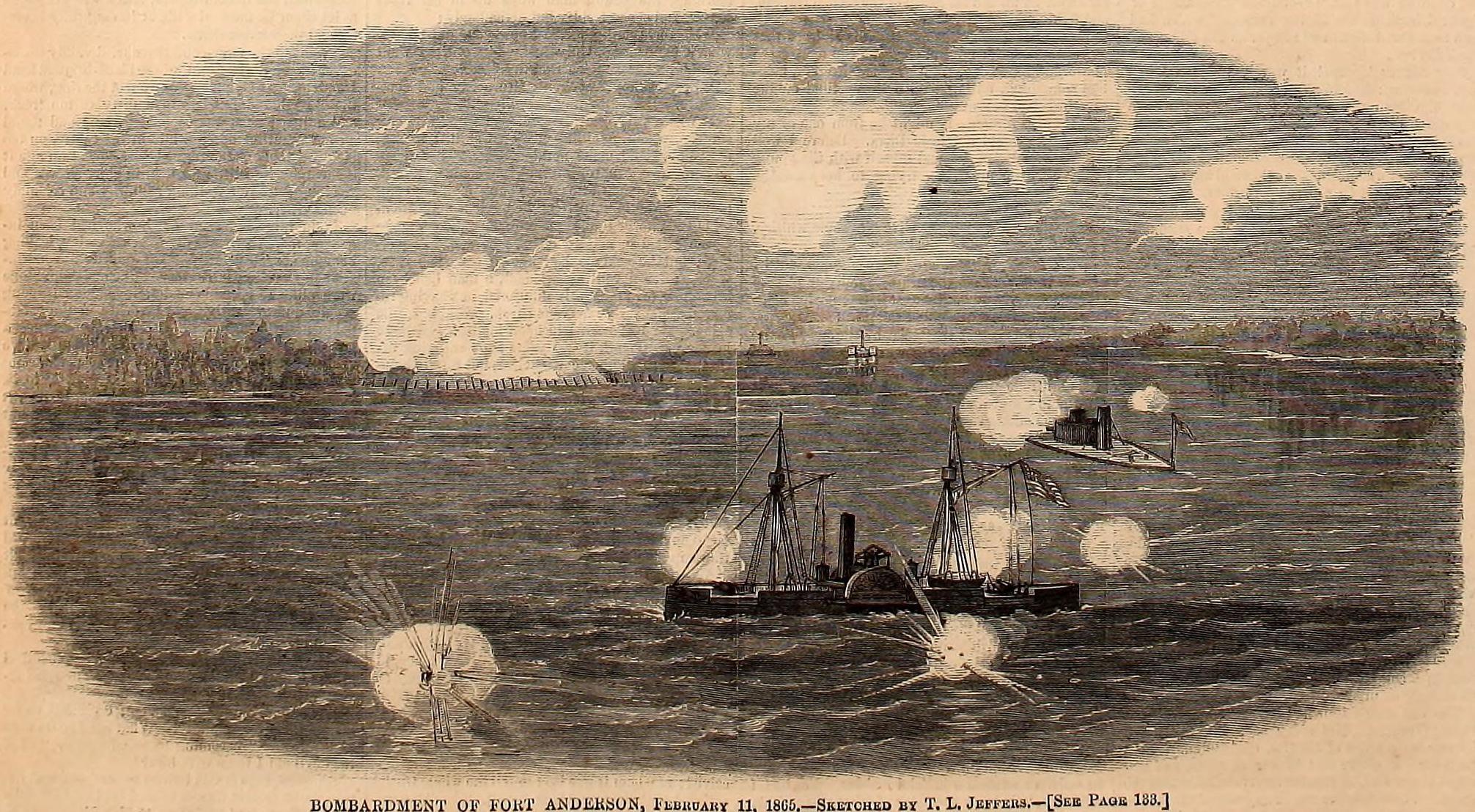
The Bombardment of Fort Anderson, February 11, 1865

Rear Admiral David D. Porter's gunboats sailed up the river and shelled Fort Anderson silencing all twelve guns. Under the direction of Lt. Commander William B. Cushing the Federal Navy constructed a Quaker (or fake) monitor to trick the Rebels into detonating their water mines to make way for Porter's gunboats. Both Cushing and Porter were highly pleased with the success of the ploy. However, later Confederate reports claimed the garrison was expecting a dummy boat and were prepared. Meanwhile, Cox, supported by General Adelbert Ames' division, advanced up the west bank towards the fort. Cox sent the brigades of Colonel Thomas J. Henderson and Colonel Orlando Moore against the garrison itself while Brig. General John S. Casement and Col. Oscar Sterhl marched through the swamps around the Confederate flank. Casement and Sterhl encountered Confederate cavalry and pushed it back after a short fight. The fort's commander, General Johnson Hagood sensed the trap and received permission from Gen. Hoke to pull back to a defensive line along Town Creek to the north. Just as Hagood's troops began their retreat, Henderson's brigade attacked, thus taking the fort rather easily along with a few prisoners.

== Fall of Town’s Creek ==
=== Town Creek ===
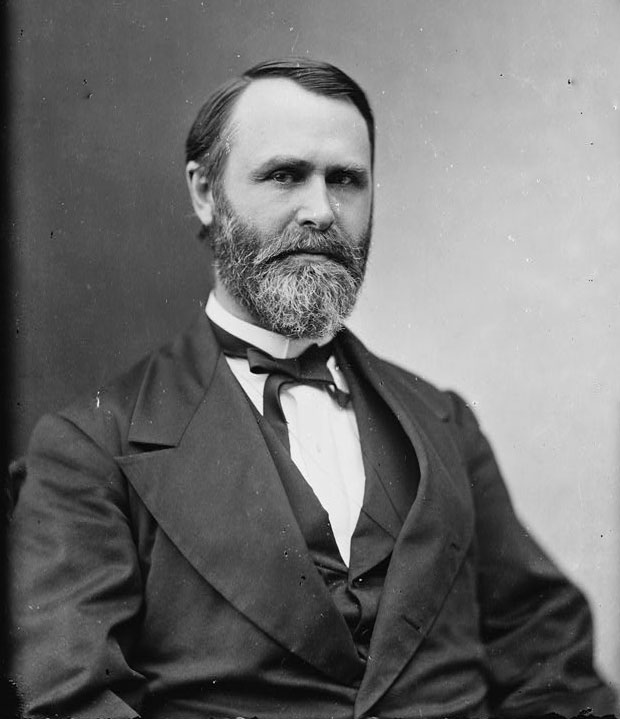
The Union attacks at Fort Anderson and Town Creek were largely directed by Gen. Cox.

Cox pursued Hagood from Fort Anderson, and on February 19 caught up to the Town Creek Line while Hoke's division retreated to a position three miles south of Wilmington, across the river from Hagood's force. Terry followed Hoke cautiously, worried about being surprised by an ambush or by a flank attack from his right. By this time Hoke actually outnumbered Terry as Ames' division was now on the west bank with Cox. Therefore, Ames was ferried back across again as Terry and Porter's fleet started clearing the river of torpedoes. Terry restarted his advance the next day, encountering Hoke's new lines in the afternoon. Once he was convinced that Hoke planned to remain where he was, Terry ordered the Union troops to start building entrenchments while Union gunboats tested the Confederate batteries along the river bank, just west of Hoke's division.

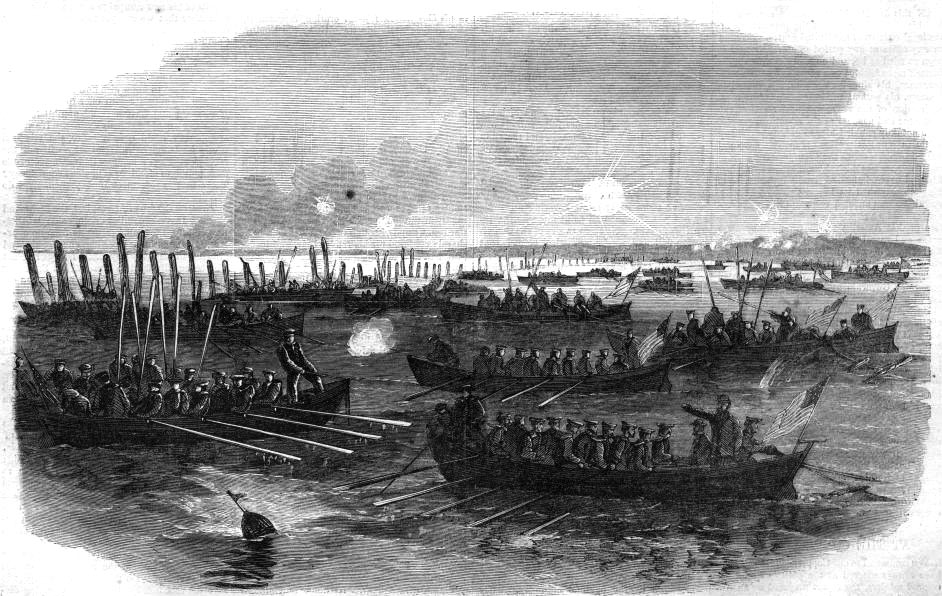
Clearing the river

Hagood had burned the only bridge across Town Creek to slow down Cox, and entrenched on the north side of the river. Cox was eager to attempt his encircling plan that, due to Hagood's retreat at Fort Anderson, the Federals had been unable to complete. The creek was not fordable, so on February 20 Cox's troops found a single flat-bottom boat in the river and used it to ferry three brigades across the creek while the fourth brigade skirmished with Hagood as a diversion. Hagood discovered the flanking movement and decided, since his position was now untenable, to retreat back to Wilmington. He left two regiments to cover his retreat. The Federals then waded through the swamp and attacked the Confederate flank, routing the two regiments, and taking 375 prisoners along with two pieces of artillery. The next day Cox rebuilt the destroyed bridge and Schofield's artillery crossed and along with Porter's gunboats both were within range of the city itself. General Bragg saw the hopelessness of the situation and ordered the city abandoned. On February 21, Cox's division continued its march toward the city but was delayed by the destroyed bridges across the Brunswick River and by Confederate cavalry, while Hoke's division continued to hold off Terry's command. Bragg used the 21st to evacuate Union prisoners located there, while evacuating anything of military value; he also ordered bales of cotton and tobacco burned so that they would not fall into Union hands, along with storehouses, foundries, shipyards, and ships. Bragg retreated with his forces at 1 a.m. on the 22nd; Cox's corps entered the city after 8 a.m., with Terry's forces entering an hour later.

== Battle of Forks Road ==
From February 20-21st, at what is now Halyburton Park and Cameron Art Museum in Wilmington, North Carolina, Robert Hoke's division of roughly 3000 attempted to hold off a force of roughly 8000 Union soldiers (mainly United States Colored Troops). They were forced to fall back to Wilmington and planned to hold the city and have street by street fighting. The Union Army demanded the surrender of the city, saying it would be burned like Richmond and Atlanta. The city surrendered and when it fell, it was the last open Confederate port on the east coast.

== United States Colored Troops (USCT) ==
Along Federal Point Road, a narrow corridor bordered by swampy ground, funneled movement into a confined space, where about 1,600 soldiers of the United States Colored Troops (drawn from the 1st, 5th, 10th, 27th, and 37th Regiments) launched an advance, but were forced to give up ground due to intense artillery canister and musket fire. Fighting continued in the pine woods for roughly a day and a half, with both sides exchanging fire in scattered engagements. The 5th USCT, a unit with a strong combat record and three Medal of Honor awardees among its members, sustained the highest losses, totaling 55 casualties. Their work is commemorated in the form of memorials in Wilmington, such as the "Boundless" sculpture in the PNC USTC Park at the Cameron Art Museum.

== Aftermath ==
The Battle of Wilmington closed the last major port of the Confederate States on the Atlantic coast. Wilmington had served as a major port for blockade-runners, carrying tobacco, cotton, and other goods to places such as Great Britain, the Bahamas, and Bermuda; much of the supplies for the Army of Northern Virginia came through Wilmington. Now with the port closed, the Union blockade was complete; the Confederates were unable to find another port along the Atlantic seaboard to replace Wilmington. Bragg came under severe criticism from the press for the Confederate defeat in the Wilmington Campaign. Several members of the Confederate Congress also directed criticism towards Confederate President Jefferson Davis and called for his resignation. Bragg's forces from Wilmington retreated towards Goldsboro, North Carolina, where it united with other Confederate forces commanded by General Joseph E. Johnston.

The capture of Wilmington gave Sherman's forces a base of supply and a supply route to the sea. Schofield was forced to spend some time repairing the damage caused by the Confederates to the rail lines near the city. He was also forced to use supplies earmarked for Sherman to help paroled prisoners sent to Wilmington and the civilians still living in the city. Schofield's forces were reorganized into the Army of the Ohio and from Wilmington he marched inland to join with Sherman's forces near Fayetteville.

During the Reconstruction Era, Wilmington became a hub of social and economic opportunities for Black Americans. Unlike the majority of Southern cities following the Civil War, Black citizens in Wilmington were freely able to exercise their rights to citizenship, equal protection, and voting, with multiple Black candidates holding office in local government. However, this growth eventually led to a coup d'etat led by white supremacists in 1898, known as the Wilmington Massacre.
