= Battle of Chaffin's Farm order of battle: Union =

The following Union Army units and commanders fought in the Battle of Chaffin's Farm of the American Civil War. The Confederate order of battle is shown separately.

== Abbreviations used ==
=== Military rank ===
- MG = Major General
- BG = Brigadier General
- Col = Colonel
- Ltc = Lieutenant Colonel
- Maj = Major

=== Other ===
- w = wounded
- k = killed

== Army of the James ==
MG Benjamin F. Butler

- Chief of Engineers: Brevet MG Godfrey Weitzel

=== X Corps ===
MG David B. Birney

Division	Brigade	Regiments and Others
First Division; BG Alfred H. Terry	1st Brigade Col Francis B. Pond (w); Col Thomas Mulcahy; Ltc Alvin C. Voris	39th Illinois; 62nd Ohio; 67th Ohio: Ltc Alvin C. Voris; 85th Pennsylvania
First Division; BG Alfred H. Terry	2nd Brigade Col Joseph C. Abbott	6th Connecticut; 7th Connecticut; 3rd New Hampshire; 7th New Hampshire; 16th New York Heavy Artillery
First Division; BG Alfred H. Terry	3rd Brigade Col Harris M. Plaisted	10th Connecticut; 11th Maine; 1st Maryland Cavalry; 27th Massachusetts; 100th New York
Second Division; BG Robert Sanford Foster	1st Brigade Col Rufus Daggett (w); Ltc Albert M. Barney	3rd New York; 112th New York; 117th New York; 142nd New York: Ltc Albert M. Barney
Second Division; BG Robert Sanford Foster	2nd Brigade Col Galusha Pennypacker	47th New York; 48th New York; 76th Pennsylvania; 97th Pennsylvania; 203rd Pennsylvania
Second Division; BG Robert Sanford Foster	3rd Brigade Col Louis Bell	13th Indiana; 9th Maine; 4th New Hampshire; 115th New York; 169th New York
Third Division (incomplete)	1st Brigade BG William Birney	29th Connecticut (Colored); 7th U.S. Colored Troops: Col James Shaw; 8th U.S. Colored Troops: Maj George Wagner; 9th U.S. Colored Troops: Cpt Edward Babcock; 45th U.S. Colored Troops
Artillery	Artillery Brigade Col Richard H. Jackson	1st Battery, Connecticut Light Artillery; 4th Battery, New Jersey Light Artillery; 5th Battery, New Jersey Light Artillery; 1st Pennsylvania Light Artillery, Battery E; 3rd Rhode Island Heavy Artillery, Battery C; 1st U.S. Artillery, Batteries C and D; 1st U.S. Artillery, Battery M; 3rd U.S. Artillery, Battery E; 4th U.S. Artillery, Battery D

=== XVIII Corps ===
MG Edward O. C. Ord (w) September 29
BG Charles A. Heckman
Brevet MG Godfrey Weitzel

Division	Brigade	Regiments and Others
First Division; BG George J. Stannard (w); Colonel Edgar M. Cullen; Colonel James Jourdan	1st Brigade Col Aaron Fletcher Stevens (w); Ltc Thomas Mulcahy temp Sept 29; Ltc John B. Raulston	13th New Hampshire: Ltc Jacob J. Storer; 81st New York: Ltc John B. Raulston; 98th New York: Ltc William Kreutzer; 139th New York: Ltc Thomas Mulcahy
First Division; BG George J. Stannard (w); Colonel Edgar M. Cullen; Colonel James Jourdan	2nd Brigade BG Hiram Burnham (k); Col Michael Donohoe (w); Ltc Stephen Moffitt temp 29 Sept; Col Edgar M. Cullen	8th Connecticut: Ltc Martin B. Smith; 10th New Hampshire: Col Michael Donohoe; 96th New York: Col Edgar M. Cullen, Ltc Stephen Moffitt; 118th New York: Col George F. Nichols
First Division; BG George J. Stannard (w); Colonel Edgar M. Cullen; Colonel James Jourdan	3rd Brigade Col Samuel H. Roberts (w); Ltc Stephen H. Moffitt	21st Connecticut: Capt James F. Brown; 92nd New York; 58th Pennsylvania; 188th Pennsylvania: Maj Francis H. Reichard
Second Division; BG Charles A. Heckman; Col Harrison S. Fairchild; BG Charles A. Heckman	1st Brigade Col James Jourdan; Col George M. Guion	148th New York: Col George M. Guion; 158th New York: Col James Jourdan; 55th Pennsylvania
Second Division; BG Charles A. Heckman; Col Harrison S. Fairchild; BG Charles A. Heckman	2nd Brigade Col Edward H. Ripley	8th Maine; 9th Vermont
Second Division; BG Charles A. Heckman; Col Harrison S. Fairchild; BG Charles A. Heckman	3rd Brigade Col Harrison S. Fairchild	89th New York: Maj Wellington M. Lewis; 2nd Pennsylvania Heavy Artillery: Col James L. Anderson (k)
Third Division; BG Charles J. Paine	1st Brigade Col John Henry Holman	1st U.S.C.T.; 22nd U.S.C.T.; 37th U.S.C.T.
Third Division; BG Charles J. Paine	2nd Brigade Col Alonzo G. Draper	5th U.S.C.T.; 36th U.S.C.T.; 38th U.S.C.T.
Third Division; BG Charles J. Paine	3rd Brigade Col Samuel A. Duncan (w); Col John W. Ames	4th U.S.C.T.; 6th U.S.C.T.
Third Division; BG Charles J. Paine	Unattached	U.S. Sharpshooters
Artillery	Artillery Brigade Maj George B. Cook	2nd New York Light Artillery, Battery H; 3rd New York Light Artillery, Battery E; 3rd New York Light Artillery, Battery K; 3rd New York Light Artillery, Battery M; 7th Battery, New York Light Artillery; 16th Battery, New York Light Artillery; 17th Battery, New York Light Artillery; 1st Pennsylvania Light Artillery, Battery A; 1st Rhode Island Light Artillery, Battery F; 1st U.S. Artillery, Battery B; 4th U.S. Artillery, Battery L; 5th U.S. Artillery, Battery A; 5th U.S. Artillery, Battery F
Bermuda Hundred	Provisional Brigade Col Joseph H. Potter	11th Connecticut Infantry; 40th Massachusetts Infantry; 12th New Hampshire Infantry; 206th Pennsylvania Infantry; 207th Pennsylvania Infantry; 208th Pennsylvania Infantry; 209th Pennsylvania Infantry; 211th Pennsylvania Infantry

=== Cavalry ===
Division	Brigade	Regiments and Others
Cavalry Division; BG August V. Kautz	1st Brigade Col Robert M. West	2nd New York Cavalry; 5th Pennsylvania Cavalry
Cavalry Division; BG August V. Kautz	2nd Brigade Col Samuel P. Spear	1st D.C. Cavalry; 11th Pennsylvania Cavalry
Cavalry Division; BG August V. Kautz	Artillery	4th Battery, Wisconsin Light Artillery

== Sources ==
- Composition is taken from the Official Records
- Eicher, John H., and Eicher, David J., Civil War High Commands, Stanford University Press, 2001, ISBN 0-8047-3641-3.
