= Battle of Chaffin's Farm order of battle =

The order of battle for the Battle of Chaffin's Farm includes:

- Battle of Chaffin's Farm order of battle: Confederate
- Battle of Chaffin's Farm order of battle: Union
