= Lester Archer =

American soldier who received the Medal of Honor

- Born: c. 1838; Fort Ann, New York
- Died: October 27, 1864; Virginia
- Military career
- Allegiance: United States of America
- Branch: United States Army; Union Army
- Service years: 1861 - 1864
- Rank: Sergeant
- Unit: (New York (state)) 96th Regiment New York Volunteer Infantry
- Conflicts: Battle of Chaffin's Farm
- Awards: Medal of Honor

Lester Archer (c. 1838 – October 27, 1864) was an American soldier who received the Medal of Honor for valor during the American Civil War.

== Biography ==
Archer enlisted in the Army from Fort Edward, New York, in December 1861 and was promoted to Sergeant in June 1864. He was posthumously awarded the Medal of Honor on April 6, 1865, for his actions at the Battle of Fair Oaks & Darbytown Road.

== Medal of Honor citation ==
Citation:

Gallantry in placing the colors of his regiment on the fort.

== See also ==
- List of American Civil War Medal of Honor recipients: A-F
