= Frederick H. Dyer =

Soldier and writer (1849–1917)

Frederick Henry Dyer
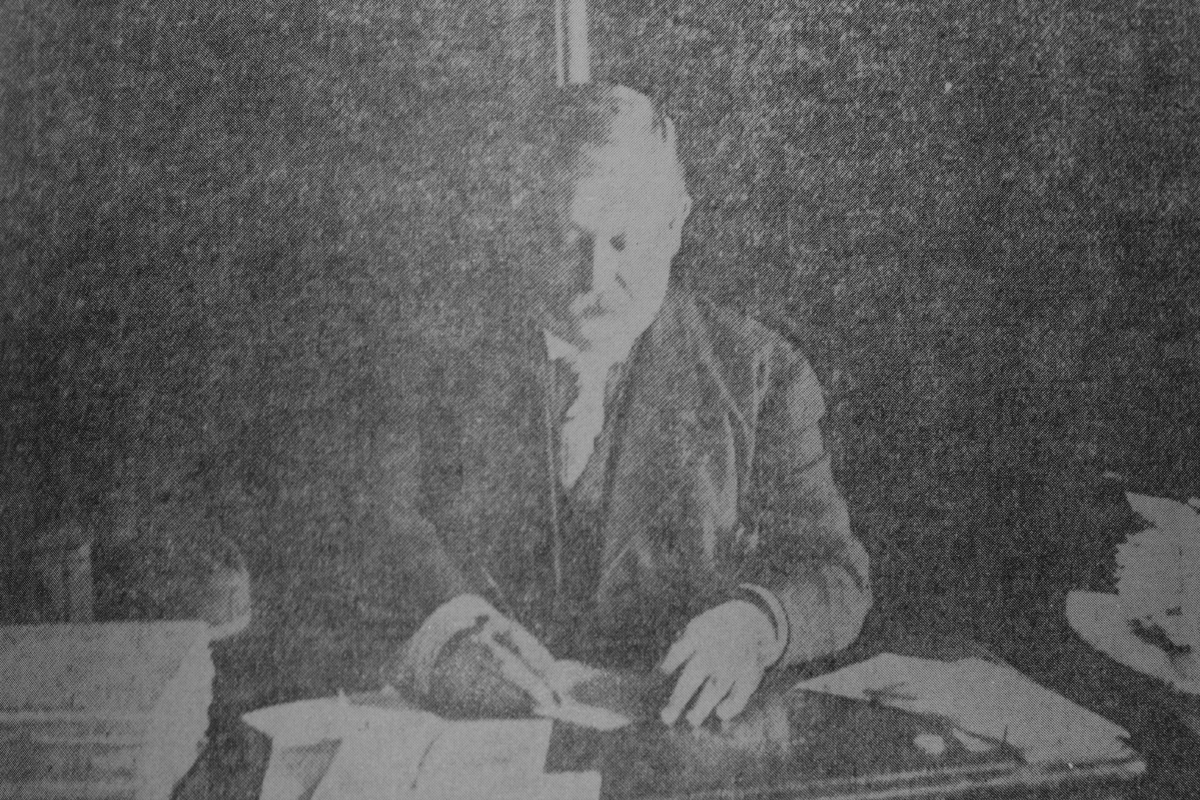
- Dyer working on the Compendium (from Des Moines Register and Leader, 1908)
- Born: July 2, 1849; Greenville, Connecticut, US
- Died: September 21, 1917 (aged 68); Boston, Massachusetts, US
- Burial place: Mount Hope Cemetery
- Military career
- Allegiance: United States; Connecticut
- Branch: Infantry
- Service years: July 25, 1863 - July 20, 1865
- Rank: Drummer Boy
- Nickname: Frederick H. Metzger (pseudonym)
- Units: Company H, 7th Connecticut Infantry Regiment
- Known for: Author of A Compendium of the War of the Rebellion (1908)
- Conflicts: American Civil War: Battle of Olustee; Drewry's Bluff; Bermuda Hundred Campaign; Richmond–Petersburg Campaign; Battle of Chaffin's Farm; Battle of Darbytown Road; Second Battle of Fort Fisher; Battle of Wilmington
- Other work: Drummer boy, printer, writer.

Frederick Henry Dyer (July 2, 1849 – September 21, 1917) served as a drummer boy in the Union Army during the American Civil War. After the war, he wrote A Compendium of the War of the Rebellion – a complete record of every regiment formed under the Union Army, their histories, and the battles they fought in – taking forty years to compile.

== Background ==
Born in 1849, Dyer lost both his parents in childhood. In July 1863, at the age of 14, already two years into the civil war, Dyer and a friend ran away from school with the intention of joining the army. Although his friend's aunt provided guardian consent for him to enlist as a minor, Dyer's friend decided not to sign up. Dyer carefully assumed his friend's surname, Metzger, to avoid being traced and returned to school. On July 25, having passed the routine physical examination, he became a drummer boy in Company "H" of the 7th Connecticut Infantry Regiment.

== Army life ==
Dyer continued to serve with Company "H" during the remaining two years of the war. It is unknown whether he actively participated in any fighting, and most likely would have helped the wounded during engagements. The 7th Connecticut was equipped with Spencer carbines in December 1863, making it better equipped to fight than those armed with the slower muzzle-loaded Enfield rifle.

The regiment saw action in several battles during Dyer's service, including:

- Battle of Olustee – February 4, 1864
- Drewry's Bluff – May 14–16, 1864
- Bermuda Hundred – June 14, 1864
- Richmond–Petersburg Campaign – June 16, 1864 – January 3, 1865
- Battle of Chaffin's Farm – September 29–30, 1864
- Battle of Darbytown Road – October 13, 1864
- Second Battle of Fort Fisher – January 15, 1865
- Battle of Wilmington – February 22, 1865

On July 20, 1865, the regiment was mustered out of service, the war having ended in April.

== Post-war years ==
Dyer stopped using his false name after the war. He attended Russell Military Institute and Hopkins Grammar School in New Haven, Connecticut, reclaiming the education he left to become a soldier.

From the age of 18, he became a commercial traveler – an occupation he maintained for about fourteen years – moving between various cities in the states of Pennsylvania and New York. He moved to Philadelphia in 1870, where he manufactured and sold escutcheons to veterans. In 1875, he was married in Bridgeville, Delaware and moved to Pittsburgh until the fall of 1876, then moved to Washington, Pennsylvania. Whilst living in Washington he went into business with H. Frank Ward, forming "Dyer and Ward – Printers, Stationers and Binders", which ran from 1881 until 1885.

Dyer moved around on business, residing in several cities between 1885 and 1912, before settling his family in Cleveland, Ohio. In 1904 he set up a temporary residence in Des Moines, Iowa, and dedicated himself to working in isolation on the Compendium, compiling his collection of around 10 million names and dates, for almost five intense years.

Dyer remained in Des Moines until 1912, to promote the Compendium from his office, before moving to Boston, Massachusetts, with his family.

== Dyer's Compendium ==
In 1867, Dyer became a member of the Grand Army of the Republic (GAR), a patriotic society of civil war Union veterans. It was around this time that he started to acquire details about Union regiments. His job as a commercial traveller brought him in touch with many veterans and officials, from whom he gathered official figures. The statistics he collected expanded into further areas, from regiments to details of formations, battles, movements, and similar data. He began to research using official records in various state capitals, and continued speaking to ex-soldiers and high-standing officers, such as General Sherman, who expressed interest in a comprehensive compendium and welcomed its future publication.

Dyer utilized the official materials available at the War Department, namely the Official Records of the War of the Rebellion. After 35 years of information gathering, he moved into a single room in Des Moines to start producing a compendium worthy of print. He made seven revisions, each taking around seven months, as he sifted through piles of paperwork and notes, to produce an accurate account of the Union army. Working day and night, sleeping in a bed placed close to his desk, he toiled over the Compendium from 1904 until 1908, producing a 4,025 page typed manuscript. Published on February 15, 1909, by "The Dyer Publishing Company", through which he personally funded, wrote and promoted his work, printed by Torch Press of Cedar Rapids, Iowa, a total of 4,500 copies of the Compendium were issued in a single-volume edition, measuring 9 by 12 inches (imperial octavo), spanning 1,796 pages, and consisting of three parts:

- Part I – Number and organization of the Armies of the United States.
- Part II – Chronological record of the campaigns, battles, engagements, actions, combats, sieges, skirmishes. etc., in the United States 1861 to 1865.
- Part III – Regimental Histories.

Part II also contains 90 photographs of Union soldiers and officers, maps and drawings of uniforms and battles from the civil war, but also includes reproductions of Dyer's 1863 recruitment medical form, and several personal letters. The original Compendium, which was bound in morocco leather and pebbled cloth, sold at $10 apiece (equivalent to $272.81 in 2017 terms).

The Compendium was well-received by civil war veterans and historians alike, who praised both its accuracy and value, as well as its thoroughness when compared to official military records.

== Death ==
Dyer died on September 21, 1917, aged 68, of coronary sclerosis, survived by his wife and one of three children. He was buried at Mount Hope Cemetery, Boston, Massachusetts, in the GAR New Veterans lot on Webster Avenue, in an unmarked grave (no. 125). It was his own request to be interred without a monument, stating that his Compendium would serve as a memory to his life, long after any monument had crumbled away.

== Works ==
Since its original publication in 1908, Dyer's Compendium has been reprinted several times in the U.S. due to its popularity amongst Civil War historians and enthusiasts. Editions are as follows:

- A Compendium of the War of the Rebellion, 1908, Des Moines, IA: Dyer Publishing Co.
  - 1959 – New York: Sagamore Press; Thomas Yoseloff.
    - Includes a new introduction by Bell Irvin Wiley
  - 1978 – Dayton, OH: Broadfoot Publishing Company; Morningside Press
    - Includes a new introduction by Lee A. Wallace Jr.
  - 1979 – Dayton, OH: National Historical Society; Morningside Press
  - 1991 – Bethesda, MD: University Publications of America
  - 1994 – Dayton, OH: Broadfoot Publishing Company; Morningside Press

== See also ==
- Bibliography of the American Civil War
- Bibliography of Abraham Lincoln
- Bibliography of Ulysses S. Grant
