= Henry Barnard (disambiguation) =

Henry Barnard (1811–1900) was an American educationalist.

Henry Barnard may also refer to:

- Henry C. Barnard (1837–?), Wisconsin legislator
- Henry E. Barnard (1837–1919), American lawyer and politician from New York
- Henry Watson Barnard (1792–1855), English cricketer
- Henry William Barnard (1799–1857), British lieutenant-general
- Henry Barnard (judge) (Henry William Barnard, 1891–1881), English High Court judge
- Mike Barnard (sportsman) (Henry Michael Barnard, 1933–2018), English cricketer and footballer

== See also ==
- Harry Bernard (1878–1940), American actor and comedian
