= Joseph Barr Kiddoo =

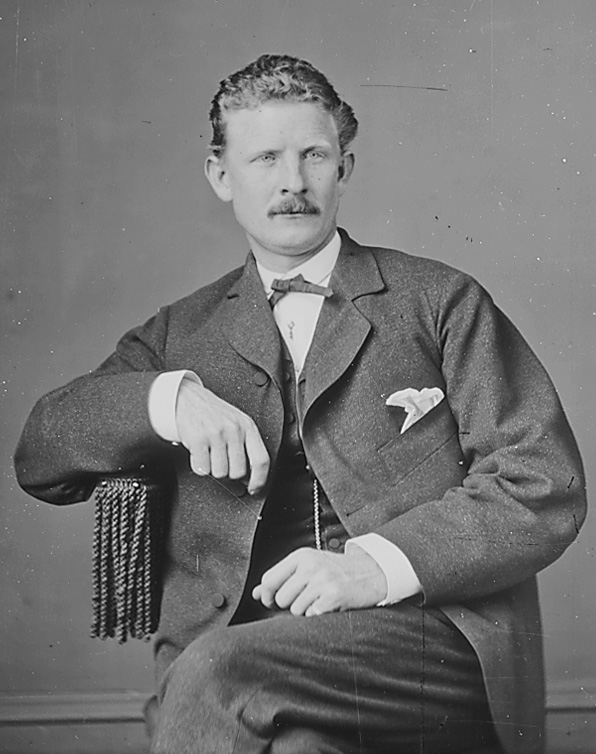
- Gen. Joseph B. Kiddoo
- Born: March 31, 1837; Pittsburgh, Pennsylvania, US
- Died: October 19, 1880 (aged 43); New York City, US
- Burial place: West Point Cemetery; 41.398°N 73.967°W
- Military career
- Allegiance: United States of America
- Branch: United States Army; Union Army
- Service years: 1861–1870
- Rank: Brigadier General
- Unit: 12th Pennsylvania Infantry
- Commands: 137th Pennsylvania Infantry; 6th United States Colored Infantry Regiment; 22nd United States Colored Infantry
- Conflicts: American Civil War; Battle of South Mountain; Battle of Antietam; Battle of Fredericksburg; Battle of Chancellorsville; Siege of Petersburg; Battle of the Crater

Joseph Barr Kiddoo (March 31, 1837 – August 19, 1880) was a Union Army officer in the American Civil War and assistant commissioner of the Freedmen's Bureau in Texas in 1866 and 1867.

Born in Pittsburgh, Kiddoo rose from private to colonel while serving with the Pennsylvania Union volunteers from 1861 to 1863. He then commanded African-American troops for the remainder of the war. After the war, Kiddoo was brevetted brigadier general of volunteers on June 25, 1865 and major general of volunteers on September 4, 1865. He was brevetted brigadier general in the regular army on March 2, 1867 for gallantry and meritorious service while commanding the 22nd United States Colored Infantry Regiment at the Second Battle of Fair Oaks. Kiddoo was retired as a brigadier general on December 15, 1870.

In October 1877, he was one of the eight pallbearers at the funeral of George Armstrong Custer, along with Thomas C. Devin and Randolph B. Marcy. After his death in New York City, Kiddoo was buried at the West Point Cemetery on August 23, 1880.
