= Stephen Moffitt =

American military officer and politician

Stephen Moffitt (August 6, 1837 – January 3, 1904) was an American military officer and politician from Plattsburgh, New York.

== Life ==
Moffitt was born on August 6, 1837, in Clintonville, New York, the son of Irish immigrants Patrick Moffitt and Catharine Mulvy. His father was a cooper and farmer who immigrated to Canada from Fenagh, County Leitrim, in 1831 and moved to Clintonville a year later. His brother was Congressman John H. Moffitt.

Moffitt attended the common schools and the Plattsburgh Academy. When he was fifteen, he became a cabin boy for the Lake Champlain steamer "Francis Saltus" under Captain Lot Chamberlain. He then remained under the employ of the Champlain Transportation Company until the outbreak of the American Civil War, when he opened a recruiting office in Plattsburgh and became the first man to enlist in the 96th New York Infantry Regiment. He enlisted as a private, and when the regiment was mustered he was made first lieutenant of Company B. He was promoted to captain in 1862 when the previous captain died. He was promoted to lieutenant-colonel in May 1863, after which he served on General Henry W. Wessells' staff until 1864. He was also on General John Gibbon's staff and was provost-marshal of the 24th Army Corps from its organization to the end of the war. He was captured at the Battle of Plymouth in April 1864 and sent to Libby Prison, Danville, Macon, and Charleston. In the latter city, he was one of fifty officers placed under fire when the Union fleet bombarded the city. He lost a leg at the Second Battle of Fair Oaks in October 1864, when he was carrying a wounded private from the field. In May 1865, he was commissioned colonel of the regiment and brevet brigadier-general United States Volunteers. He was mustered out with the regiment in February 1866.

Moffitt then moved to Plattsburgh, where he was appointed Deputy Collector of Internal Revenue for Clinton County and part of Essex County. He was elected County Clerk of Clinton County in 1867 and re-elected in 1870. He resigned from that office in January 1873 and was appointed Warden of Clinton Prison. He resigned as Warden in January 1876, and in May of that year he was appointed Collector of Customs for the Champlain district. He was a delegate to the 1872 Republican National Convention and served on the New York Republican State Committee from 1868 to 1873.

Moffitt served as Collector of Customs until 1885. In 1888, he was elected to the New York State Assembly as a Republican, representing Clinton County. He served in the Assembly in 1889. In the Assembly, he introduced and successfully passed a bill to establish the Plattsburgh State Normal School. In 1889, he was again appointed Collector of Customs for the Champlain district. He served in that position until 1893, after he largely retired and spent his summers in Plattsburgh and winters in either California or Florida. He became president of the Iron National Bank of Plattsburgh in 1896.

Prominent in local societies, Moffitt was a member of the Loyal Legion, the Walter H. Benedict Post of the Grand Army of the Republic, and the Society of the Army of the Potomac. He was also president of the Commodore Macdonough Club and assistant treasurer of the Catholic Summer School of America.

Moffitt died at home on January 3, 1904. His funeral at St. John's Church was filled to the doors. The 700 men of the 5th Infantry under the command of Major W. O. Clark marched to meet the funeral procession and acted as an escort to the church. The procession included members of Gibbons Institute, the Walter H. Benedict Post of the Grand Army of the Republic, and the Loyal Legion of Vermont. Following the funerary mass led by Rev. W. S. Kelley, the procession went to Mount Carmel Cemetery, where Moffitt was buried.

New York State Assembly
Preceded by George S. Weed	New York State Assembly; Clinton County; 1889	Succeeded by Alfred Guibord
