= Edward Hall (New York politician) =

American politician (1852–1914)

Member of the New York State Assembly from the Clinton County district
- In office January 1, 1892 – December 31, 1892
- Preceded by: Alfred Guibord
- Succeeded by: Henry E. Barnard

Personal details
- Born: January 1, 1852 Fort Ann, New York, U.S.
- Died: July 14, 1914 (aged 62) Albany, New York, U.S.
- Party: Democratic
- Profession: Politician, civil engineer

Edward Hall (January 1, 1852 – July 14, 1914) was an American civil engineer and politician from New York.

== Life ==
Hall was born on January 1, 1852, in Fort Ann, New York.

After studying civil engineering, Hall moved to Lyon Mountain and worked for Chateaugay Ore and Iron Co. as general manager. He later worked as the active agent in San Domingo for the San Domingo Improvement Co. He was a civil engineer there and helped build and operate a 50-mile long railroad from Puerto to Santiago, leaving when the company ended ties with the country. He also helped build the Delaware and Hudson Railway track between Plattsburgh and Whitehall, worked as assistant engineer in locating and building the state narrow gauge railroad to Dannemora, and laid out and built the Chateaugay road from Dannemora to Saranac Lake.

Hall was town supervisor of Dannemora for ten years and was a member of the 1889 United States Assay Commission. In 1891, he was elected to the New York State Assembly as a Democrat, representing Clinton County. He served in the Assembly in 1892. He later moved to Plattsburgh.

Hall died in Albany City Hospital on July 14, 1914.

New York State Assembly
Preceded by Alfred Guibord	New York State Assembly; Clinton County; 1892	Succeeded by Henry E. Barnard
