= M. W. Wilson =

American politician

Melvin W. Wilson served in the California State Legislature in the Placer County delegation of the State Assembly. He was a republican and on the Committee of Mines and Mining, Retrenchment and State Hospitals in 1878–9. He was a physician and surgeon. He lived in Dutch Flat, California.

He was originally from Massachusetts, lived in Saratoga, New York and moved to California in 1852. He moved back to New York in 1858. He an assistant surgeon of 118th New York Infantry Regiment of the Union Army during the American Civil War for four years. He was in charge of the Relay Hospitals in Maryland.
