= James Daniel Gardner =

American soldier (1839–1905)

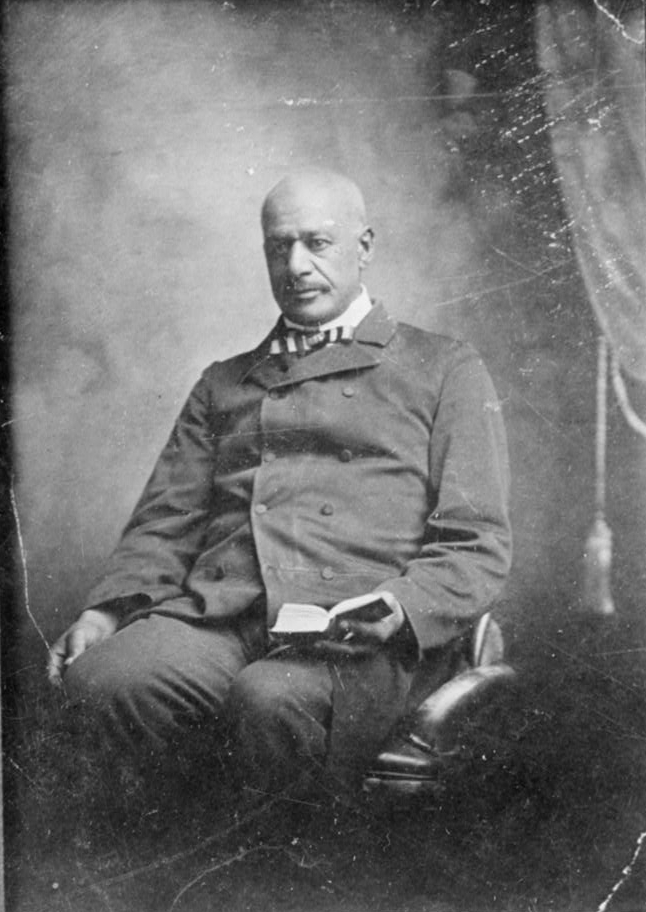
- Sergeant James D. Gardner
- Born: September 16, 1839; Gloucester, Virginia
- Died: September 29, 1905 (aged 66); Clarks Summit, Pennsylvania
- Burial place: Calvary Crest Cemetery, Ottumwa, Iowa
- Military career
- Allegiance: United States of America; Union
- Branch: United States Army; Union Army
- Service years: 1863–1866
- Rank: Sergeant
- Unit: 36th Regiment United States Colored Troops
- Conflicts: American Civil War • Battle of Chaffin's Farm
- Awards: Medal of Honor

James Daniel Gardner, also spelled as Gardiner (September 16, 1839 – September 29, 1905), was an African American Union Army soldier during the American Civil War and a recipient of the United States military's highest decoration, the Medal of Honor, for his actions at the Battle of Chaffin's Farm.

== Biography ==
Gardner was born on September 16, 1839, in Gloucester, Virginia. He worked as an oysterman before enlisting in the Union Army from Yorktown, Virginia, on September 15, 1863. He joined Company I of the 36th Regiment United States Colored Troops as a private. His enlistment papers recorded his surname as "Gardiner."

At the Battle of Chaffin's Farm, Virginia, on September 29, 1864, Gardner's regiment was among a division of black troops assigned to attack the Confederate defenses at New Market Heights. The defenses consisted of two lines of abatis and one line of palisades manned by Brigadier General John Gregg's Texas Brigade. The attack was met with intense Confederate fire; over fifty percent of the black troops were killed, captured, or wounded. During the assault, Gardner advanced ahead of his unit into the Confederate fortifications, "shot a rebel officer who was on the parapet rallying his men, and then ran him through with his bayonet." The day after the battle, Gardner was promoted to sergeant. Several months later and three days before the end of the war, on April 6, 1865, he was issued the Medal of Honor for his actions at Chaffin's Farm.

After the war, Gardner moved with his regiment westward to the Texas frontier, where his service was marred by disciplinary problems. He was reduced in rank to private on July 13, 1865, and was placed in confinement in Brazos Santiago on March 29, 1866. He was mustered out of the Army in Brazos Santiago on September 20, 1866, after three years of service.

He died in Clarks Summit, Pennsylvania, on September 29, 1905, the 41st anniversary of his Medal of Honor action. Aged 66 at his death, Gardner was buried at Calvary Crest Cemetery in Ottumwa, Iowa. A memorial commemorating Gardner, erected in 2005, and unveiled in 2006, was placed in his hometown of Gloucester, Virginia.

== Medal of Honor citation ==
Rank and organization: Private, Company I, 36th U.S. Colored Troops. Place and date: At Chapins Farm, Va., September 29, 1864. Entered service at:Yorktown, Virginia. Birth: Gloucester, Va. Date of issue: April 6, 1865.

Citation:

Rushed in advance of his brigade, shot a rebel officer who was on the parapet rallying his men, and then ran him through with his bayonet.

== See also ==
- List of American Civil War Medal of Honor recipients: G–L
- List of African American Medal of Honor recipients
- Melvin Claxton and Mark Puls, Uncommon valor : a story of race, patriotism, and glory in the final battles of the Civil War, (Wiley, 2006) (ISBN 0471468231)
