= William H. Shoudy =

American politician

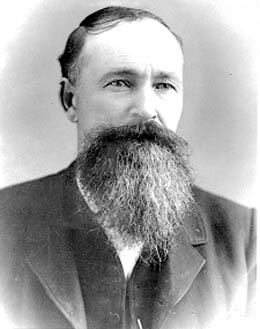

14th Mayor of Seattle
- In office August 2, 1886 – August 1, 1887
- Preceded by: Henry Yesler
- Succeeded by: Thomas T. Minor

Personal details
- Born: May 3, 1830; Syracuse, New York
- Died: September 19, 1901 (aged 71); Seattle, Washington
- Political party: Independent

William H. Shoudy (May 3, 1830 – September 19, 1901) was an American politician who served as the Mayor of Seattle from 1886 to 1887.
