= Thomas T. Minor =

American politician in Washington State (1844–1889)

Thomas Taylor Minor
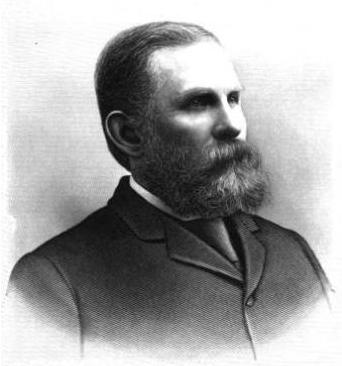

15th Mayor of Seattle
- In office August 1, 1887 – July 30, 1888
- Preceded by: William H. Shoudy
- Succeeded by: Robert Moran

Personal details
- Born: February 20, 1844 Manipay, British Ceylon
- Died: December 2, 1889 (aged 45) Camano Island, Washington, United States
- Party: Republican
- Spouse: Sarah Montgomery
- Children: Elizabeth Montgomery Minor; Judith Strong Minor
- Parent(s): Eastman Strong Minor; Judith Manchester Taylor
- Education: Yale School of Medicine
- Occupation: Physician, Mayor of Seattle, Washington and Port Townsend, Washington and founder of the Seattle, Lake Shore and Eastern Railroad.

Thomas T. Minor (February 20, 1844 – December 2, 1889) was an Ameriican medical doctor, businessman, civic and political leader. He founded the Seattle, Lake Shore and Eastern Railway and served as mayor of Seattle and Port Townsend, Washington.

== Biography ==
=== Early life and ancestors ===
Thomas Taylor Minor was born on February 20, 1844, in Manepy, Ceylon (now Sri Lanka) an island country in South Asia, located about 31 kilometres (19.3 mi) off the southern coast of India. He was a son of Eastman Strong Minor, part of an old and esteemed Connecticut family that descended from Thomas Miner, originally of Chew Magna in North East Somerset, England. An early New England diarist, Thomas Minor arrived on the Lyon's Whelp and helped found New London, Connecticut, and later Stonington, Connecticut. He married Grace Palmer in 1634, daughter of Walter Palmer (Puritan). Eastman Minor was also a descendant, through Jonathan Brewster, of Elder William Brewster (c. 1567 – April 10, 1644), the Pilgrim leader and spiritual elder of the Plymouth Colony and a passenger on the Mayflower.

Eastman was a successful printer in Boston, Massachusetts, when he closed his printing business in October 1833 and traveled with his first wife, Lucy Bailey, to Ceylon. The couple worked as Congregational missionaries, seeking to convert people to Christianity, first in Ceylon, then India, Singapore, and Bangkok. At some point, Eastman married Judith Manchester Taylor, who was born in Madison, Madison County, New York, in 1814, and died in New York in 1900. She was an orphan and the daughter of Isaac and Judith Taylor. She ran the local school in Ceylon, learned Singhalese, and taught it to her two stepchildren as well as her own six children.

In July 1851, Minor and his family returned to the United States and settled in New Haven, Connecticut. Thomas T. Minor attended the local New Haven school.

His half brother was Dr. William Chester Minor (June 1834 – March 26, 1920). Also known as W. C. Minors, he was an American surgeon who made many scholarly contributions to the Oxford English Dictionary. It was while living at Lambeth that Minor murdered George Merrett, after which he was found to be criminally insane and confined for many years at Broadmoor Hospital until his eventual deportation back to America. His life was chronicled in The Surgeon of Crowthorne by Simon Winchester (published in the United States as The Professor and the Madman).

=== Education and war years ===
In 1861, when he was 17, he enlisted in the Union Army as a private in Company G, 7th Regiment Connecticut Volunteer Infantry. He rose to the rank of captain and served as hospital steward and then surgeon. After the war, he entered Yale School of Medicine, graduating in 1867.

=== Marriage and family ===
Minor married Sarah Montgomery on August 20, 1872, in Oregon. Sarah (born May 21, 1840, in Pennsylvania; died June 11, 1931, in Seattle) was the daughter of William Montgomery and Eliza Moorhead. Thomas and Sarah were the parents of two daughters:

- Elizabeth Montgomery Minor, born on May 14, 1874, in Port Townsend, Washington; died November 24, 1958, in Seattle. She married on January 2, 1900, at Seattle's Trinity Episcopal Parish Church, Bernard Pelly, who was born on June 5, 1860, at Little Hallingbury, England, to Justinian Pelly and Fanny Ingleby. The great-nephew of Sir John Pelly, 1st Baronet, Pelly was the British vice-consul (later consul) to Seattle. He died on August 10, 1938, in Seattle.
- Judith Strong Minor (born December 2, 1876, Port Townsend; died July 19, 1959, Philadelphia). On April 15, 1909, in Seattle, she married Lyman Roswell Colt (born January 5, 1868, at Orange, New Jersey; died January 9, 1927, at Winter Haven, Florida). Colt was the son of Mary Beekman Borrows and Morgan Gibbs Colt, who was the son of New Jersey businessman Roswell L. Colt (1779–1856) and first cousin of gunmaker Samuel Colt (1814–1862). Lyman Colt had lived in Alaska and the Yukon and was one of Jack London's acquaintances in Dawson City during the Klondike Gold Rush. He later raised cattle at his small ranch at Chelan in Washington state.

=== Politics ===
In 1868, Minor moved from Nebraska to Port Townsend, where he was an owner and partner in the Marine Hospital. In 1880, he was elected mayor of Port Townsend; he was reelected the following year.

In 1883, he moved to Seattle and joined the Chamber of Commerce. On July 11, 1887 he was elected mayor of Seattle by a substantial majority.

He was active in the territorial and national Republican Party.

=== Death ===
He died, along with his friend George Morris Haller, and Haller's brother-in-law Lewis Cox, on or about December 2, 1889, apparently when their canoe overturned in Saratoga Passage near Camano Island. Minor's body was never recovered. The city of Seattle held a memorial service and a procession on Sunday, December 15, 1899.

=== Descendants ===
- Thomas Pelly Republican politician for many years United States Congressman.
- Charles Moriarty, Jr. (1928–1999), Washington State Representative 1957–1959, Washington State Senator 1959–1966. Son of Charles P. Moriarty, U.S. Attorney in Washington 1953–1961. They are members of the Moriartys and Pellys political families in the United States.

=== Honors ===
The names of Seattle's Minor Avenue and T. T. Minor Elementary School both honor Mayor Thomas Minor.

== Notes ==
Political offices
Preceded by William H. Shoudy	Mayor of Seattle; 1887–1888	Succeeded by Robert Moran
