= Miles James =

American Union Army soldier

- Born: c. 1829; Princess Anne County, Virginia, US
- Died: August 28, 1871 (aged 41–42); Norfolk City
- Military career
- Allegiance: United States; Union
- Branch: United States Army; Union Army
- Rank: First Sergeant
- Unit: 36th Regiment United States Colored Troops
- Conflicts: American Civil War Battle of Chaffin's Farm
- Awards: Medal of Honor

Miles James was an African American Union Army soldier during the American Civil War and a recipient of the Medal of Honor for his actions at the Battle of Chaffin's Farm.

== Biography ==
James joined the Army in Norfolk, Virginia, and by September 30, 1864, he was serving as a corporal in Company B of the 36th United States Colored Troops. On that day, his unit participated in the Battle of Chaffin's Farm in Virginia, where he was seriously wounded, resulting in the amputation of his left arm. Six months after the battle, on April 6, 1865, James was issued the Medal of Honor for his actions at Chaffin's Farm. He was discharged for disability the following October.

== Medal of Honor citation ==
Rank and organization: Corporal, Company B, 36th U.S. Colored Troops. Place and date: At Chapins Farm, Va., September 30, 1864. Entered service at: Norfolk, Va. Birth: Princess Anne County, Va. Date of issue: April 6, 1865.

Citation:

Having had his arm mutilated, making immediate amputation necessary, he loaded and discharged his piece with one hand and urged his men forward; this within 30 yards (27 m) of the enemy's works.

== See also ==
- List of American Civil War Medal of Honor recipients: G–L
- List of African American Medal of Honor recipients
- Melvin Claxton and Mark Puls, Uncommon valor : a story of race, patriotism, and glory in the final battles of the Civil War, (Wiley, 2006) (ISBN 0471468231)
