= Henry Yesler =

American politician

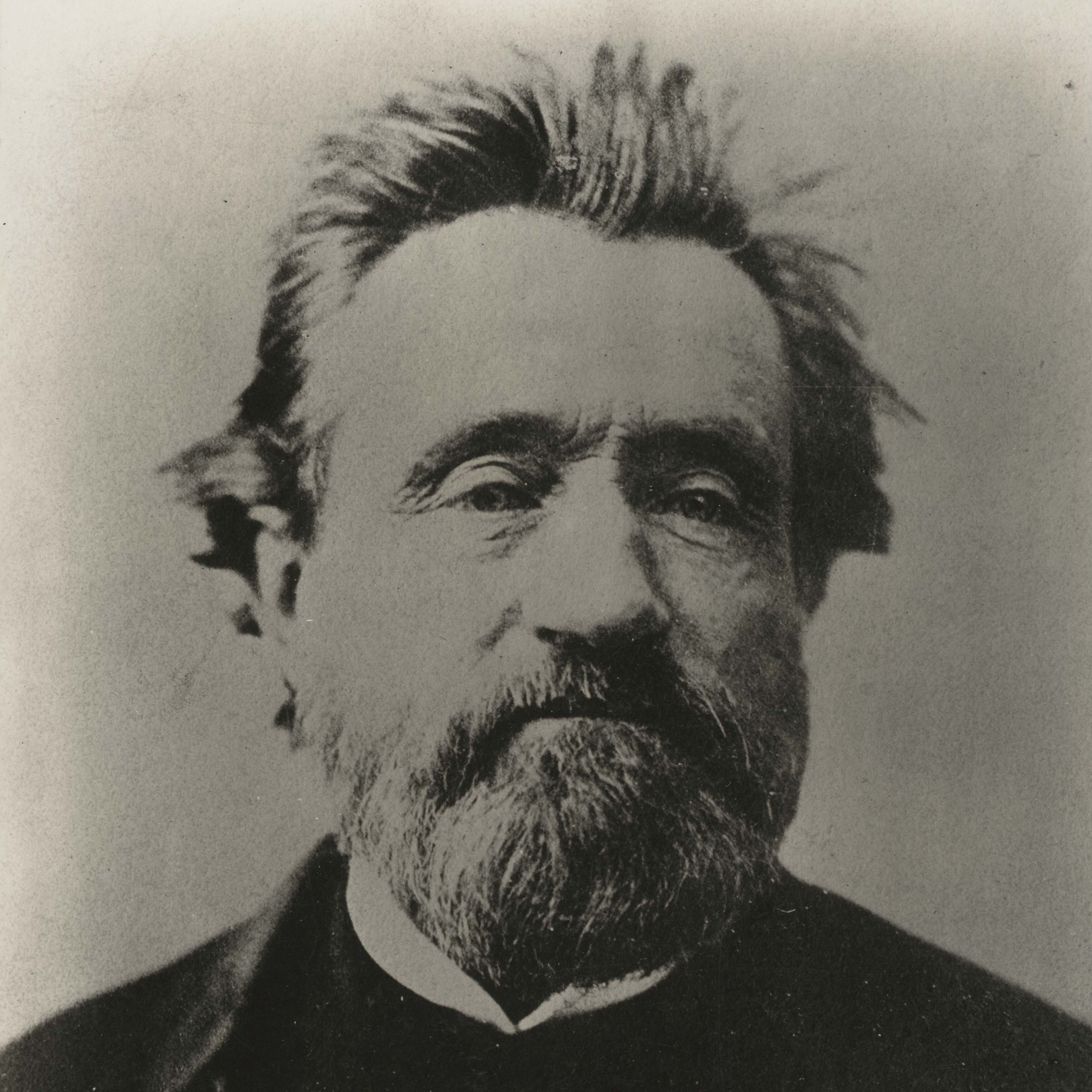
- Yesler in 1870

6th Mayor of Seattle
- In office August 3, 1885 – August 2, 1886
- Preceded by: John Leary
- Succeeded by: William H. Shoudy
- In office August 2, 1874 – August 2, 1875
- Preceded by: John Collins
- Succeeded by: Bailey Gatzert

King County Commissioner
- In office January 1, 1875 – December 1, 1876
- Preceded by: Stephen P. Andrews
- Succeeded by: Terence O'Brien
- In office January 1, 1867 – January 1, 1873
- Preceded by: R. M. Stewart
- Succeeded by: R. Robinson
- In office July 1, 1858 – November 1, 1864
- Preceded by: Edward Hanford
- Succeeded by: John H. Nagle

Personal details
- Born: Henry Leiter Yesler; December 2, 1810 Hagerstown, Maryland, U.S.
- Died: December 16, 1892 (aged 82) Seattle, Washington, U.S.
- Resting place: Lake View Cemetery
- Spouse: Sarah Burgert
- Occupation: Entrepreneur, politician

Henry Leiter Yesler (December 2, 1810 – December 16, 1892) was an American entrepreneur and a politician, regarded as a founder of the city of Seattle. Yesler served two non-consecutive terms as Mayor of Seattle, and was the city's wealthiest resident during his lifetime.

== Biography ==
Yesler arrived in Seattle from Ohio in 1852 and built a steam-powered sawmill, which provided numerous jobs for those early settlers and Duwamish tribe members. The mill was located right on the Elliott Bay waterfront, at the foot of what is now known as Yesler Way and was then known as Mill Road or the "Skid Road," so named for the practice of "skidding" greased logs down the steep grade from the ever-receding timber line to the mill. In running the mill, Yesler built the city's first water system in 1854. The system was made up of a series of open-air, V-shaped flumes perched on stilts that started atop First Hill and ran down past Yesler's residence and to the mill. Later on, after complaints of dirty water, Yesler developed a system made up of log pipes and iron buried beneath the ground.

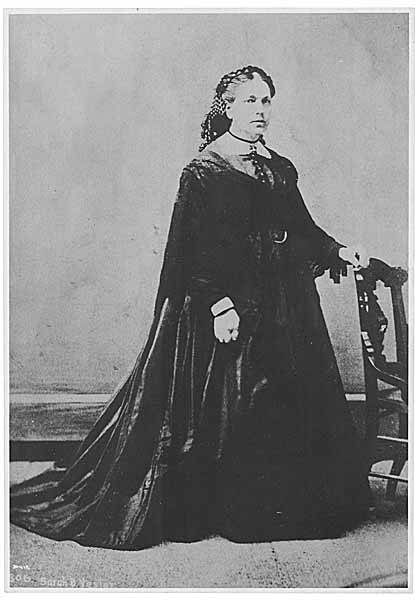
Sarah B. Yesler

In 1858, Yesler's wife Sarah joined him in Seattle, and the couple lived in a simple house across from the mill. Prior to her arrival, Yesler fathered a child named Julia with the fifteen-year-old Native daughter of a local Duwamish hereditary chief.

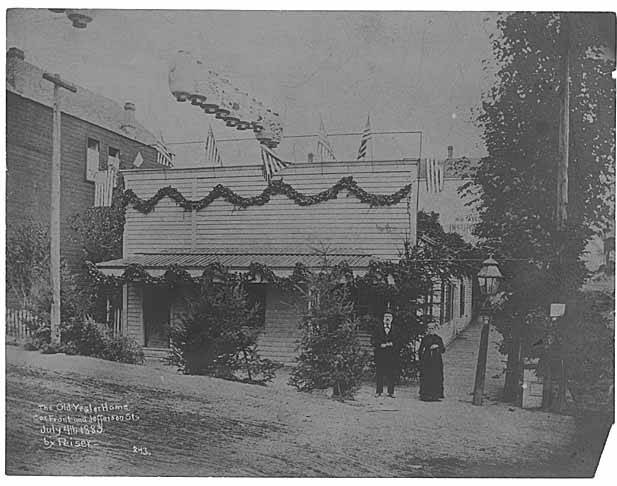
Henry and Sarah Yesler in front of their home at 1st Avenue and James Street on July 4, 1883

Yesler also served in public office, at various times as a county auditor, county commissioner, and mayor.

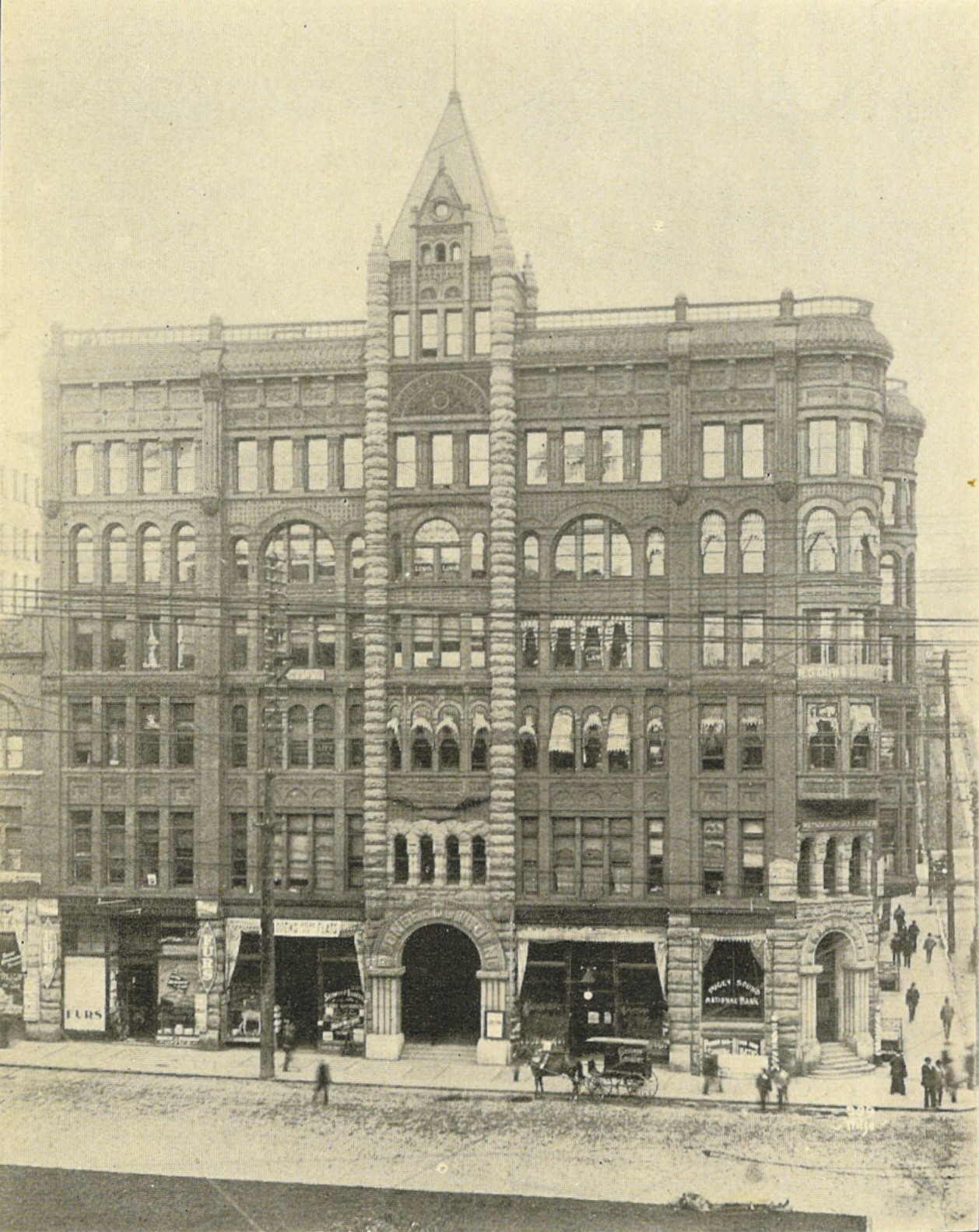
Yesler's post-fire Pioneer Building in 1900

On June 6, 1889, the Great Seattle Fire destroyed the entire business district (which consisted mainly of wooden buildings), including Yesler's sawmill, Yesler's Hall, a theater on the corner of and 1st Avenue, and Yesler's Pavilion, a civic center on 1st and Cherry Street. Yesler rebuilt on most of his properties, including 3 corners of Pioneer Square with substantial brick and stone buildings, including the Metropole Building (SW corner 3rd & Yesler), the Mutual Life Building (NW corner 1st & Yesler), and the Bank of Commerce Building (SW corner 1st & Yesler), all still standing though altered. In 1892, Yesler completed his grandest project the Pioneer Building on the same plot of land where his first home stood, now the heart of Seattle's Pioneer Square. Sarah Yesler had died in 1887, but Yesler built a large new mansion and shared his mansion with a younger female relative (some sources describe her as a maid), whom he married five months later.

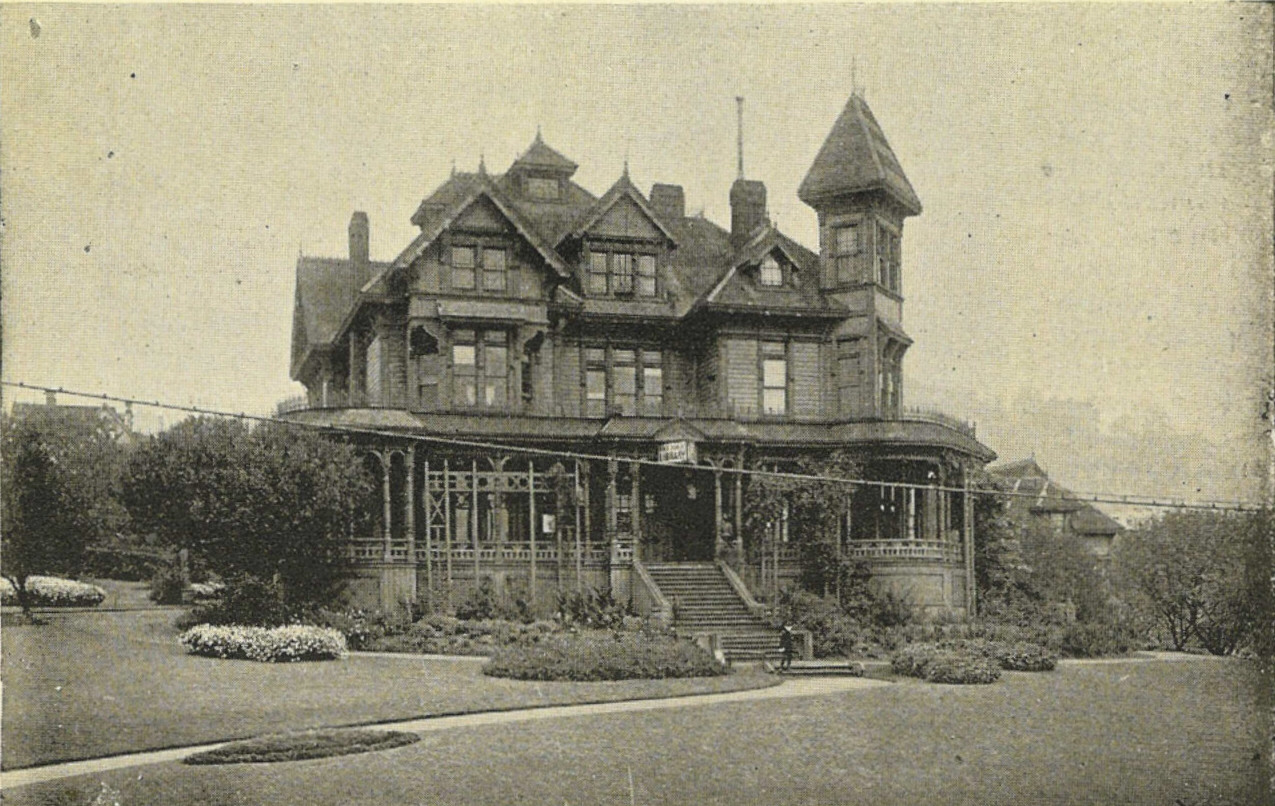
The Yesler mansion in 1900. It burned January 2, 1901 when it housed the Seattle Public Library

Yesler died on December 16, 1892, at the age of 82. He is buried in Seattle's Lake View Cemetery. After his death, Yesler's mansion became the first home of the Seattle Public Library, and burned down on January 2, 1901. The King County Courthouse currently occupies the site.

== Personality ==
In his informative and tongue-in-cheek book, Sons of the Profits, columnist and Seattle historian William C. Speidel pointed out some of Yesler's negative aspects. On numerous occasions, Yesler had lawsuits filed against him. On other occasions, it was Yesler himself doing the suing. "The City of Seattle made him a millionaire," wrote Speidel, "yet he sued it...fought it...plundered it...and on two occasions he brought it to the brink of bankruptcy." Speidel also recounts how, according to courthouse records, Yesler owed John McLain, an old friend from Ohio, $30,000 for the loan that the latter set up for construction of the mill. Yesler would pay him $12,000 of it over time, and it wasn't until McLain sued him that he was able to collect on the rest.

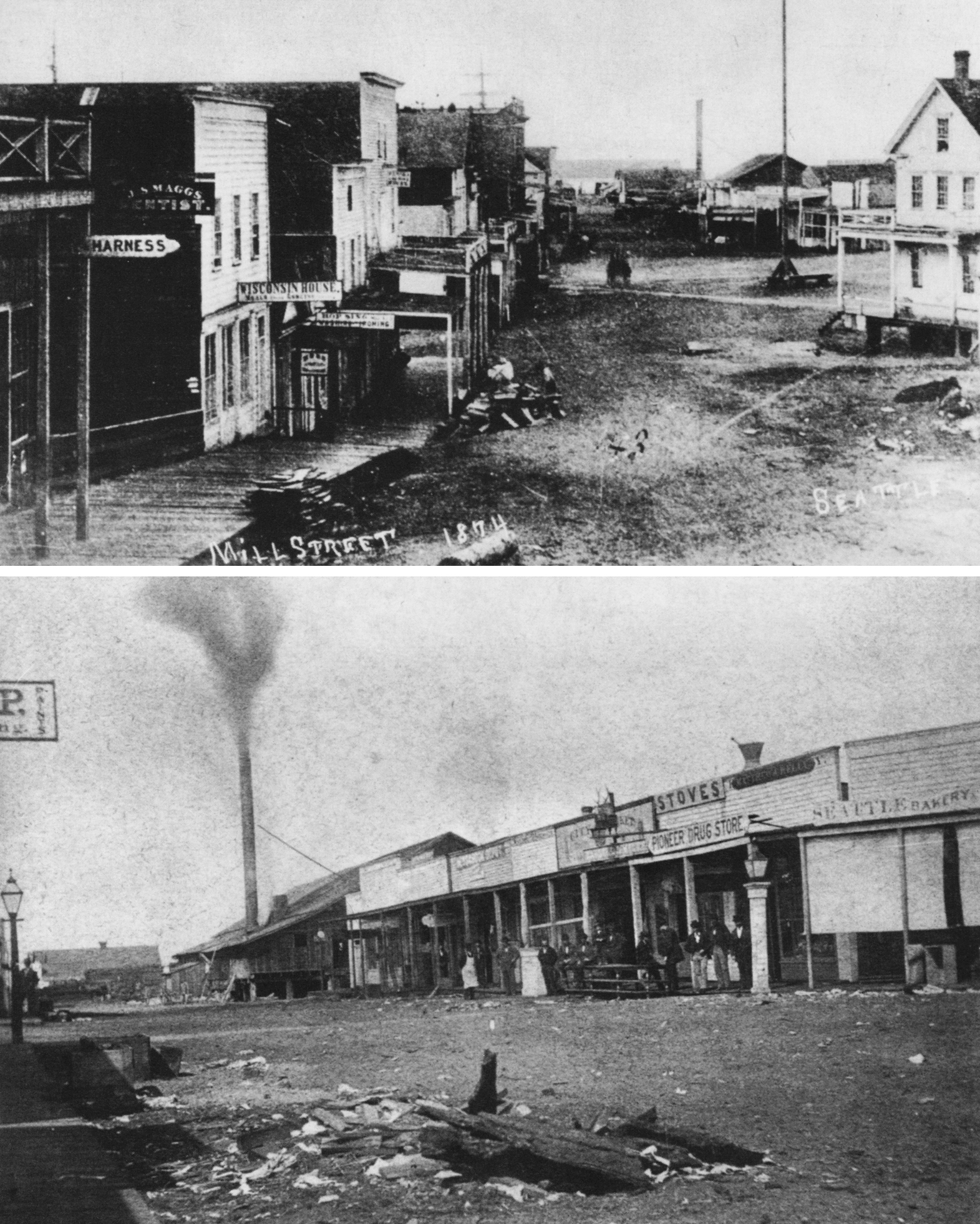
Two images of Yesler's Mill and nearby buildings, 1874

Yesler and his wife Sarah were Spiritualists and believed in free love. Some historians claim that Sarah and dressmaker Eliza Hurd were lovers, and thus some of the earliest settlers recorded in Seattle's LGBTQ history. Letters from Hurd to Sarah describe the two of them bathing and sleeping together.^{:7}

== Writings ==
- Yesler, Henry (1907). Daughter of old Chief Seattle. Coast Pub. Co.Available online through the Washington State Library's Classics in Washington History collection

Political offices
| Preceded by John Collins | Mayor of Seattle; 1874–1875 | Succeeded by Bailey Gatzert |
| Preceded by John Leary | Mayor of Seattle; 1885–1886 | Succeeded by William H. Shoudy |
