= 118th New York Infantry Regiment =

- Active: August 18–20, 1862 to June 13, 1865
- Country: United States
- Allegiance: Union
- Branch: Infantry
- Nickname(s): Adirondack Regiment
- Engagements: American Civil War: Siege of Suffolk; Battle of South Anna Bridge; Bermuda Hundred Campaign; Battle of Port Walthall Junction; Battle of Swift Creek; Battle of Proctor's Creek; Battle of Cold Harbor; Second Battle of Petersburg; Battle of the Crater; Battle of Chaffin's Farm; Fort Harrison; Battle of Fair Oaks & Darbytown Road

Commanders
- Notable commanders: Col. Samuel T. Richards; Col. Oliver Keese Jr. Col. George F. Nichols

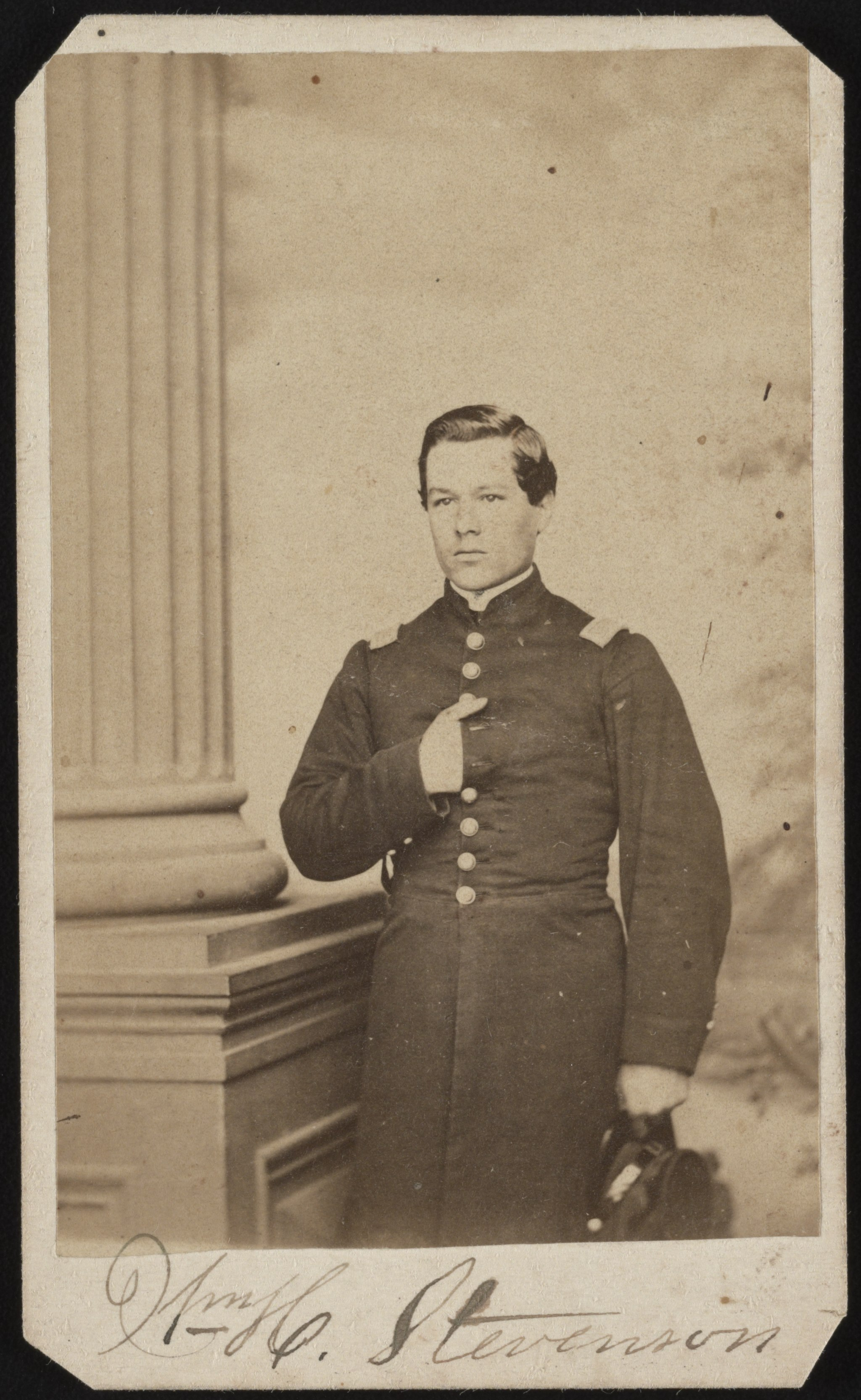
First Lieutenant William H. Stevenson of Co. F, 118th New York Infantry Regiment. From the Liljenquist Family Collection of Civil War Photographs, Prints and Photographs Division, Library of Congress

The 118th New York Infantry Regiment was recruited for service in the American Civil War (1861–1865) from Clinton, Essex, and Warren counties in Northern New York. Known as the Adirondack Regiment, the unit saw service along the Atlantic Coast in the Department of Virginia before transferring to the Army of the James in 1864. With the latter, they were engaged in the Overland Campaign and the subsequent siege of Petersburg.

== History ==
Col. Samuel T. Richards received authority on July 7, 1862, to organize an infantry regiment of men from Clinton, Essex, and Warren counties. The regiment was formed and mustered into federal service at Plattsburgh, New York, the following month and was appropriately dubbed the "Adirondack Regiment."

The regiment left New York on September 3, 1862, to take up their assignment of guard and provost duty in Washington, D.C., with the Provisional Brigade, Abercrombie's Division, Defenses of Washington. In February 1863, while continuing their duty in the federal capital, the regiment was assigned to the XXII Corps (ACW). The following April, the New Yorkers were sent to Suffolk, Virginia and attached to the Reserve Brigade, 3rd Division, VII Corps (ACW), under the command of Brig. Gen. George W. Getty, just in time to see action at the Siege of Suffolk. In May, the regiment moved to Portsmouth, Virginia, and spent much of the month in reconnaissance and skirmishing. During June and July 1863, the regiment participated in Dix's Peninsula Campaign and fought at the South Anna Bridge (July 4, 1863), suffering 11 casualties.

In early 1864, there were more skirmishes and maneuvers in eastern Virginia, but in April, following the dissolution of the 7th Corps, the regiment was assigned to the 2nd Brigade, 1st Division, XVIII Corps (ACW), Army of the James. The regiment participated in an engagement at Drury's Bluff and the ill-fated Bermuda Hundred Campaign in May. The regiment fought in the Battle of Swift Creek on May 9 and later that month, they were among those who moved to assist Grant at the Battle of Cold Harbor, where they suffered 32 casualties. The regiment fought on the right flank of the Union line at the Second Battle of Petersburg, losing 21 men. The final actions of 1864 for the 118th were the Battle of Chaffin's Farm and combat at Fort Harrison in September, followed by the Battle of Fair Oaks & Darbytown Road in October.

During the winter of 1864–65, the 118th NY manned the trenches outside Richmond and in December was reassigned to the 2nd Brigade, 3rd Division, XXIV Corps (ACW). In the Spring of 1865, the New Yorkers were the first organized Union unit to enter the abandoned Confederate capital. After serving provost duty in Richmond and Manchester, the 118th NY Volunteers were mustered out of service on June 13, 1865. Those men whose enlistment was not complete were reassigned to the 96th New York Volunteer Infantry.

== Casualties ==
- The regiment lost six officers and 93 enlisted men killed or mortally wounded, and 188 enlisted men died of disease or other causes. 12 officers and 226 enlisted men were wounded and recovered. Nine officers and 133 enlisted men were reported missing.

== Notable members ==
- M. W. Wilson, assistant surgeon

== See also ==
- List of New York Civil War units

== Sources ==
- Cunningham, John Lovell. Three Years with the Adirondack Regiment. Private Circulation, 1920.
- Phisterer, Frederick. New York in the War of the Rebellion, 1861 to 1865. Albany, NY: J. B. Lyon, 1912.
