= Battle of Darbytown Road =

Battle of the American Civil War

Coordinates: 37.4830°N 77.3574°W

- Part of the American Civil War
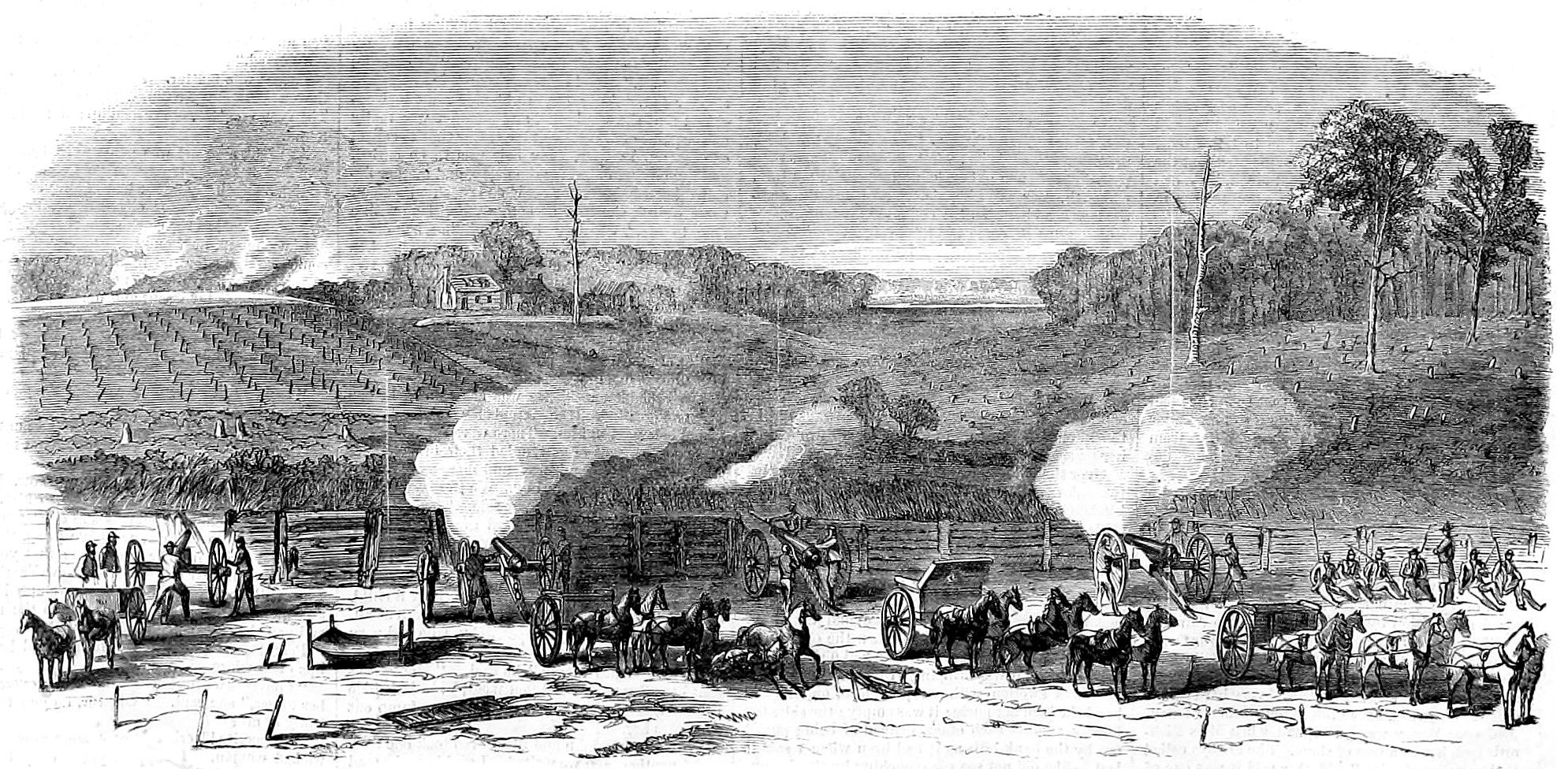
Date	October 13, 1864
Location	Henrico County, near Sandston, Virginia
Result	Inconclusive

Belligerents
United States (Union)	(Confederate States of America) CSA (Confederacy)

Commanders and leaders
Alfred Terry	Richard H. Anderson

Strength
X Corps	Corps

Casualties and losses
437 (36 killed, 358 wounded, 43 captured).	513 (Note: This estimate of Confederated casualties is obtained by subtracting the officially reported Union casualties (437) from the NPS estimate of total casualties (950).)

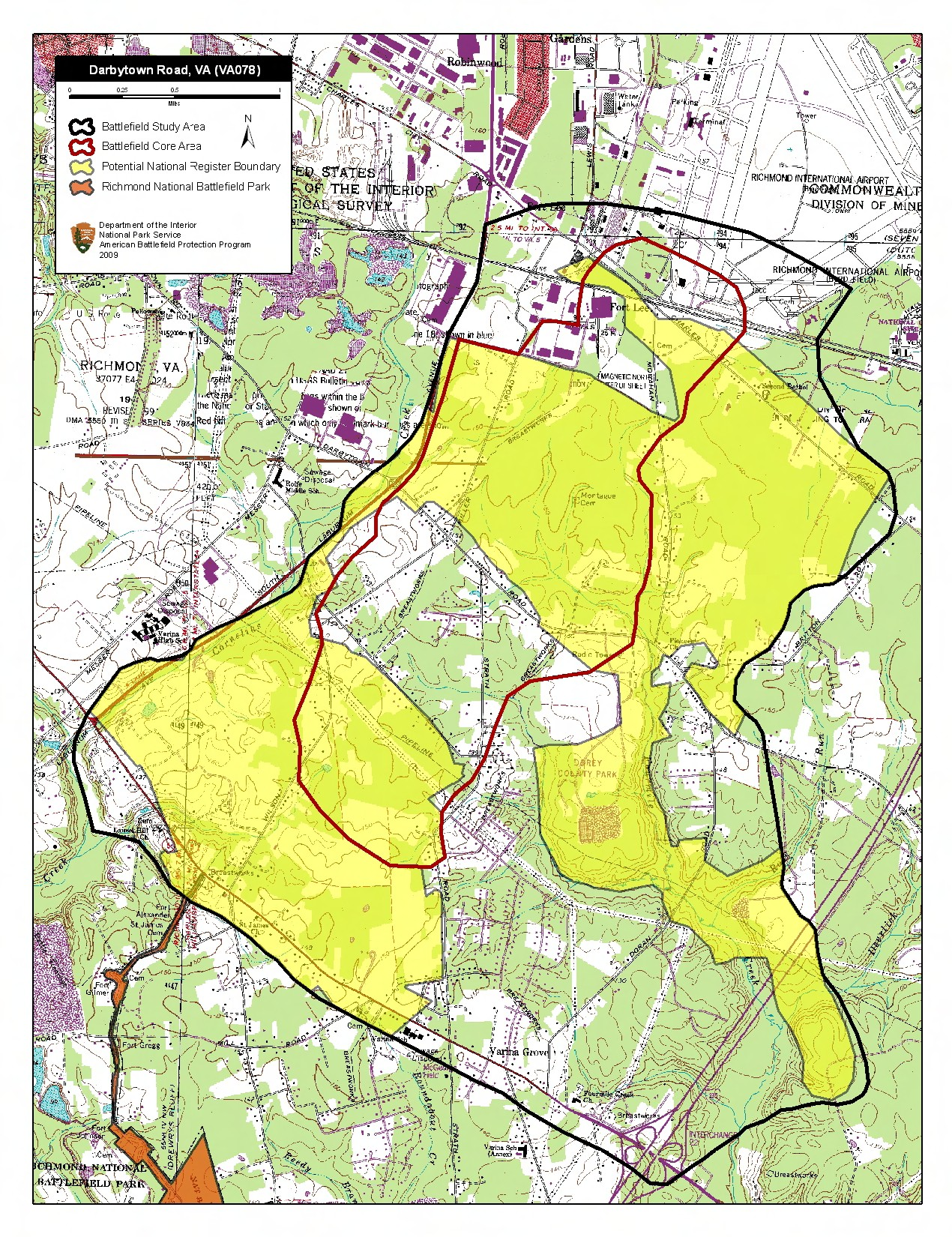
Map of Darbytown Road Battlefield core and study areas by the American Battlefield Protection Program.

The Battle of Darbytown Road was fought on October 13, 1864, between Union and Confederate forces. The Confederates were attempting to retake ground they had lost to Federal forces during battles near Richmond, Virginia. Their efforts failed. On October 13, Union forces advanced to find and feel the new Confederate defensive line in front of Richmond. While mostly a battle of skirmishers, a Federal brigade assaulted fortifications north of Darbytown Road and was repulsed with heavy casualties. The Federals retired to their entrenched lines along New Market Road.

== Opposing forces ==
=== Union ===
The Union order of battle is compiled from the official tabulation of casualties and includes only units which sustained casualties.

==== Military rank abbreviations used ====
- MG = Major General
- BG = Brigadier General
- Col = Colonel
- Ltc = Lieutenant Colonel
- Maj = Major
- Cpt = Captain

==== Other abbreviations ====
- w = wounded
- mw = mortally wounded
- k = killed
- c = captured

==== Army of the James ====
===== X Corps =====
MG Alfred H. Terry

Division	Brigade	Regiments and others
First Division; BG Adelbert Ames	1st Brigade Col Francis B. Pond	39th Illinois; 62nd Ohio; 67th Ohio; 85th Pennsylvania
First Division; BG Adelbert Ames	2nd Brigade BG Joseph R. Hawley	7th Connecticut; 3rd New Hampshire; 16th New York Heavy Artillery, 7 Companies
First Division; BG Adelbert Ames	3rd Brigade Col Harris M. Plaisted	10th Connecticut; 11th Maine; 24th Massachusetts
Second Division [not engaged]		
Third Division; BG William Birney	1st Brigade Col Alvin C. Voris	7th U.S. Colored Troops; 9th U.S. Colored Troops
Third Division; BG William Birney	2nd Brigade Col Ulysses Doubleday	29th Connecticut; 8th U.S. Colored Troops; 45th U.S. Colored Troops
Cavalry Division; BG August V. Kautz	1st Brigade Col Robert M. West	5th Pennsylvania
Cavalry Division; BG August V. Kautz	2nd Brigade Col Samuel P. Spear	11th Pennsylvania
Cavalry Division; BG August V. Kautz	3rd Brigade Col Andrew W. Evans	1st Maryland; 1st New York Mounted Rifles
