= Alfred Guibord =

American politician

Alfred Guibord (November 30, 1841 – October 17, 1908) was an American banker and politician from New York.

== Life ==
Guibord was born on November 30, 1841, in Plattsburgh, New York, the son of Canadian immigrant Louis Guibord and Eleanor Menard DeBellerose.

Guiboard briefly attended the Plattsburgh Academy. From 1855 to 1866, he worked as a clerk in the store Hartwell & Winslow. From 1867 to 1884, he was cashier of the First National Bank of Plattsburgh. In 1884, he helped organize the Merchants National Bank of Plattsburgh, serving as its first president until his death. The bank was one of the leading banking institutions in Northern New York. He was elected village president of Plattsburgh in 1895, and was re-elected to that office in 1896 and 1896. He was an incorporator of the Chaplain Valley Hospital and served as its first treasurer of the board of trustees until his death. He was appointed to the Board of Managers of the State Normal School and served as president and treasurer of the board.

Guibord was a Commissioner of the New York and Canada Railroad. He was County Treasurer from 1878 to 1884. In 1889, he was elected to the New York State Assembly as a Republican, representing Clinton County. He served in the Assembly in 1890 and 1891.

Guibord was a member of the Freemasons and president of the local YMCA. He was a trustee and treasurer of the Methodist Episcopal Church. In 1868, he married Sarah Haile Weaver of Ganges, Michigan. Their children were Robert Henderson, Alfred Willis, John Wever, and Philip Arthur.

Guibord died at home on October 17, 1908. He was buried in Riverside Cemetery.

New York State Assembly
Preceded by Stephen Moffitt	New York State Assembly; Clinton County; 1890–1891	Succeeded by Edward Hall
