= 16th New York Heavy Artillery Regiment =

16th New York Heavy Artillery Regiment, U.S. Volunteers
- Active: September 1863 to August 21, 1865
- Country: United States
- Allegiance: Union
- Branch: Artillery/Infantry
- Engagements: Siege of Petersburg; Dutch Gap; Battle of Chaffin's Farm; Battle of Darbytown and New Market Roads; Battle of Darbytown Road; Battle of Fair Oaks & Darbytown Road; Second Battle of Fort Fisher; Battle of Wilmington

Insignia
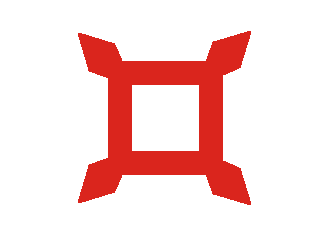
- 1st Division, X Corps

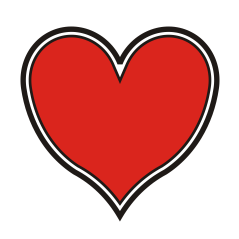
- 1st Division, XXIV Corps

The 16th New York Heavy Artillery Regiment, U.S. Volunteers was an artillery regiment of the Union Army during the American Civil War, but served mostly as infantry.

== Service ==
Companies organized and mustered in between September 1863 and February 1864. All moved to Fortress Monroe, Virginia. Regiment on duty at Fortress Monroe, Yorktown and Gloucester Point, Virginia, till June 1864, as Heavy Artillery and Infantry. Companies were attached to various brigades/divisions of X Corps, Army of the James, through December 1864 and then XXII Corps and XXIV Corps, to July–August 1865.

The surplus men recruited were ordered transferred to the 6th New York Heavy Artillery Regiment in April 1864, and in May 1864, a large number of men were transferred to the 81st New York Volunteer Infantry and 148th New York Volunteer Infantry Regiment and 270 to the 1st Regiment New York Mounted Rifles.

Regiment concentrated at Washington, District of Columbia, July 1865, and duty there till August. Mustered out August 21, 1865.

== Total strength and casualties ==
According to one source in June 1864, the regiment was "the largest regiment ever recruited in the United States, and has men in the following places: At Yorktown, 1,140; at Williamsburgh, 736; at Gloucester Point, 147; at Bermuda Hundred, 270; putting up telegraph, 60; with One Hundred and Forty-eighth New York Volunteers, 46; with First New York Mounted Rifles, 272—transferred; with Eighty-fifth New York Volunteers, 46; with light batteries United States Artillery, 22; with Army of the Potomac, 201—transferred; making a total of 2,928 men and 63 officers." This source claimed there were nearly 3,700 men mustered for the regiment.

Regiment lost during service 42 Enlisted men killed and mortally wounded and 2 Officers and 284 Enlisted men by disease. Total 328.

== Commanders ==
- Colonel Joseph J. Morrison

== See also ==
- List of New York Civil War regiments
