= 1860 New England Shoemakers Strike =

The New England Shoemakers Strike of 1860 or Lynn Shoeworkers Strike began on February 22, 1860 with 3,000 shoemakers walking off their jobs in Lynn, Massachusetts. It ended in April with modest gains for shoemakers, including pay increases and owner recognition of some labor unions. Approximately 20,000 workers went on strike across New England which made it the largest mass walkout in American history prior to the Civil War.

== Background ==
The Panic of 1857 resulted in the temporary loss of jobs for many shoemakers. Workers were also angry at the increasing mechanization of the shoemaking process. When companies began hiring again, the cost of shoes went up and wages declined significantly. Hours were long (16 hours of work per day) and wages were low; men were earning only $3 a week and women just $1. In early 1860, the Mechanics Association was formed and it demanded higher wages. The company owners refused to meet with committees of the association and workers decided to strike.

== Strike ==
The beginning date of the strike was intentionally chosen to coincide with the birthday of former U.S. President George Washington. Within a week, the strike had spread to 25 other New England towns, including towns in Maine, Massachusetts, New Hampshire and even New York. 20,000 more shoemakers refused to work while 20,000 others openly supported the shoemakers with marches, parades and opposition to the police. Women played a crucial role in the strike, including the leading of a 6,000 person process through a late winter blizzard in Lynn on March 8 with signs reading "American Ladies Will Not Be Slaves: Give Us a Fair Compensation and We Will Labour Cheerfully". The strike occurred during the 1860 presidential election and Republican candidate Abraham Lincoln voiced his support for the workers, saying "I am glad to see that a system of labor prevails in New England Under which laborers can strike when they want to, where they are not obliged to labor whether you pay them or not. I like a system which lets a man quit when he wants to, and wish it might prevail everywhere." At the time, it was one of the largest workers' protest in United States history, and the biggest strike in the United States up until then.

The strike, which had widespread community support, mostly ended on April 10 when 30 employers signed agreements to raise wages. The strike is considered a partial win for workers, as their newly recognized unions were recognized and most workmen received wage increases. A key leader of the strike was Alonzo G. Draper, who later became a Civil War General in the Union Army and died in 1865.

== Bibliography ==
- Dawley, Alan; Class and Community: The Industrial Revolution in Lynn; Harvard University Press, 1976
- Faler, Paul G.; Mechanics and manufacturers in the early industrial revolution : Lynn, Massachusetts, 1780-1860; Albany : State University of New York Press, 1981
