= 137th Pennsylvania Infantry Regiment =

Union Army infantry regiment

137th Pennsylvania Volunteer Infantry
- Active: August 25, 1862 to June 1, 1863
- Country: United States
- Allegiance: Union
- Branch: Infantry
- Engagements: Battle of South Mountain; Battle of Antietam; Battle of Fredericksburg; Battle of Chancellorsville

The 137th Pennsylvania Volunteer Infantry was an infantry regiment that served in the Union Army during the American Civil War.

== Service ==
The 137th Pennsylvania Infantry was organized at Harrisburg, Pennsylvania, and mustered in for a nine-month enlistment on August 25, 1862 under the command of Colonel Henry M. Bossert.

The regiment was attached to 1st Brigade, 2nd Division, VI Corps, Army of the Potomac, to December 1862. Provisional Brigade, Aquia Creek, Virginia, Patrick's Command, Army of the Potomac, to January 1863. 3rd Brigade, 1st Division, I Corps, Army of the Potomac, to May 1863.

The 137th Pennsylvania Infantry mustered out of service on June 1, 1863.

== Detailed service ==
Ordered to Washington, D.C. immediately upon organization. Maryland Campaign September 1862. Sugar Loaf Mountain September 10–11. Crampton's Gap September 14. Antietam September 17. Duty in Maryland to November. In the defenses of Washington, D.C. until December, and at Aquia Creek, Va., until January 1863. Burnside's 2nd Campaign, "Mud March," January 20–24, 1863. Duty at Belle Plains until April. Chancellorsville Campaign April 27-May 6. Operations at Pollock's Mill Creek April 29-May 2. Chancellorsville May 2–5. Ordered to Harrisburg, Pa. for muster out.

== Casualties ==
The regiment lost a total of 59 men during service; 1 officer and 58 enlisted men died of disease.

== Commanders ==
- Colonel Henry M. Bossert - resigned March 14, 1863
- Colonel Joseph Barr Kiddoo

== See also ==
- List of Pennsylvania Civil War Units
- Pennsylvania in the Civil War
