= Battle of Chaffin's Farm order of battle: Confederate =

The following Confederate States Army units and commanders fought in the Battle of Chaffin's Farm of the American Civil War. The Union order of battle is shown separately.

== Abbreviations used ==
=== Military rank ===
- Gen = General
- LTG = Lieutenant General
- MG = Major General
- BG = Brigadier General
- Col = Colonel
- Ltc = Lieutenant Colonel
- Maj = Major
- Cpt = Captain
- Lt = Lieutenant

=== Other ===
- (w) = wounded
- (mw) = mortally wounded
- (k) = killed in action
- (c) = captured

== Army of Northern Virginia ==
Gen Robert E. Lee

=== First Corps ===
LTG Richard H. Anderson

Division	Brigade	Regiments and Others
Field's Division; MG Charles W. Field	Gregg's Texas Brigade BG John Gregg	3rd Arkansas Infantry; 1st Texas Infantry - Col Frederick S. Bass; 4th Texas Infantry; 5th Texas Infantry
Field's Division; MG Charles W. Field	Benning's Brigade Col Dudley M. Du Bose	2nd Georgia Infantry; 15th Georgia Infantry; 17th Georgia Infantry: Maj. James Moore; 20th Georgia Infantry
Field's Division; MG Charles W. Field	Anderson's Brigade BG George T. Anderson	7th Georgia Infantry; 8th Georgia Infantry; 9th Georgia Infantry; 11th Georgia Infantry; 59th Georgia Infantry
Field's Division; MG Charles W. Field	Law's Brigade Col Pinckney D. Bowles	4th Alabama Infantry; 15th Alabama Infantry; 44th Alabama Infantry; 47th Alabama Infantry; 48th Alabama Infantry
Field's Division; MG Charles W. Field	Bratton's Brigade BG John Bratton	1st South Carolina Infantry; 2nd South Carolina Rifles; 5th South Carolina Infantry; 6th South Carolina Infantry; Palmetto Sharpshooters
Artillery	1st Virginia Light Artillery Battalion Ltc Robert Archelaus Hardaway	3rd Richmond Howitzers (Virginia); 1st Rockbridge Artillery (Virginia); Powhatan Artillery (Virginia); Salem Flying Artillery (Virginia)

=== Department of North Carolina & Southern Virginia ===
Gen P. G. T. Beauregard

Division	Brigade	Regiments and Others
Hoke's Division; MG Robert F. Hoke	Clingman's Brigade Col Hector M. McKethan	8th North Carolina Infantry; 31st North Carolina Infantry; 51st North Carolina Infantry; 61st North Carolina Infantry
Hoke's Division; MG Robert F. Hoke	Collquitt's Brigade BG Alfred H. Colquitt	6th Georgia Infantry; 19th Georgia Infantry; 23rd Georgia Infantry; 27th Georgia Infantry; 28th Georgia Infantry
Hoke's Division; MG Robert F. Hoke	Hagood's Brigade BG Johnson Hagood	11th South Carolina Infantry; 21st South Carolina Infantry; 25th South Carolina Infantry; 27th South Carolina Infantry; 7th South Carolina Infantry Battalion
Hoke's Division; MG Robert F. Hoke	Martin's Brigade BG William W. Kirkland	17th North Carolina Infantry; 42nd North Carolina Infantry; 50th North Carolina Infantry

== Department of Richmond ==
LTG Richard S. Ewell

Division	Brigade	Regiments and Others
Defenses of Richmond	Johnson's Brigade Col John M. Hughs	17th Tennessee Infantry; 23rd Tennessee Infantry; 25th Tennessee Infantry; 44th Tennessee Infantry; 63rd Tennessee Infantry; 1st Virginia Reserve Battalion - Maj James Strange; 2nd Virginia Reserve Battalion - Ltc John H. Guy; 25th Virginia Battalion - Maj Wyatt Elliott
Defenses of Richmond	Gary's Brigade BG Martin W. Gary	Hampton's Legion; 7th South Carolina Cavalry; 24th Virginia Cavalry

=== Reserve Forces of Virginia ===
MG James L. Kemper

Division	Brigade	Regiments and Others
Barton's Division; MG Seth M. Barton	Local Defense BG Patrick T. Moore	1st Virginia LDF Battalion; 2nd Virginia LDF; 3rd Virginia LDF; 4th Virginia LDF Battalion; 5th Virginia LDF Battalion; VMI Cadet Company Battalion; Richmond Ambulance Company; Detail Maryland Line
Barton's Division; MG Seth M. Barton	Barton's City Brigade Col Meriwether Lewis Clark, Sr.	1st City Regiment; 2nd City Regiment; 3rd City Regiment; 4th City Regiment; Castle Thunder Company
Barton's Division; MG Seth M. Barton	Independent Richmond Infantry	1st Virginia Militia; 3rd Virginia Reserve Battalion; 19th Virginia Militia; Provost Guard
Barton's Division; MG Seth M. Barton	Independent Richmond Cavalry	1st Virginia LDF Cavalry Battalion; Owen's City Cavalry Regiment
Artillery Defense; Ltc John C. Pemberton	First Division Ltc John W. Atkinson	10th Virginia Heavy Artillery Battalion; 19th Virginia Heavy Artillery Battalion
Artillery Defense; Ltc John C. Pemberton	Second Division Ltc James M. Howard	18th Virginia Heavy Artillery Battalion; 20th Virginia Heavy Artillery Battalion
Artillery Defense; Ltc John C. Pemberton	Lightfoot's Battalion Ltc Charles E. Lightfoot	Caroline Artillery; Second Nelson Artillery; Surry Light Artillery
Artillery Defense; Ltc John C. Pemberton	Stark's Battalion Maj Alexander W. Stark	Louisiana Guard Artillery; Mathews Artillery; McComas Artillery
Artillery Defense; Ltc John C. Pemberton	Chaffin's Bluff Battalion Ltc John Minor Maury	Goochland Artillery; Norfolk Howitzers; James City Artillery; Pamunkey Artillery; Lunenburg Artillery
