= 22nd United States Colored Infantry Regiment =

Union Army infantry regiment

22nd United States Colored Infantry
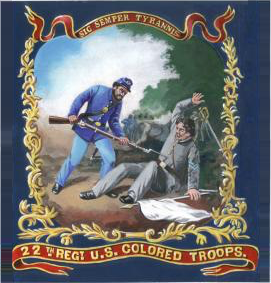
- Active: January 10, 1864 - October 16, 1865
- Country: United States
- Allegiance: Union
- Branch: Infantry
- Engagements: Siege of Petersburg; Second Battle of Deep Bottom; Battle of Chaffin's Farm; Battle of Fair Oaks & Darbytown Road

The 22nd United States Colored Infantry was an infantry regiment that served in the Union Army during the American Civil War. The regiment was composed of African American enlisted men commanded by white officers and was authorized by the Bureau of Colored Troops, which was created by the United States War Department on May 22, 1863.

== Service ==
The 22nd U.S. Colored Infantry was organized at Camp William Penn near Philadelphia, Pennsylvania beginning January 10, 1864 for three-year service and mustered under the command of Colonel Joseph Barr Kiddoo. Over 600 men in the regiment were from New Jersey.

The regiment was attached to U.S. Forces, Yorktown, Virginia, Department of Virginia and North Carolina, to April 1864. 1st Brigade, Hincks' Division (Colored), XVIII Corps, Army of the James, to June 1864. 1st Brigade, 3rd Division, XVIII Corps, June 1864. 2nd Brigade, 3rd Division, XVIII Corps, to August 1864. 1st Brigade, 3rd Division, XVIII Corps, August 1864. 1st Brigade, 3rd Division, X Corps, to September 1864. 1st Brigade, 3rd Division, XVIII Corps, to December 1864. 1st Brigade, 3rd Division, XXV Corps, December 1864. 1st Brigade, 1st Division, XXV Corps, and Department of Texas, to October 1865.

The 22nd U.S. Colored Infantry mustered out of service on October 16, 1865.

== Detailed service ==
The infantry was ordered to Yorktown, VA in January 1864 for duty nearby until May 1864. The order initially had 681 men. The expedition continued as follows: an expedition to King and Queen County March 9–12; Butler's operations south of the James River and against Petersburg and Richmond May 4-June 15; duty at Wilson's Wharf, James River protecting supply transports, then constructing works near Fort Powhatan until June; the attack on Fort Powhatan May 21; before Petersburg June 15–18; siege operations against Petersburg and Richmond June 16, 1864, to April 2, 1865; Deep Bottom August 24; Dutch Gap August 24; demonstration north of the James River September 28–30; Battle of Chaffin's Farm, New Market Heights, September 29–30; Fort Harrison September 29; Battle of Fair Oaks October 27–28; Chaffin's Farm November 4; in the trenches before Richmond until April 1865; occupation of Richmond April 3; moved to Washington, D.C., and participated in the obsequies of President Lincoln, and afterward to the eastern shore of Maryland and along lower Potomac in pursuit of the assassins. They then rejoined the corps May 1865 and moved to Texas May 24-June 6 for duty along the Rio Grande until October 1865.

== Casualties ==
The regiment lost a total of 217 men during service; 2 officers and 70 enlisted men killed or mortally wounded, 1 officer and 144 enlisted men died of disease.

== Commanders ==
- Colonel Joseph Barr Kiddoo

== See also ==
- List of United States Colored Troops Civil War Units
- United States Colored Troops
