= Henry E. Barnard =

American lawyer and politician (1837–1919)

Henry Eells Barnard (March 2, 1837 – August 3, 1919) was an American lawyer and politician from New York.

== Life ==
Barnard was born on March 2, 1837, in Plattsburgh, New York, the son of Charles Barnard and Sarah Eells.

Barnard attended Plattsburgh Academy. He graduated from the University of Vermont in 1859. He read law in the office of Palmer & Armstrong, and then studied at Albany Law School, graduating from there in 1861. He initially practiced law in Iowa, first in Des Moines then in Boonesboro. In 1862, he became principal of the Iowa City public schools. He later returned to Plattsburgh and developed a law practice there.

In 1864, Barnard was appointed and later elected town clerk of Plattsburgh. In 1865, he was appointed town assessor. In 1866, he was appointed justice of the peace to fill the vacancy caused by the death of his father, who previously served the position. In 1867, he was elected president of the village of Plattsburgh. In 1868, he was elected village trustee. In 1871, he was elected District Attorney of Clinton County, and was re-elected to the position in 1898. He was also elected a member of the board of education and served on the board for 30 years.

In 1892, Barnard was elected to the New York State Assembly as a Democrat, representing Clinton County. He served in the Assembly in 1893.

Barnard was a member of the Freemasons, the Royal Arch Masons, the Knights Templar, and the Mystic Shrine. In 1869, he married Marianna Moore of Rouse's Point. They had two children, Charles and Harry. Harry drowned in the Saranac River on Christmas 1888, when he was 10. Charles served as mayor of Plattsburgh.

Barnard, suffering from declining health for some time, hanged himself on August 3, 1919. He was buried in Riverside Cemetery.

New York State Assembly
| Preceded by Edward Hall | New York State Assembly; Clinton County; 1893 | Succeeded by Everett C. Baker |
