= 36th United States Colored Infantry Regiment =

36th United States Colored Infantry
- Active: February 8, 1864 - October 28, 1866
- Country: United States
- Allegiance: Union
- Branch: Infantry
- Engagements: Siege of Petersburg; Battle of Chaffin's Farm; Battle of Fair Oaks & Darbytown Road; Appomattox Campaign

The 36th United States Colored Infantry was an infantry regiment that served in the Union Army during the American Civil War. The regiment was composed of African American enlisted men commanded by white officers and was authorized by the Bureau of Colored Troops which was created by the United States War Department on May 22, 1863.

== Service ==
The 2nd North Carolina Colored Infantry was re-designated the 36th U.S. Colored Infantry by the U.S. Department of War on February 8, 1864. It was organized for three-year service under the command of Colonel Alonzo G. Draper.

The regiment was attached to U.S. Forces, Norfolk and Portsmouth, Department of Virginia and North Carolina, to April 1864. District of St. Marys, Department of Virginia and North Carolina, to June 1864. Unattached, Army of the James, to August 1864. 2nd Brigade, 3rd Division, XVIII Corps, to December 1864. 1st Brigade, 3rd Division, XXV Corps, December 1864. 1st Brigade, 1st Division, XXV Corps, and Department of Texas, to October 1866.

The 36th U.S. Colored Infantry mustered out of service October 28, 1866.

== Detailed service ==
Duty at Norfolk and Portsmouth, Va., until April 1864. At Point Lookout, Md., District of St. Marys, guarding prisoners until July 1864. Expedition from Point Lookout to Westmoreland County April 12–14. Expedition from Point Lookout to the Rappahannock River May 11–14, and to Pope's Creek June 11–21. Moved from Point Lookout to Bermuda Hundred, Va., July 1–3. Siege operations against Petersburg and Richmond, Va., July 3, 1864 to April 2, 1865. Battle of Chaffin's Farm, New Market Heights, September 29–30. Battle of Fair Oaks October 27–28. Dutch Gap November 17. Indiantown, Sandy Creek, N.C., December 18 (detachment). Duty north of the James River before Richmond until March 27, 1865. Appomattox Campaign March 27-April 9. Occupation of Richmond April 3. Duty in the Department of Virginia until May. Moved to Texas May 24-June 6. Duty along the Rio Grande, Texas, and at various points in Texas until October 1866.

== Casualties ==
The regiment lost a total of 224 men during service; 8 officers and 79 enlisted men killed or mortally wounded, 5 officers and 132 enlisted men died of disease.

== Commanders ==
- Colonel Alonzo G. Draper
- Lieutenant Colonel Benjamin F. Pratt

== Notable members ==
- Private James Daniel Gardner, Company I - Medal of Honor recipient for action at the Battle of Chaffin's Farm
- Corporal Miles James, Company B - Medal of Honor recipient for action at the Battle of Chaffin's Farm

== See also ==
- List of United States Colored Troops Civil War Units
- United States Colored Troops

== Sources ==
- Bryant, James K. The 36th Infantry United States Colored Troops in the Civil War: A History and Roster (Jefferson, NC: McFarland & Co.), 2012. ISBN 0-7864-6878-5
- Dyer, Frederick H. A Compendium of the War of the Rebellion (Des Moines, IA: Dyer Pub. Co.), 1908.
- Reid, Richard M. (2008). Freedom for Themselves: North Carolina's Black Soldiers in the Civil War Era. Chapel Hill, North Carolina: University of North Carolina Press. ISBN 0-8078-3174-3.

Attribution
