= Alonzo G. Draper =

American volunteer officer

Alonzo Granville Draper
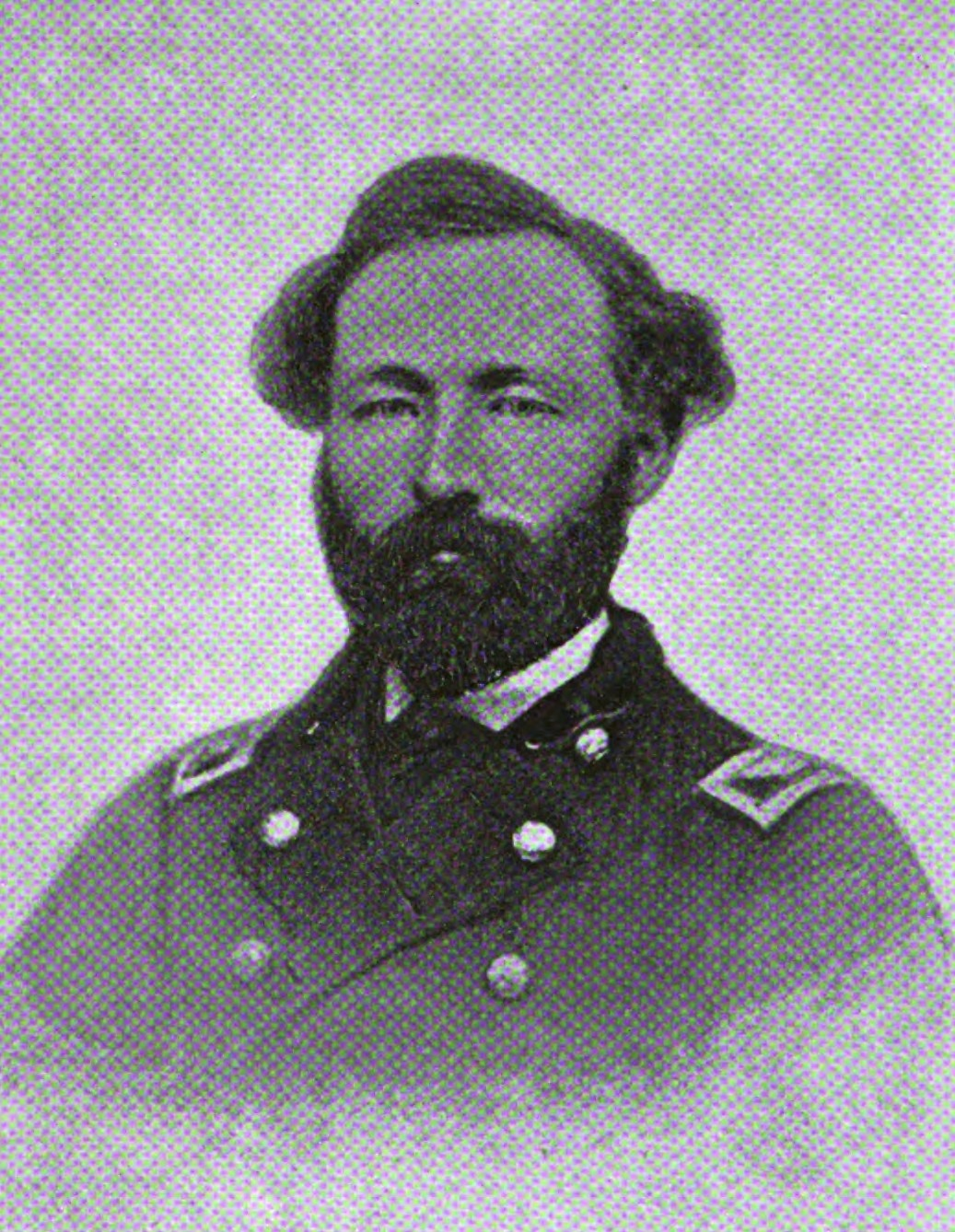
- Born: September 6, 1835; Brattleboro, Vermont
- Died: September 3, 1865 (aged 29); Brazos Santiago, Texas
- Burial place: Pine Grove Cemetery, Lynn, Massachusetts
- Military career
- Allegiance: United States; Union
- Branch: United States Army; Union Army
- Service years: 1861–1865
- Rank: Brevet Brigadier General
- Commands: Company C, 1st Regiment Massachusetts Volunteer Heavy Artillery; 2nd North Carolina Colored Volunteers (U.S.) later known as the 36th United States Colored Troops; Second Brigade, Third Division of the XVIII Corps; First Brigade, First Division of the XXV Corps
- Conflicts: American Civil War
- Awards: Brevet Brigadier General

Alonzo Granville Draper (September 6, 1835 – September 3, 1865) was a volunteer officer in the Union Army during the American Civil War who eventually earned the grade of brevet brigadier general. During his early career, Draper was an outspoken advocate of various social causes, particularly worker's rights. As an officer during the Civil War, Draper was best known as the commander of the 36th United States Colored Troops.

== Early career ==
Born in Brattleboro, Vermont, Draper eventually moved to Lynn, Massachusetts. He was known as an eloquent speaker and became a local leader of several social causes including temperance and labor rights. In 1859, Draper was elected the first chairman of the Lynn Mechanics Association. In connection with this position, he also became editor of the New England Mechanic, a publication dealing with the rights of industrial laborers. Draper was one of the key leaders of the New England Shoemakers Strike of 1860, the first significant movement of its kind. The political popularity he earned as a champion of worker's rights helped him to become assistant city marshal in Lynn.

A few years before the Civil War, Draper married Sarah Elizabeth Andrews of Boston. They would have six children including one set of twins.

== Civil War service ==
Shortly after the beginning of the Civil War, Draper began recruiting a company of volunteer soldiers in Lynn. Draper was commissioned captain on July 5, 1861, and his company became Company C of the 14th Regiment Massachusetts Volunteer Infantry. The regiment trained at Fort Warren in Boston and departed for Washington, D.C., in August 1861. Soon after arriving in Washington, the 14th Massachusetts was assigned to garrison duty at Fort Albany in Arlington, Virginia, which was one of many fortifications defending the capital. The regiment spent months training in the use of heavy artillery and therefore, in January 1862, was re-organized and became the 1st Regiment Massachusetts Volunteer Heavy Artillery. On January 16, 1863, he was promoted to the grade of major.

In the summer of 1863, Brig. Gen. Edward A. Wild, also from Massachusetts, organized the creation of several units of North Carolina infantry regiments consisting of African-American volunteers who would fight for the Union. Draper desired to lead one of these regiments and sought the support of Governor John Albion Andrew of Massachusetts. Writing Gov. Andrew, Draper described his passion for abolitionism and his desire to support the rights of African-Americans. On August 2, 1863, he became colonel of the 2nd North Carolina Colored Volunteers. According to historian Richard Reid, Draper lived up to his promises, working to enlist freed slaves in his own and other African-American units, defending the men in his regiment in the face of racism on the part of other soldiers and officers, and implementing programs to educate former slaves in his unit. At the same time, Draper was also a harsh disciplinarian, dealing strictly with the men under his command.

During their service in Virginia and North Carolina in 1863, the 2nd North Carolina was mainly assigned to expeditions in rural areas aimed at capturing and dispersing Confederate guerrillas and recruiting additional African-American soldiers from the large numbers of freed slaves. Draper led one such expedition in November 1863, commanding two regiments of African-American troops through Princess Anne County, Virginia (now Virginia Beach). The expedition was highly successful and Draper earned praise from his superiors. The expeditions also brought controversy due to alleged harsh treatment of Confederate sympathizers, their families and their property. Draper was under orders from his superior officer, Wild, to execute guerrillas and arrest civilians lending aid to guerrillas. In December 1863, Draper was involved in a dispute with Lieutenant Colonel Frederick F. Wead, commander of the 98th New York Infantry and a garrison post at Pungo, Virginia. After a raid nearby Pungo, at Knotts Island, North Carolina, Draper took a female civilian hostage in retribution for the capture of several of his soldiers. Wead objected to this and brought charges against Draper. Major General Benjamin Butler intervened in Draper's favor and had Wead transferred to New York.

Draper also received a transfer as a result of the controversy. In March 1864, Draper and his regiment (which had, in February 1864 been renamed the 36th United States Colored Troops) were transferred to garrison duty at Point Lookout, Maryland, a Union prisoner of war camp. Draper there served as commandant for three months until June 1864. Through the support of his mentor, Butler, Draper eventually secured a transfer away from this undesirable post and in the spring of 1864 the 36th USCT was assigned to combat duty with the Army of the James as part of the XVIII Corps. In 1864 and 1865, the 36th USCT took part in the ending phase of the Siege of Petersburg and the Appomattox Campaign. For much of this time, Draper commanded the brigade, consisting of three regiments of African-American troops, to which the 36th USCT belonged.

During the Battle of Fair Oaks & Darbytown Road on October 28, 1864, near Richmond, Draper was commended for gallant service. He later received the honorary grade of brevet brigadier general, dating from October 28 in recognition of his leadership at Fair Oaks.

In February 1865, Draper was again involved in a controversy with fellow officers. This time, Draper brought charges against Wild who was, by that time, a division commander. Draper charged Wild with "conduct prejudicial to good order and military discipline." Wild, according to Draper, had slandered Draper's reputation by insinuating that he was malicious and biased in his behavior towards other officers. As a result of the charges, Wild was relieved of command of his division and demoted to command of a brigade.

== Post-war ==
After the war, Draper remained in army and was mortally wounded on August 30, 1865, in Brazos Santiago, Texas, by an accidental gunshot wound by soldiers in target practice. He died on September 3, 1865. Draper was buried in Pine Grove Cemetery in Lynn, Massachusetts.

== In media ==
Draper is portrayed in Black Cloud Rising, 2022 historic fiction by David Wright Faladé. Draper is the commanding officer of the protagonist and narrator, Richard Etheridge, who was among the first enlistees in the African Brigade, later known as 36th U.S. Colored Troops. The plot follows them from March 1863 to the time of Draper’s death.

== See also ==
- List of Massachusetts generals in the American Civil War
- Massachusetts in the American Civil War
