= 81st New York Infantry Regiment =

- Active: August 25, 1861 – August 31, 1865
- Country: United States
- Allegiance: Union
- Branch: Infantry
- Nicknames: 2nd Oswego Regiment and Mohawk Rangers
- Engagements: Siege of Yorktown; Battle of Williamsburg; Battle of Seven Pines; Seven Days Battles; Battle of White Oak Swamp; Battle of Malvern Hill; Bermuda Hundred Campaign; Battle of Cold Harbor; Siege of Petersburg; Battle of Chaffin's Farm; Battle of Fair Oaks & Darbytown Road; Battle of Appomattox Court House

The 81st New York Infantry Regiment (a.k.a. "2nd Oswego Regiment" and "Mohawk Rangers") was an infantry regiment in the Union Army during the American Civil War.

== Service ==
The 81st New York Infantry was organized at Albany, New York beginning February 18, 1862, and mustered on December 20, 1861, through February 20, 1862, for a three-year enlistment under the command of Colonel Edwin Rose.

The regiment was attached to the 3rd Brigade, 3rd Division, IV Corps, Army of the Potomac, to June 1862. 2nd Brigade, 2nd Division, IV Corps, to June 1862. 1st Brigade, 2nd Division, IV Corps, December 1862. Naglee's Brigade, Department of North Carolina, to January 1863. 1st Brigade, 2nd Division, XVIII Corps, Department of North Carolina, to February 1863. 1st Brigade, 1st Division, XVIII Corps, Department of the South, to April 1863. District of Beaufort, North Carolina, XVIII Corps, to October 1863. Newport News, Virginia, Department of Virginia and North Carolina, to January 1864. District of the Currituck, Department of Virginia and North Carolina, to March 1864. 1st Brigade, Heckman's Division, Department of Virginia and North Carolina, to April 1864. 1st Brigade, 1st Division, XVIII Corps, Army of the James, to December 1864. 1st Brigade, 3rd Division, XXIV Corps, to July 1865. 1st Independent Brigade, XXIV Corps, to August 1865.

The 81st New York Infantry mustered out of service on August 31, 1865.

== Detailed service ==
Organized at Albany, NY, from December 20, 1861, to February 20, 1862. Left State for Washington, DC, March 5, 1862. Attached to 3rd Brigade, 3rd Division, 4th Army Corps, Army of the Potomac, to June 1862. 2nd Brigade, 2nd Division, 4th Army Corps, to June 1862. 1st Brigade, 2nd Division, 4th Army Corps, to December 1862. Naglee's Brigade, Dept. of North Carolina, to January 1863. 1st Brigade, 2nd Division, 18th Army Corps, Dept. of North Carolina, to February 1863. 1st Brigade, 1st Division, 18th Army Corps, Dept. of the South, to April 1863. District of Beaufort, NC, 18th Army Corps, to October 1863. Newport News, VA, Dept. of Virginia and North Carolina, to January 1864. District of the Currituck, Dept. of Virginia and North Carolina, to March 1864. 1st Brigade, Heckman's Division, Dept. of Virginia and North Carolina, to April 1864. 1st Brigade, 1st Division, 18th Army Corps, Army of the James, to December 1864. 1st Brigade, 3rd Division, 24th Army Corps, to July 1865. 1st Independent Brigade, 24th Army Corps, to August 1865.

Duty at Kalorama Heights, Defenses of Washington, DC, March 7–13, 1862. They moved to the Peninsula, VA, on March 28. Siege of Yorktown April 5-May 4. Reconnaissance toward Lee's Mills April 29. Battle of Williamsburg May 5. Battle of Seven Pines or Fair Oaks May 31-June 1. Seven days before Richmond June 25-July 1. White Oak Swamp June 30. Malvern Hill July 1. At Harrison's Landing until August 16. The movement to Fortress Monroe August 16–22, and duty there until September 18. Duty at Yorktown, Norfolk, and Portsmouth until December. Moved to Morehead City, NC, December 28, 1862 – January 1, 1863; thence to Port Royal, SC, January 28–31, 1863. At St. Helena Island, SC, until April. Expedition against Charleston, SC, April 3–11. I moved to New Berne, NC, April 12–15. Expedition to relief of Little Washington April 17–21. Expedition to Trenton July 4–8. Action at Quaker Bridge July 6. Duty in the District of Beaufort, NC, until October. Moved to Newport News, VA, October 16–18, and duty there until January 1864. They moved to Portsmouth, VA, on January 22, and duty there and in the District of the Currituck until April 1864. Moved to Yorktown, VA, on April 26. Butler's operations on the south side of the James River and against Petersburg and Richmond May 4–28. Occupation of Bermuda Hundred and City Point May 5. Swift Creek or Arrowfield Church May 9–10. Operations against Fort Darling May 12–16. Battle of Drewry's Bluff May 14–16. Bermuda Hundred May 16–28. Moved to White House Landing, thence to Cold Harbor May 27–31. Battles about Cold Harbor June 1–12. Before Petersburg, June 15–18. Siege operations against Petersburg and Richmond from June 16, 1864, to April 2, 1865. Mine Explosion, Petersburg, July 30, 1864 (Reserve). Battle of Chaffin's Farm, New Market Heights, September 28–30. Battle of Fair Oaks October 27–28. Duty in trenches before Richmond until April 1865. Occupation of Richmond April 3. Pursuit of Lee April 4–9. Appomattox Court House April 9. Surrender of Lee and his army. Duty in the Department of Virginia until August. Mustered out August 31, 1865.

== Casualties ==
Regiment lost during service, 13 Officers and 129 Enlisted men were killed and mortally wounded, and 1 Officer and 98 Enlisted men by disease. Total 239.

== Commanders ==
- Colonel Edwin Rose - resigned in July 1862 due to illness
- Colonel Jacob J. De Forest
- Colonel John B. Raulston
- Colonel David B. White

== See also ==
- List of New York Civil War regiments
- New York in the Civil War
