= Battle of Fair Oaks & Darbytown Road =

1864 battle of the American Civil War

Coordinates: 37.494°N 77.334°W

- Part of the American Civil War
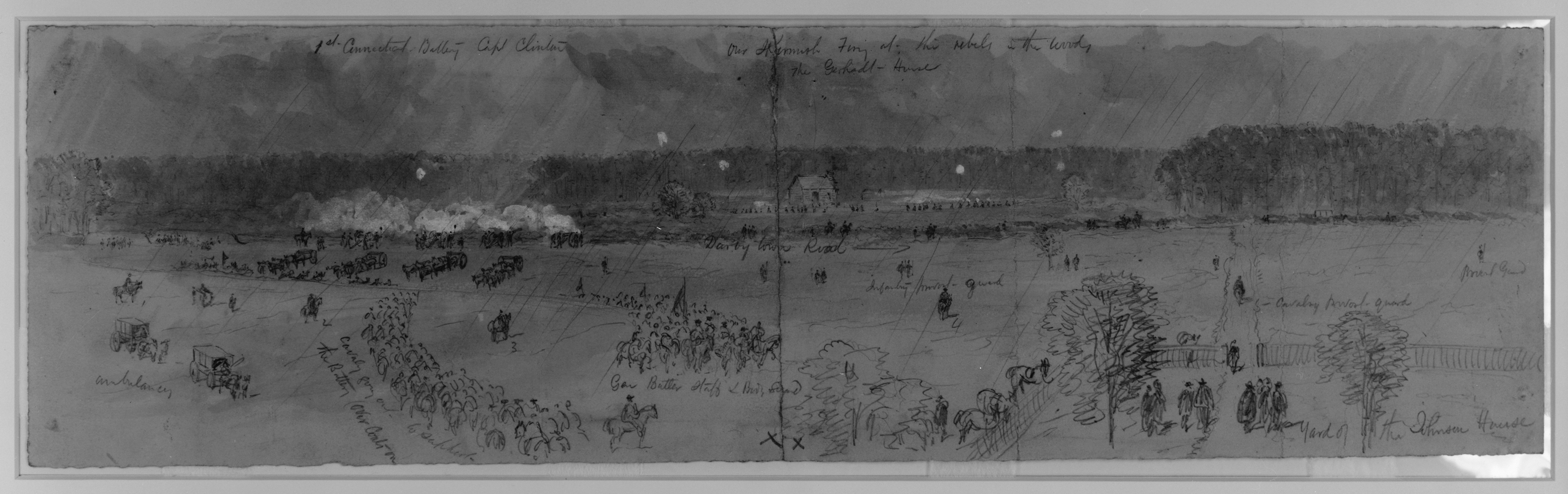
- A drawing of the action on the 27th, by Alfred Waud.
Date	October 27, 1864 – October 28, 1864
Location	Henrico County, Virginia
Result	Confederate victory

Belligerents
United States (Union)	(Confederate States of America) CSA (Confederacy)

Commanders and leaders
Benjamin F. Butler	James Longstreet

Units involved
X Corps; XVIII Corps	Longstreet's corps

Casualties and losses
1,603	100

The Battle of Fair Oaks & Darbytown Road (also known as the Second Battle of Fair Oaks) was fought on October 27–28, 1864, in Henrico County, Virginia, as part of the Richmond-Petersburg Campaign of the American Civil War.

In combination with movements against the Boydton Plank Road at Petersburg, Maj. Gen. Benjamin Butler attacked the Richmond defenses along Darbytown Road with the X Corps. The XVIII Corps marched north to Fair Oaks where it was soundly repulsed by Maj. Gen. Charles W. Field's Confederate division. Confederate forces counterattacked, taking some 600 prisoners. The Richmond defenses remained intact. Of Lt. Gen. Ulysses S. Grant's offensives north of the James River, this was repulsed most easily. The Medal of Honor was awarded to First Lieutenant William Rufus Shafter for his actions. Union casualties were 1,603, Confederates fewer than 100.

== Order of battle ==
=== Union ===
The following Union Army units and commanders fought in the Battle of Fair Oaks & Darbytown Road. It is compiled from the official tabulation of casualties, so includes only units which sustained casualties.

==== Army of the James ====
MG Benjamin F. Butler

===== X Corps =====
BG Alfred H. Terry

Division	Brigade	Regiments and Others
First Division; BG Adelbert Ames	First Brigade Col Alvin C. Voris	39th Illinois; 62nd Ohio; 67th Ohio; 85th Pennsylvania (detachment)
First Division; BG Adelbert Ames	Second Brigade Col Joseph C. Abbott	6th Connecticut; 7th Connecticut; 3rd New Hampshire; 7th New Hampshire; 16th New York Heavy Artillery (7 companies)
First Division; BG Adelbert Ames	Third Brigade Col Harris M. Plaisted	10th Connecticut; 11th Maine; 24th Massachusetts; 100th New York
Second Division; BG Robert S. Foster	First Brigade Col Newton Martin Curtis	3rd New York; 112th New York; 117th New York; 142nd New York
Second Division; BG Robert S. Foster	Second Brigade Col Galusha Pennypacker	47th New York; 76th Pennsylvania; 97th Pennsylvania; 203rd Pennsylvania
Second Division; BG Robert S. Foster	Third Brigade Col Louis Bell	13th Indiana (3 companies); 9th Maine; 115th New York
Third Division; BG Joseph R. Hawley	First Brigade Col James Shaw Jr.	7th U.S. Colored Troops; 9th U.S. Colored Troops; 41st U.S. Colored Troops (Company A)
Third Division; BG Joseph R. Hawley	Second Brigade Col Ulysses Doubleday	29th Connecticut; 8th U.S. Colored Troops; 45th U.S. Colored Troops (6 companies)
Third Division; BG Joseph R. Hawley	Artillery Brigade Ltc Richard Jackson	1st U.S., Batteries C & D

===== XVIII Corps =====
MG Godfrey Weitzel

Division	Brigade	Regiments and Others
First Division; BG Gilman Marston	First Brigade Ltc John B. Raulston	13th New Hampshire; 81st New York; 98th New York; 139th New York
First Division; BG Gilman Marston	Second Brigade Col Edgar M. Cullen	5th Maryland; 10th New Hampshire; 92nd New York (detachment); 96th New York; 118th New York
First Division; BG Gilman Marston	Third Brigade Ltc Joab N. Patterson	21st Connecticut; 40th Massachusetts; 2nd New Hampshire; 58th Pennsylvania; 188th Pennsylvania
First Division; BG Gilman Marston	Unattached	Sharpshooters; Pioneers; 8th Connecticut: Col John E. Ward
Second Division; BG Charles A. Heckman	First Brigade [not engaged]	
Second Division; BG Charles A. Heckman	Second Brigade Col Edward H. Ripley	8th Maine; 9th Vermont
Second Division; BG Charles A. Heckman	Third Brigade Col Harrison S. Fairchild	89th New York; 148th New York; 2nd Pennsylvania Heavy Artillery, Company G; 19th Wisconsin
Third Division	First Brigade Col John H. Holman; Ltc Abial G. Chamberlain	1st U.S. Colored Troops; 22nd U.S. Colored Troops; 37th U.S. Colored Troops
Third Division	Second Brigade Col Alonzo G. Draper	5th U.S. Colored Troops; 36th U.S. Colored Troops; 38th U.S. Colored Troops
Third Division	Unattached	2nd U.S. Colored Cavalry (dismounted)
Artillery Division		New York Light Artillery, 16th Battery; 1st Pennsylvania Light Artillery, Battery A
Cavalry Division; Col Robert M. West	First Brigade Col George W. Lewis	3rd New York; 5th Pennsylvania
Cavalry Division; Col Robert M. West	Second Brigade Col Samuel P. Spear	1st District of Columbia (Battalion); 11th Pennsylvania
Cavalry Division; Col Robert M. West	Third Brigade Col Andrew W. Evans	1st Maryland; 1st New York Mounted Rifles
Cavalry Division; Col Robert M. West	Artillery Brigade	Wisconsin Light, 4th Battery; 1st U.S., Battery B

=== Confederate ===
The following Confederate army units and commanders fought at the battle.

==== Army of Northern Virginia ====
===== First Corps =====
LTG James Longstreet

Division	Brigade	Regiments and Others
Field's Division; MG Charles W. Field	Anderson's Brigade BG George T. Anderson	7th Georgia; 8th Georgia; 9th Georgia; 11th Georgia; 59th Georgia
Field's Division; MG Charles W. Field	Law's Brigade Col William F. Perry	4th Alabama; 15th Alabama; 44th Alabama; 47th Alabama; 48th Alabama
Field's Division; MG Charles W. Field	Gregg's Brigade Col Frederick S. Bass	3rd Arkansas; 1st Texas; 4th Texas; 5th Texas
Field's Division; MG Charles W. Field	Benning's Brigade Col Dudley M. Du Bose	2nd Georgia; 15th Georgia; 17th Georgia; 20th Georgia
Field's Division; MG Charles W. Field	Bratton's Brigade BG John Bratton	1st South Carolina; 5th South Carolina; 6th South Carolina; 2nd South Carolina Rifles

===== Fourth Corps =====
Division	Brigade	Regiments and Others
Hoke's Division; MG Robert F. Hoke	Hagood's Brigade BG Johnson Hagood	7th South Carolina (battalion); 11th South Carolina; 21st South Carolina; 25th South Carolina; 27th South Carolina
Hoke's Division; MG Robert F. Hoke	Colquitt's Brigade BG Alfred H. Colquitt	6th Georgia; 19th Georgia; 23rd Georgia; 27th Georgia; 28th Georgia
Hoke's Division; MG Robert F. Hoke	Clingman's Brigade BG Thomas L. Clingman	8th North Carolina; 31st North Carolina; 51st North Carolina; 61st North Carolina
Hoke's Division; MG Robert F. Hoke	Kirkland's Brigade BG William Whedbee Kirkland	17th North Carolina; 42nd North Carolina; 66th North Carolina

===== Cavalry Corps =====
Division	Brigade	Regiments and Others
W. H. F. Lee's Division; MG W. H. F. Lee	Barringer's Brigade BG Rufus Barringer	1st North Carolina Cavalry; 2nd North Carolina Cavalry; 3rd North Carolina Cavalry; 5th North Carolina Cavalry
W. H. F. Lee's Division; MG W. H. F. Lee	Beale's Brigade BG Richard L. T. Beale	9th Virginia Cavalry; 10th Virginia Cavalry; 13th Virginia Cavalry
W. H. F. Lee's Division; MG W. H. F. Lee	Dearing's Brigade BG James Dearing	8th Georgia Cavalry; 4th North Carolina Cavalry; 16th North Carolina Cavalry
Butler's Division; MG Matthew Butler	Butler's Brigade Col Hugh Kerr Aiken	4th South Carolina Cavalry; 5th South Carolina Cavalry; 6th South Carolina Cavalry
Butler's Division; MG Matthew Butler	Young's Brigade Col J.F. Waring	10th Georgia Cavalry; Cobb's (Georgia) Legion; Phillip's (Georgia) Legion; Jeff. Davis (Mississippi) Legion
	Horse Artillery Maj R. Preston Chew	Hart's (South Carolina) Battery; Graham's (Virginia) Battery; McGregor's (Virginia) Battery

=== Abbreviations used ===
==== Military rank ====
- Gen = General
- LTG = Lieutenant General
- MG = Major General
- BG = Brigadier General
- Col = Colonel
- Ltc = Lieutenant Colonel
- Maj = Major

==== Other ====
- (w) = wounded
- (mw) = mortally wounded
- (k) = killed in action
- (c) = captured
