= 7th Connecticut Infantry Regiment =

- Active: September 1861 to August 1865
- Country: United States
- Allegiance: Union
- Branch: United States Army
- Type: Infantry
- Size: 1,000
- Engagements: American Civil War: Siege of Fort Pulaski; Battle of Secessionville; First Battle of Fort Wagner; Battle of Olustee; Battle of Drewry's Bluff; Siege of Petersburg; Battle of Chaffin's Farm; Second Battle of Fort Fisher

Commanders
- Notable commanders: Alfred H. Terry; Joseph R. Hawley

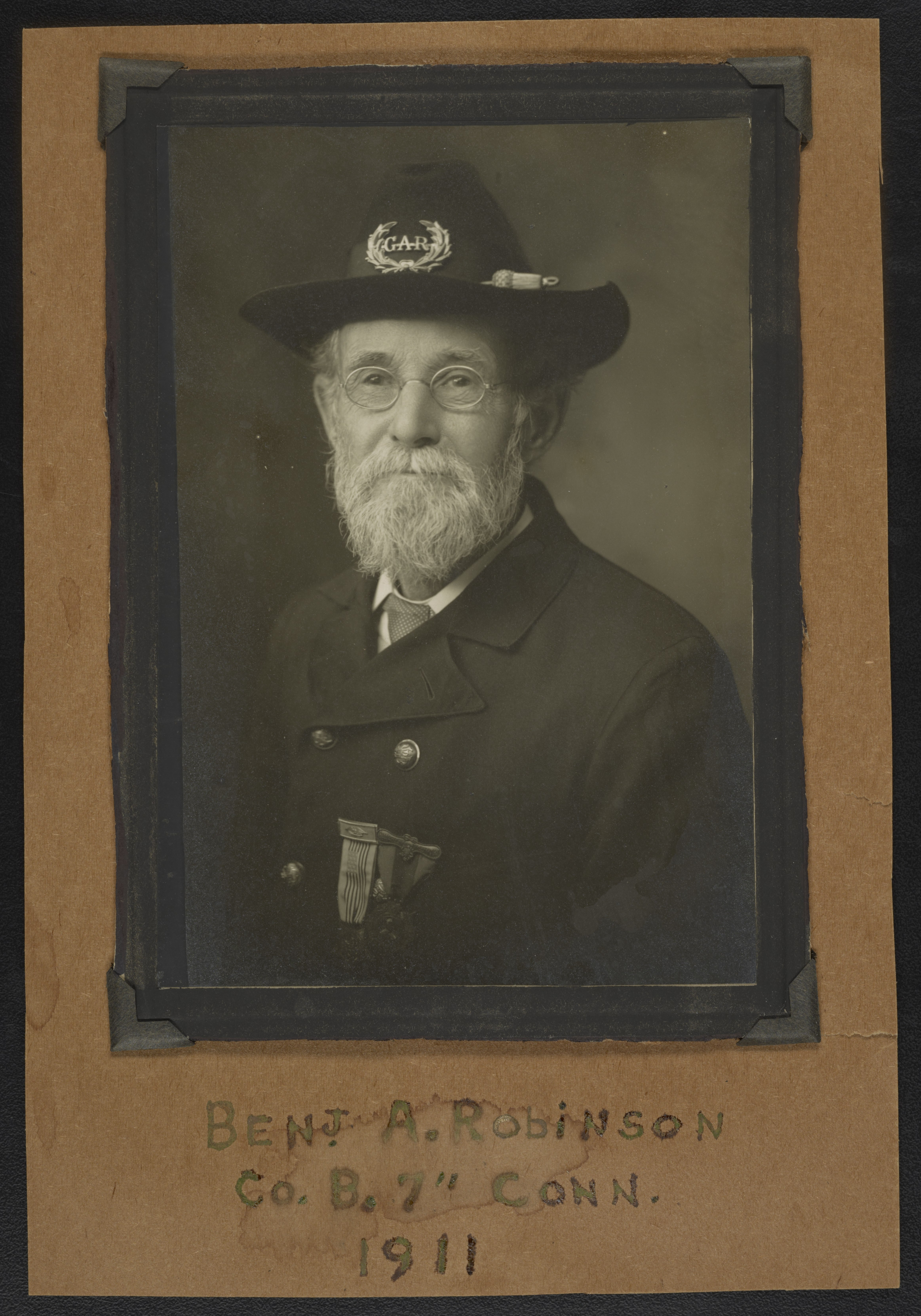
Benjamin A. Robinson, Civil War veteran, of Co. B, 7th Connecticut Infantry Regiment. He was wounded at James Island, South Carolina, Pocotaligo, South Carolina, and New Market Road, Virginia, and served as commander of Merriam Post No. 8 G.A.R. From the Liljenquist Family Collection of Civil War Photographs, Prints and Photographs Division, Library of Congress

The 7th Connecticut Infantry Regiment was an infantry regiment that served in the Union Army during the American Civil War. Because it was in the same brigade as the 7th New Hampshire Volunteer Regiment, both regiments were often jointly called the '77th New England'.

== Service ==
The 7th Connecticut Infantry Regiment was organized at New Haven, Connecticut, on September 13, 1861. It mustered out on July 20, 1865, and discharged at New Haven, Connecticut, on August 11, 1865.

In October and November 1863, the regiment's status changed. It was equipped as a "boat infantry" for the specific purpose of leading an amphibious night assault on Fort Sumter, South Carolina. Although the 7th trained at Folly Island, South Carolina, the project was ultimately ended because it was deemed impractical. After 19 November 1863, the regiment was equipped with Spencer Repeating Carbines, having been acquired by Col Joseph Hawley on an earlier trip North. https://archive.org/details/historyofseventh00walk/page/116/mode/1up

== Total strength and casualties ==
The Regiment, which numbered 1000 men, lost during service 11 Officers and 157 Enlisted men killed and mortally wounded and 4 Officers and 192 Enlisted men by disease. Total 364.

== Officers ==
- Alfred Terry, Major General, raised and led the regiment
- Joseph Roswell Hawley, Lieutenant Colonel
- Benjamin F. Skinner, Captain and company commander
- Thomas T. Minor, Surgeon of the regiment

Seagar S. Atwell, Colonel

== Enlisted men ==
- Frederick H. Dyer, drummer boy
- Pvt. Jerome Dupoy of Redding, Connecticut
- Augustus Riley Robinson of North Haven, Connecticut (1843-1885)
- Pvt. John Rowley of Ridgefield, Connecticut. He was found guilty of the murder of Pvt. Jerome Dupoy by General Court Martial and hung on September 3, 1864, in Petersburg, Virginia.
- Pvt. William Norton, Company C
- Pvt. Stephen Walkley, Company A of Southington, Connecticut
- Corporal Edward D. Phelps of New Haven, Ct, Company F, 7th Regiment Ct Volunteer Infantry, Captured at Drury's Bluff, 16 May 1864. POW at Andersonville; survived.
- Pvt. Thomas W. Leslie of Southington, enlisted Sept. 5 1861, Co. A, as Pvt. Thomas W. Lesley (subsequently corrected to Leslie), was wounded at the June 16, 1862 Battle of Secessionville, James Island, South Carolina, and was subsequently medically discharged Aug. 8, 1862 and returned home. His recuperation from his wounds was sufficient for him to enlist in 1st CT Cavalry Reg, Co L, on December 21, 1863. At some point he transferred to the Veterans Reserve Corp and stayed there until mustered out in Sept. 1865.
- William H Thorp of Montville, CT. 7th Regiment Connecticut Volunteer Infantry. Company H.
- Private John Cole, Enlisted May 24, 1777. Died June 10, 1778.7th Connecticut Regiment Commanded by Col. Heman Swift

== Principal engagements ==
- Battle of Olustee
- Siege of Fort Pulaski
- Battle of James Island
- Battery Wagner
- Battle of Drewry's Bluff
- Siege of Petersburg
- Battle of Chaffin's Farm
- Second Battle of Fort Fisher

== See also ==
- List of Connecticut Civil War units
- Lists of American Civil War Regiments by State
