= 96th New York Infantry Regiment =

- Active: February 20, 1862 - February 6, 1866
- Country: United States
- Allegiance: Union
- Branch: Infantry
- Nickname: Plattsburg Regiment
- Engagements: Siege of Yorktown; Battle of Williamsburg; Battle of Seven Pines; Seven Days Battles; Battle of Garnett's & Golding's Farm; Battle of White Oak Swamp; Battle of Malvern Hill; Battle of Kinston; Battle of Goldsborough Bridge; Bermuda Hundred Campaign; Battle of Cold Harbor; Siege of Petersburg; Battle of Chaffin's Farm; Battle of Fair Oaks & Darbytown Road

The 96th New York Infantry Regiment (a.k.a. "Plattsburg Regiment") was an infantry regiment in the Union Army during the American Civil War.

== Service ==
The 96th New York Infantry was organized at Plattsburgh, New York February 20-March 7, 1862 and mustered in for three-years service beginning February 20, 1862 under the command of Colonel James Fairman.

The regiment was attached to 3rd Brigade, 3rd Division, IV Corps, Army of the Potomac, to June 1862. 2nd Brigade, 2nd Division, IV Corps, to September 1862. Wessell's Brigade, Division at Suffolk, VII Corps, Department of Virginia, to December 1862. 1st Brigade, 1st Division, Department of North Carolina, to January 1863. 1st Brigade, 4th Division, XVIII Corps, Department of North Carolina, to May 1863. District of the Albemarle, Department of North Carolina, to October 1863. Newport News, Virginia, Department of Virginia and North Carolina, to December 1863. District of the Currituck, Department of Virginia and North Carolina, to March 1864. 1st Brigade, Heckman's Division, XVIII Corps, to April 1864. 1st Brigade, 1st Division, XVIII Corps, Army of the James, to July 1864. 2nd Brigade, 1st Division, XVIII Corps, to December 1864. 2nd Brigade, 3rd Division, XXIV Corps, to June 1865. 1st Brigade, 3rd Division, XXIV Corps, to July 1865. 1st Independent Brigade, XXIV Corps, to August 1865. Department of Virginia to February 1866.

The 96th New York Infantry mustered out of service at City Point, Virginia on February 6, 1866.

== Detailed service ==
Left New York for Washington, D.C., March 11, 1862. Ordered to the Virginia Peninsula March 28, 1862. Siege of Yorktown, Va., April 5-May 4. Battle of Williamsburg May 5. Seven Pines May 29. Fair Oaks May 30. Battle of Seven Pines or Fair Oaks May 31- June 1. Seven days before Richmond June 25-July 1. Bottom's Bridge June 27–29. White Oak Swamp June 30. Malvern Hill July 1. At Harrison's Landing until August 16. Moved to Fort Monroe August 16–23, then to Suffolk September 18, and duty there until December. Reconnaissance to Franklin on the Blackwater October 3. Ordered to New Bern, N.C., December 4. Foster's Expedition to Goldsborough December 11–20. Actions at Kinston December 14, Whitehall December 16, and Goldsborough December 17.

Duty at and in the vicinity of New Bern, N.C., until May 1863. At Plymouth, N.C., and in the District of the Albemarle until October 1863. Expedition to relief of Little Washington April 7–10. Expedition from Plymouth to Gardiner's Bridge and Williamston July 5–7 (detachment). Expedition from Plymouth to Foster's Mills July 26–29. Moved to Newport News, Va., October, and duty there until December. Scout from Great Bridge to Indiantown, N.C., October 13.

Duty in District of the Currituck until April 1864. Ordered to Yorktown, Va., April 28. Butler's operations on the south side of the James River and against Petersburg and Richmond May 4–28. Occupation of Bermuda Hundred and City Point, Va., May 5. Swift Creek or Arrow field Church May 8–10. Operations against Fort Darling May 12–16. Battle of Drury's Bluff May 14–16. Bermuda Hundred May 16–27. Moved to White House, then to Cold Harbor May 27–31. Battles about Cold Harbor June 1–12.

Before Petersburg June 15–18. Siege operations against Petersburg and Richmond June 16, 1864 to April 2, 1865. Mine Explosion. Petersburg, July 30, 1864 (reserve). In the trenches before Petersburg and on the Bermuda Hundred front until September 26. Battle of Chaffin's Farm, New Market Heights, September 28–30. Battle of Fair Oaks October 27–28. Duty in the trenches before Richmond until April 1865. Occupation of Richmond April 3. Duty in the Department of Virginia until February 1866

== Casualties ==
The regiment lost a total of 228 men during service; 9 officers and 59 enlisted men killed or mortally wounded, 2 officers and 158 enlisted men died of disease.

== Commanders ==
- Colonel James Fairman
- Colonel Charles O. Gray - killed in action at the Battle of Kinston
- Colonel Edgar M. Cullen
- Colonel Stephen Moffitt

== See also ==
- List of New York Civil War regiments
- New York in the Civil War
