= Battle of Darbytown and New Market Roads order of battle: Union =

The following Union Army units and commanders fought in the Battle of Darbytown and New Market Roads (October 7, 1864) during the Petersburg Campaign of the American Civil War. Order of battle is compiled from the official tabulation of casualties and includes only units which sustained casualties.

== Military Rank Abbreviations Used ==
- MG = Major General
- BG = Brigadier General
- Col = Colonel
- Ltc = Lieutenant Colonel
- Maj = Major
- Cpt = Captain

=== Other ===
- w = wounded
- mw = mortally wounded
- k = killed
- c = captured

== Army of the James ==
=== X Corps ===
MG David B. Birney

Division	Brigade	Regiments and Others
First Division; MG Alfred H. Terry	First Brigade Col Francis B. Pond	39th Illinois; 62nd Ohio; 67th Ohio; 85th Pennsylvania
First Division; MG Alfred H. Terry	Second Brigade Col Joseph C. Abbott	6th Connecticut; 7th Connecticut; 3rd New Hampshire; 7th New Hampshire; 16th New York Heavy Artillery (7 Companies)
First Division; MG Alfred H. Terry	Third Brigade Col Harris M. Plaisted	10th Connecticut; 11th Maine; 24th Massachusetts; 100th New York
First Division; MG Alfred H. Terry	Artillery Brigade Ltc Richard H. Jackson	New Jersey Light, 5th Battery; 3rd Rhode Island Light, Battery C; 1st U.S., Batteries C & D; 3rd U.S., Battery E; 4th U.S., Battery D
Cavalry Division; BG August V. Kautz	First Brigade Col Robert M. West	3rd New York; 5th Pennsylvania
Cavalry Division; BG August V. Kautz	Second Brigade Col Samuel P. Spear	1st District of Columbia Battalion; 11th Pennsylvania
Cavalry Division; BG August V. Kautz	Artillery Brigade Lt Dorman L. Noggle	Wisconsin Light, 4th Battery; 1st U.S., Battery B
