= Haldimand S. Putnam =

American Union Army colonel (1835–1863)

Haldimand Sumner Putnam
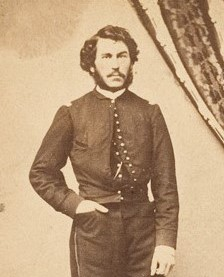
- Born: October 15, 1835; Cornish, New Hampshire
- Died: July 18, 1863 (aged 27) Fort Wagner, South Carolina
- Allegiance: (United States) Union
- Branch: United States Army
- Service years: 1857–1863
- Rank: Brevet Colonel
- Commands: 7th New Hampshire Volunteer Regiment
- Conflicts: American Civil War: First Battle of Bull Run; Second Battle of Fort Wagner †

Haldimand Sumner Putnam (October 15, 1835 – July 18, 1863) was a brevet colonel in the Union Army during the American Civil War. He was killed at the Second Battle of Fort Wagner.

== Early life ==
Putnam was born in Cornish, New Hampshire on October 15, 1835. He was the son of John L. Putnam, who was both a farmer and Judge of Probate for Sullivan County. Haldimand Putnam enrolled in the West Point Military Academy at the age of sixteen, and graduated in 1857 with high honors.

== Career ==
Soon after graduating, he was brevetted a second lieutenant in the Corps of Topographical Engineers. He immediately joined the United States Army, and was stationed at several points throughout the western frontier. He soon was commissioned second lieutenant in the Engineer Corps, and later promoted to first lieutenant.

=== American Civil War ===
When the war started, he was ordered to carry a dispatch to Fort Pickens. He accomplished his mission, but on his return north, he was seized by the Confederates at Montgomery, Alabama. He was imprisoned for several days. After his release, he was placed under the command of General Irvin McDowell. He participated in the First Battle of Bull Run, and gained the brevet of major for gallantry. In October, he returned to New Hampshire to take command of the 7th New Hampshire Volunteer Regiment, which had been raised by Lieutenant Colonel Joseph Carter Abbott. Putnam became colonel of the regiment in December 1861. It was stationed first at Fort Jefferson, Tortugas Island, then St. Augustine, Florida, then Port Royal, South Carolina, and then around Charleston, South Carolina. In 1863, Putnam commanded a brigade in the Stono Inlet expedition as well as in the capture of Morris Island. He was promoted to captain in the Regular Army in March 1863. However, he had been an acting brigadier general for several months preceding the Second Battle of Fort Wagner, on July 18, 1863. In the battle, he led the 2nd Brigade, which was composed of the 7th New Hampshire, 62nd Ohio, 67th Ohio, and 100th New York. He was killed by a musket ball to the head while rallying his men. His body was not recovered.
