= Battle of Darbytown and New Market Roads order of battle =

The order of battle for the Battle of Darbytown and New Market Roads includes:

- Battle of Darbytown and New Market Roads order of battle: Confederate
- Battle of Darbytown and New Market Roads order of battle: Union
