= 199th Pennsylvania Infantry Regiment =

Union Army infantry regiment

199th Pennsylvania Volunteer Infantry
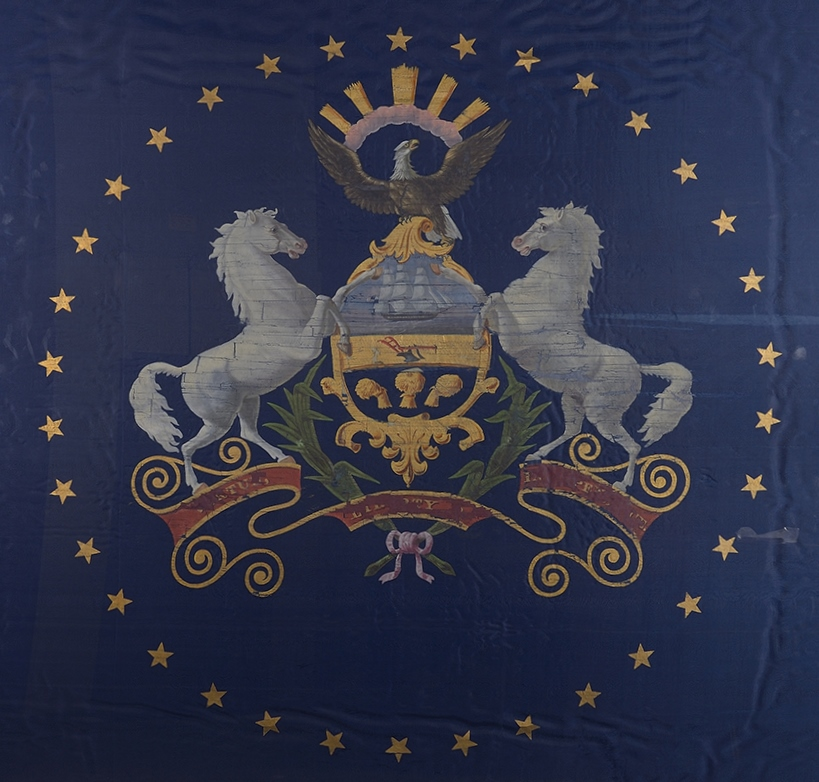
- State Flag of Pennsylvania, circa 1863.
- Active: October 1864–28 June 1865
- Country: United States of America
- Allegiance: Union
- Branch: Union Army
- Role: Infantry
- Size: 1,462 (total enrollment)
- Engagements: American Civil War

The 199th Regiment Pennsylvania Volunteer Infantry, alternately known as the Commercial Regiment, was an infantry regiment of the Union Army in the American Civil War. Raised in Philadelphia in late 1864, the regiment enlisted for one year and was sent to the Army of the James during the Siege of Petersburg. During the Third Battle of Petersburg it assaulted Forts Gregg and Alexander, then pursued the retreating Confederate Army of Northern Virginia, fighting at Rice's Station and Appomattox Court House. Following the Confederate surrender at Appomattox, the regiment moved to Richmond, where it mustered out in late June 1865.

== History ==
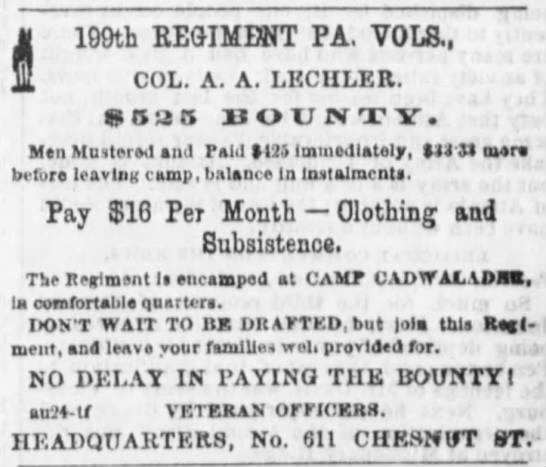
A newspaper recruiting advertisement for the regiment

The regiment was organized at Camp Cadwalader near Philadelphia during August, September and October 1864, for a term of one year under the command of staff officer Colonel James C. Briscoe. It was also known as the Commercial Regiment, and many of its soldiers had previously served in other regiments, including Lieutenant Colonel Ambrose A. Lechler, former Colonel of the 176th Pennsylvania Infantry. The regiment was sent to the front in October and took positions on the extreme right of the Army of the James on the New Market Road at Deep Bottom Landing, joining the 1st Brigade of the 1st Division of X Corps. Shortly after fortifying its position, the 199th went into winter quarters with the army, during which it conducted training while also being employed in picket duty, fortification building, and road construction. In December it was transferred to the newly formed XXIV Corps, still with the 1st Brigade of the 1st Division. With strict discipline and sanitation, the regiment was capable of active service when the northern hemisphere spring arrived.

The division crossed the James River on 28 March and moved southwards through the night to arrive in front of the Confederate fortifications on 29 March. The division participated in the Third Battle of Petersburg, during which it attacked Forts Gregg and Alexander on 2 April. The regiment attacked Fort Gregg on the right of the brigade, commanded by Brevet Brigadier General Thomas O. Osborn. Advancing in line of battle at the head of the division, the 199th was to the left of the 67th Ohio and the 39th Illinois. It counterattacked the Church Road with the brigade at 09:00, forcing back Confederate troops from a salient that they had gained in a counterattack earlier that day. At 13:00 the brigade was committed to the attack on Fort Gregg, advancing through a hail of fire. Briscoe was hit in the leg within the last 300 yards to the fort, but continued onward with others from the regiment into the ditch in front of the fort, partially filled with water. There, First Lieutenant Oliver Sproul of Company H planted the colors of the 39th Illinois in the parapet of the fort after the 39th's color bearer was shot. Along with other Union troops, the men of the regiment advanced into the fort and captured it. The regiment lost eighteen killed or mortally wounded, and 91 wounded; among the latter were six officers, including Briscoe and two company commanders. Briscoe was made a brevet brigadier general for his gallantry, and was promoted to command the brigade; he was replaced by Lieutenant Colonel Robert P. Hughes.

Following the breakthrough at Petersburg, the 199th pursued the retreating Confederate Army of Northern Virginia along the Southside Railroad to Burkeville and Appomattox. The regiment fought in skirmishes, and lost two killed and one wounded at the Battle of Rice's Station on 6 April, and two killed and eight wounded at the Battle of Appomattox Court House on 9 April. The division was moved to Richmond and encamped two miles north of the city shortly after the Confederate surrender at Appomattox. The regiment remained at the camp until it was mustered out on 28 June, with its recruits and Briscoe being transferred to the 188th Pennsylvania Infantry, which mustered out on 14 December. During its service, the regiment lost two officers and thirty men killed or died of wounds and 52 men to disease, out of a total enrollment of 1,462 officers and men.

== See also ==
- List of Pennsylvania Civil War regiments
- Pennsylvania in the Civil War
