= 62nd Ohio Infantry Regiment =

- Active: September 17, 1861, to September 1, 1865
- Country: United States
- Allegiance: Union
- Branch: Union Army
- Type: Infantry
- Engagements: First Battle of Kernstown; Battle of Winchester; Battle of Port Republic; Seven Days Battles; Battle of Fort Wagner; Siege of Charleston; Battle of Drewry's Bluff; Siege of Petersburg; Battle of Chaffin's Farm; Appomattox Campaign; Battle of Appomattox Court House

The 62nd Ohio Infantry Regiment was an infantry regiment in the Union Army during the American Civil War.

== Service ==
The 62nd Ohio Infantry Regiment was organized in Zanesville, McConnellsville, and Somerton, Ohio, beginning September 17, 1861, and mustered in for three years service on December 24, 1861, under the command of Colonel Francis Bates Pond.

The regiment was attached to 2nd Brigade, Landers' Division, Army of the Potomac, to March 1862. 2nd Brigade, Shields' Division, Banks' V Corps, and Department of the Shenandoah, to May 1862. 2nd Brigade, Shields' Division, Department of the Rappahannock, to July 1862. 3rd Brigade, 2nd Division, IV Corps, Army of the Potomac, to September 1862. Ferry's Brigade, Division at Suffolk, Virginia, VII Corps, Department of Virginia, to January 1863. 1st Brigade, 3rd Division, XVIII Corps, Department of North Carolina, to February 1863. 3rd Brigade, 2nd Division, XVIII Corps, Department of the South, to April 1863. United States forces, Folly Island, South Carolina, X Corps, Department of the South, to June 1863. 1st Brigade, Folly Island, South Carolina, X Corps, to July 1863. 1st Brigade, 2nd Division, X Corps, Morris Island, South Carolina, July 1863. 2nd Brigade, Morris Island, South Carolina, X Corps, to October 1863. Howell's Brigade, Gordon's Division, Folly Island, South Carolina, X Corps, to December 1863. District Hilton Head, South Carolina, X Corps, to April 1864. 1st Brigade, 1st Division, X Corps, Army of the James, Department of Virginia and North Carolina, to December 1864. 1st Brigade, 1st Division, XXIV Corps, to September 1865.

The 62nd Ohio Infantry ceased to exist on September 1, 1865, when it was consolidated with the 67th Ohio Infantry.

== Detailed Service ==
This regiment was organized at Zanesville, McConnellsville and Somerton from Sept. 17 to Dec. 24, 1861, to serve for three years. In Jan., 1862, it went by rail to Cumberland, Md., and there joined the forces under the command of Brig-Gen. Lander, then in camp at Patterson's Creek. After a summer spent in strenuous activity in Virginia, in December it made several reconnaissances from Suffolk to Blackwater, in one of which a heavy skirmish was had with the enemy. It then went by transports to South Carolina and in the desperate affair at Fort Wagner in July, 1863, it lost 150 men killed, wounded and missing. In January, 1864, it re-enlisted and received the usual 30 days' veteran furlough. During the spring, summer and fall of 1864 it was almost continually under fire not a movement could be made without encountering the enemy. The men of the regiment were compelled to keep an incessant vigil and for weeks at a time dared not throw off their accouterments. In the spring of 1865 the regiment took part in the assault on the Confederate works below Petersburg, and on April 2 it was one of the foremost regiments in the assault on Fort Gregg. It also participated in the action at Appomattox Court House. About Sept. 1, 1865, it was consolidated with the 67th Ohio, and thereafter lost its identity the name of the 67th being retained.

== Casualties ==
The regiment lost a total of 244 men during service; 11 officers and 102 enlisted men killed or mortally wounded, 2 officers and 129 enlisted men died of disease.

== Commanders ==
- Colonel Francis Bates Pond

== See also ==
- List of Ohio Civil War units
- Ohio in the Civil War
- Seven Days Battles
- Battle of Fort Wagner
- Siege of Charleston
- Siege of Petersburg
- Battle of Chaffin's Farm
- Appomattox Campaign
