= Robert Patterson Hughes =

United States Army general

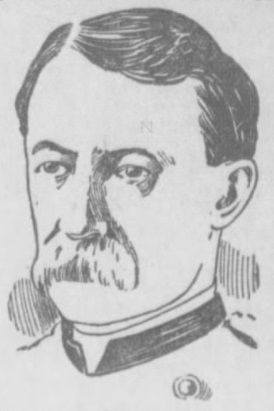
- Ness County Echo (Ness City, Kansas), March 15, 1902
- Born: April 11, 1839; Canonsburg, Pennsylvania
- Died: October 27, 1909 (aged 70); Philadelphia, Pennsylvania
- Burial place: Grove Street Cemetery, New Haven, Connecticut
- Alma mater: Jefferson College (attended)
- Spouse: Clara Henrietta Terry (m. 1876-1891, her death)
- Relatives: Alfred Terry (brother-in-law)
- Military career
- Allegiance: Union; United States
- Branch: Union Army; United States Army
- Service years: 1861–1865 (Union); 1865-1903 (United States)
- Rank: Major General
- Units: U.S. Army Infantry Branch; U.S. Army Inspector General's Office
- Commands: 199th Pennsylvania Infantry Regiment; Inspector General of the United States Army (acting); First Separate Brigade, Military Department of the Visayas; First Military District of the Philippines; Military Department of the Visayas; Department of California
- Conflicts: American Civil War; American Indian Wars; Spanish–American War; Philippine–American War

Robert Patterson Hughes (April 11, 1839 – October 27, 1909) was an American military officer. He served from 1861 until 1903 and attained the rank of major general.

A native of Canonsburg, Pennsylvania, he was educated at local academies and taught school before attending Jefferson College. He left college to join the Union Army for the American Civil War, and rose to the rank of colonel by brevet. After the war, Hughes received a commission in the United States Army. He participated in engagements of the American Indian Wars, and served for several years as aide-de-camp to Alfred Terry, who became his brother-in-law.

By the mid-1880s, Hughes had been promoted to major and began to serve in various commands as an inspector general. During the Spanish–American War in 1898, he was promoted to brigadier general and served on the staff of Major General Elwell Stephen Otis, the commander of Eighth Army Corps during its duty in the Philippines. Hughes continued to serve in the Philippines during the Philippine–American War and was assigned as commander of the Military Department of the Visayas. After returning to the United States, Hughes was promoted to major general as commander of the Department of California.

Hughes retired upon reaching the mandatory retirement age of 64 in 1903. He lived in Philadelphia, where he died on October 27, 1909. He was buried at Grove Street Cemetery in New Haven, Connecticut.

== Early life ==
Hughes was born in Canonsburg, Pennsylvania on April 11, 1839, a son of Samuel L. Hughes and Manilla (McClelland) Hughes. He was raised in Canonsburg, Hopewell, and Buffalo in western Pennsylvania, and attended the public schools of Hopewell. He later studied at academies in Cross Creek and Buffalo, received his qualification as a school teacher, and taught in the local schools. He attended Jefferson College in Canonsburg as a member of the class of 1860, but left before graduating in order to join the military during the American Civil War.

== Start of career ==
On April 25, 1861, Hughes enlisted in the Union Army for the American Civil War, joining Company E, 12th Pennsylvania Infantry Regiment as a private. The 12th Pennsylvania was one of the many regiments created to perform three months' service at the start of the war, and Hughes served until he was mustered out with the rest of his unit on August 5, 1861.

On October 11, 1861, Hughes joined the 85th Pennsylvania Infantry Regiment and received his commission as a first lieutenant. He was promoted to captain on May 20, 1862. On December 6, 1864, he was discharged so he could join the 199th Pennsylvania Infantry Regiment. On December 7, he was commissioned as the 199th's lieutenant colonel, its second-in-command. When his commander was promoted to brigadier general and command of a brigade, Hughes ascended to command of the regiment. He served through the end of the war and was discharged on June 28, 1865. Hughes received a promotion to colonel of volunteers by brevet to recognize his gallant and distinguished service during the Union Army's April 2, 1865, assault on Fort Gregg, Virginia during the Third Battle of Petersburg.

== Continued career ==
Hughes joined the United States Army after the Civil War and on July 28, 1866, he was commissioned as a captain in the 18th United States Infantry. On March 2, 1867, he received a brevet promotion to major in the regular army to recognize his conduct at Fort Gregg. On July 5, 1870, Hughes was transferred to the 3rd United States Infantry. He served in several American Indian Wars, including the Great Sioux War of 1876. During the 1876 campaign, he was assigned as aide-de-camp to his brother-in-law, Major General Alfred Terry, who commanded one of three columns of troops that fought American Indian tribes in Montana. While on Terry's staff, Hughes authored a critique of George Armstrong Custer's actions leading up to and during the Battle of the Little Bighorn. Hughes continued to serve as Terry's aide for eleven years.

On February 19, 1885, Hughes was promoted to major and assigned as inspector general of the 3rd Infantry Regiment. He continued to serve in the Army's Inspector General department and was promoted to lieutenant colonel on March 11, 1885, and colonel on August 31, 1888. During the 1888-1889 illness of Roger Jones, the Inspector General of the United States Army, Hughes acted in Jones' place. His subsequent assignments included inspector general of the Military Division of the Atlantic and the same position with the Department of the East.

== Spanish–American War ==
During the Spanish–American War, Hughes served in the Philippines as a member of the staff of Elwell Stephen Otis, who commanded the Eighth Army Corps. He received promotion to brigadier general of Volunteers on June 3, 1898, and was assigned as the corps chief of staff on June 23. He subsequently served as provost marshal for the city of Manila and commander of a specially created provost marshal unit, the First Separate Brigade. When a large fire threatened to consume the city in February 1899, Hughes led the army's response, and was officially commended by Otis. He later served as commander of the First Military District.

Hughes remained in the Philippines during the Philippine–American War and in May 1900 he was appointed to the U.S. commission that was assigned to negotiate with Filipino insurgents. On May 25, 1900, he was named commander of the Department of the Visayas. On February 25, 1901, he was promoted to brigadier general in the regular army.

== Later career ==
After his return from the Philippines, Hughes commanded the Army's Department of California. He was promoted to major general on April 1, 1902. Hughes concluded his military service upon reaching the mandatory retirement age of 64 in April 1903.

Hughes was active in the Military Order of the Loyal Legion of the United States. In addition, he was active in the United Spanish War Veterans, and the post in Buffalo, Pennsylvania was named for him.

== Death and burial ==
In retirement, Hughes was a resident of the Overbrook neighborhood of Philadelphia. He died at his home on October 27, 1909. Hughes was buried at Grove Street Cemetery in New Haven, Connecticut, his wife's hometown.

In 1910, Fort Hughes, a Coast Artillery post on Caballo Island in Manila Bay, was named for him. The site was an active U.S. Army post through World War II and is now controlled by the Philippine Navy. The remnants of old fortifications and batteries are still visible, but the island is closed to the public.

== Family ==
In 1876, Hughes married Clara Henrietta Terry (1835–1891), the sister of Major General Alfred Terry. They had no children, and after his wife's 1891 death, Hughes frequently visited her family in Connecticut.
