= Greenwich in the American Civil War =

The town of Greenwich, Connecticut contributed 437 men to twenty-six Connecticut regiments during the American Civil War. Greenwich soldiers fought in almost every major Union campaign, including Bull Run, Gettysburg and the siege of Petersburg. Approximately half of the Greenwich soldiers served in two infantry regiments, the 10th Connecticut Infantry and 17th Connecticut Infantry.

== Greenwich before the Civil War ==
On the eve of the Civil War, Greenwich was a small agricultural community with a population just over 6,500. Most Greenwich residents, like those of Connecticut, supported the Union cause. However, there was an undercurrent of anti-war sentiment, due to the high volume of trade with the south.

Anti-slavery advocates were well represented in Greenwich and Connecticut in the lead-up to the Civil War. But, attitudes toward slavery were not uniform as many working men feared competition from freed slaves. The last slaves in Greenwich were freed by 1823. Freed slaves had lived in Greenwich for many years prior to the Civil War. They worked and lived alongside their white employers on Greenwich farms, performing the same labors and receiving the same pay.

== Greenwich at the start of the Civil War ==
Greenwich men readily volunteered when President Abraham Lincoln made the call for 75,000 volunteers to defend the Union after the attack on Fort Sumter. In October 1861, the town of Greenwich authorized the payment of an enlistment bounty of $100 for recruits serving a nine-month enlistment in the Union Army. By 1863, as the war was dragging on and Northern morale ebbed, the town of Greenwich increased the bounty to $300 per recruit and the term of service was extended to three years. For an equal sum, Greenwich citizens were allowed to hire substitutes to fight in their place.

== Greenwich Soldiers in Connecticut Regiments ==
Greenwich men served in twenty-six Connecticut regiments. A few Greenwich men also enlisted in New York regiments. These soldiers fought in almost every major civil war campaign, including the battles of First Bull Run, Antietam, Second Bull Run, Cold Harbor, Gettysburg as well as the siege of Charleston and the trench battles of Petersburg. Approximately half of Greenwich soldiers fought in two infantry regiments, the 10th Connecticut Volunteers and the 17th Connecticut Volunteers.

Major Daniel M. Mead

10th Connecticut Volunteers

Greenwich citizens were particularly well represented in the 10th Connecticut Volunteers. Company I, of the 10th regiment consisted entirely of Greenwich men. The company's first commander was Major Daniel Merritt Mead (pictured in this section). Major Mead lead the first contingent of Greenwich volunteers into the Union ranks; approximately fifty five young men, averaging 21 years in age. In the ranks of Company I were twelve pairs of brothers, three pairs of brothers-in-law as well as three pairs of father and son serving together.

The 10th regiment saw action in the coastal campaign during the early years of the war, which culminated with the siege of Charleston. The 10th went on to fight the trench battles of Richmond, earning praise from Union generals and Ulysses S. Grant. The 10th regiment was active at the war's very end, when they blocked Robert E. Lee's attempt to escape from Virginia. And, the 10th was present at Appomattox Court House when Lee surrendered to Grant. By the war's end, the 10th regiment had fought in twenty-three battles and at least as many bloody skirmishes.

10th Connecticut Volunteers, summary of major engagements:

- Roanoke Island, NC, (February 1862),
- New Bern, NC, (March 1862),
- Siege of Charleston, S.C., (July 28 – October 25, 1863),
- Drewry's Bluff, VA, (May 1864),
- Darbytown and New Market Roads, VA, (October 1864),
- Fort Gregg, VA, (April 1865),
- Appomattox Court House, VA, (April 1865)

17th Connecticut Volunteers

The 17th regiment consisted of Fairfield county men and Company I was made up entirely of Greenwich recruits. The 17th regiment's first assignment was as reserve troops in the Fredericksburg campaign. The regiment subsequently saw action at Chancellorsville and Gettysburg. In the late summer of 1863, the 17th was ordered to Morris Island to support the siege of Charleston. The 17th fought in the siege works fronting Fort Wagner, Charleston's strongest defensive fortification. The 17th finished its military service in Florida, with major engagements at Welaka and Saudners and at Dunn's Lake.

== Greenwich African American Soldiers ==
African Americans from Greenwich fought in two Connecticut regiments, the 29th and 31st volunteer infantry. Both of these regiments were formed in the last 18 months of the war to meet the Union's aggressive drive for new recruits. Twenty four African Americans from Greenwich served in the 29th regiment. Twelve Greenwich African Americans also served in the 31st regiment.

== Notable Greenwich Soldiers ==
Nicholas Fox - Nicholas Fox was the only civil war soldier from Greenwich to receive the Medal of Honor, the highest battlefield recognition. Mr. Fox was awarded the Medal of Honor for an act of bravery in the battle of Fort Hudson, Louisiana, on June 14, 1863. In the battle, Nicolas Fox ran a deadly gauntlet of enemy fire to bring water to wounded Union soldiers, suffering from intense dehydration. He fought with Company H, the Greenwich unit of the 28th Connecticut Volunteers. At the time of his death, Nicholas Fox was one of only 31 Connecticut soldiers to ever receive the Medal of Honor.

Captain Frank Munford Kelly - In 1861, at the age of seventeen, Mr. Kelly enlisted in the 44th New York Volunteer Infantry Regiment, known as the Ellsworth Avengers. Through his valor he was soon promoted to Sergeant, then Second Lieutenant, Adjunct and, finally, captain. He participated in most of the important engagements of the Civil War, including the battles of Gettysburg, Fredericksburg, Vicksburg, Antietam and Bull Run. During the course of the war, Captain Kelly was aide de camp to Generals Grant, Meade and Ingalls and was an intimate friend of General Custer.

Charles A. Bing - Charles Bing enlisted in 1861 with the 6th Connecticut Volunteers, and spent twenty-seven months as a private in the service of the Union Army. In October 1861, Mr. Bing took part in one of the major initial Union coastal expeditions against the Confederacy. The expedition was composed of sixteen thousand Union soldiers as well as seventy-seven naval vessels and it succeeded in raising the Union flag at Port Royal, in South Carolina. At the time, this was the largest battle fleet ever assembled by the United States.

== Greenwich Civil War Record and Monument ==
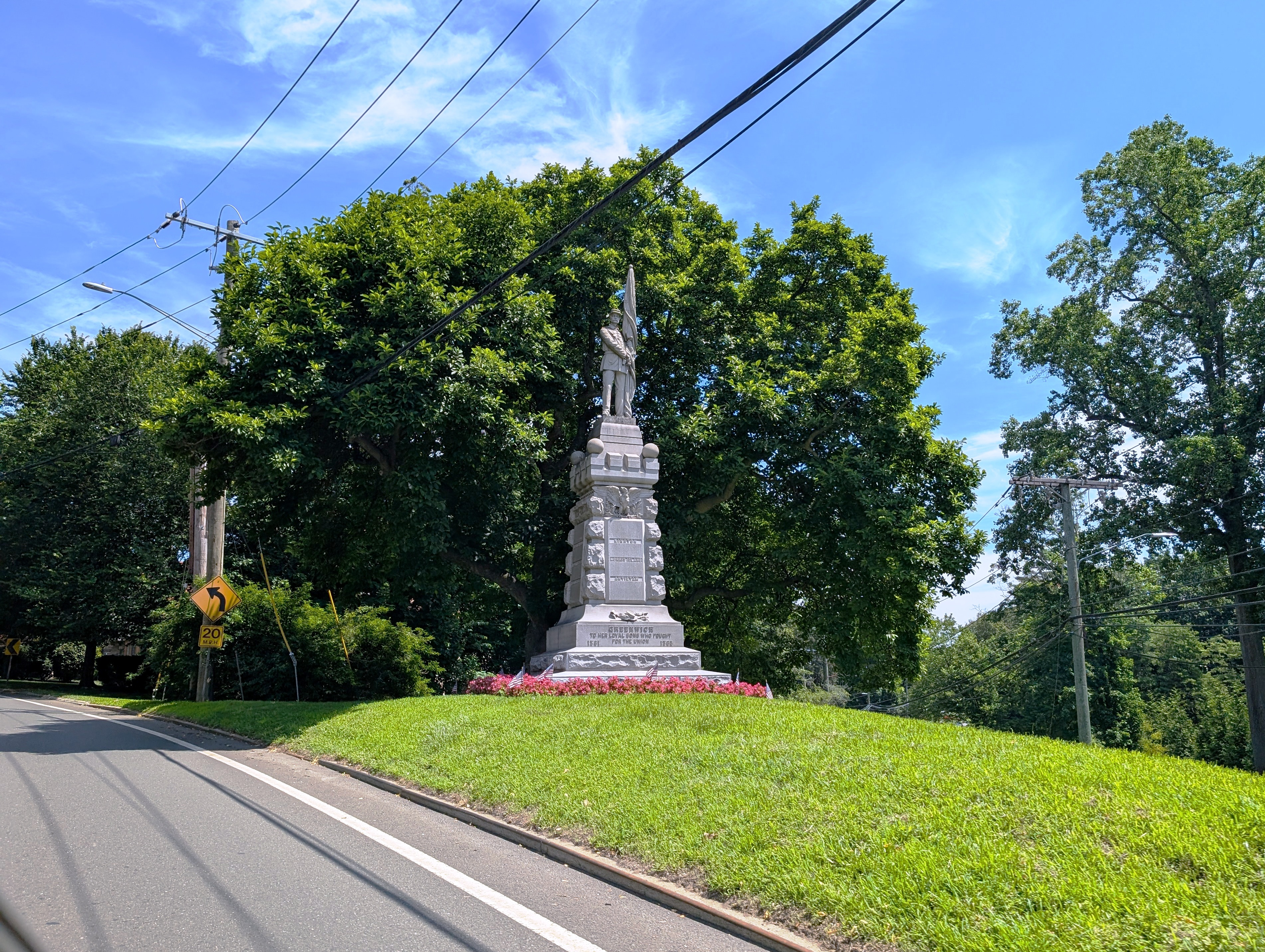
Greenwich Civil War Memorial

The town of Greenwich contributed a total 437 men to twenty-six Connecticut regiments during the Civil War. This represented approximately seven percent of the town's population. Sixty-nine Greenwich men gave their live for the Union cause during the civil war. Nine were killed in battle or died of wounds. Two were missing in action. Another fifty-eight perished, mostly from disease. And, forty-four were captured.

In 1890, the town of Greenwich erected a monument to their Civil War soldiers called the Soldiers' and Sailors' Monument. The dedication ceremony took place on October 22, 1890, with notable attendees including Governor Morgan M. Buckley, Lieutenant Governor Samuel E. Merwin, both United States senators from Connecticut, and many state legislators. The monument cost $6250 to construct, and was carved from Rhode Island granite by the firm of Lazzari and Barton. It still stands today at the corner of Putnam Avenue and Maple Street. On its sides are inscribed the names of battles in which Greenwich men fought. The monument bears the inscription:

"GREENWICH

TO HER LOYAL SONS WHO FOUGHT

1861 FOR THE UNION 1865"

Today, many street names in Greenwich also serve as reminders of Greenwich's Civil War soldiers, including Mead Avenue, Lockwood Road, Reynolds Place, Husted Lane, Mills Road, Ferris Drive, Peck Avenue and Scott Road.
