= Battle of Darbytown and New Market Roads order of battle: Confederate =

The following Confederate States Army units and commanders fought in the Battle of Darbytown and New Market Roads on October 7, 1864. The Union order of battle is listed separately.

== Abbreviations used ==
=== Military rank ===
- Gen = General
- LTG = Lieutenant General
- MG = Major General
- BG = Brigadier General
- Col = Colonel

=== Other ===
- (w) = wounded
- (mw) = mortally wounded
- (k) = killed in action
- (c) = captured

== Army of Northern Virginia ==
=== First Corps ===
LTG James Longstreet

Division	Brigade	Regiments and Others
Field's Division; MG Charles W. Field	Anderson's Brigade BG George T. Anderson	7th Georgia Infantry; 8th Georgia Infantry; 9th Georgia Infantry; 11th Georgia Infantry; 59th Georgia Infantry
Field's Division; MG Charles W. Field	Law's Brigade Col. William F. Perry	4th Alabama Infantry; 15th Alabama Infantry; 44th Alabama Infantry; 47th Alabama Infantry; 48th Alabama Infantry
Field's Division; MG Charles W. Field	Gregg's Brigade BG John Gregg (k); Col F.S. Bass	3rd Arkansas Infantry; 1st Texas Infantry; 4th Texas Infantry; 5th Texas Infantry
Field's Division; MG Charles W. Field	Benning's Brigade BG Henry L. Benning	2nd Georgia Infantry; 15th Georgia Infantry; 17th Georgia Infantry; 20th Georgia Infantry
Field's Division; MG Charles W. Field	Bratton's Brigade BG John Bratton	1st South Carolina Infantry; 5th South Carolina Infantry; 6th South Carolina Infantry; 2nd South Carolina Rifles
Artillery; BG Edward Porter Alexander	Cabell's Battalion Col H.C. Cabell	Anderson's (Virginia) Battery; Callaway's (Georgia) Battery; Carlton's (Georgia) Battery; Manly's (North Carolina) Battery
Artillery; BG Edward Porter Alexander	Huger's Battalion Ltc Frank Huger	Fickling's (South Carolina) Battery; Moody's (Louisiana) Battery; Parker's (Virginia) Battery; Smith's (Virginia) Battery; Taylor's (Virginia) Battery; Woolfolk's (Virginia) Battery
Artillery; BG Edward Porter Alexander	Hardaway's Battalion Ltc R.A. Hardaway	Dance's (Virginia) Battery; Graham's (Virginia) Battery; Griffin's (Virginia) Battery; Smith's (Virginia) Battery
Artillery; BG Edward Porter Alexander	Haskell's Battalion Maj John C. Haskell	Flanner's (North Carolina) Battery; Ramsay's (North Carolina) Battery; Garder's (South Carolina) Battery; Lankin's (Virginia) Battery
Artillery; BG Edward Porter Alexander	Stark's Battalion Ltc A. W. Stark	Green's (Louisiana) Battery; Armistead's (Virginia) Battery; French's (Virginia) Battery

=== Fourth Corps ===
LTG Richard H. Anderson

Division	Brigade	Regiments and Others
Hoke's Division; MG Robert F. Hoke	Hagood's Brigade BG Johnson Hagood	11th South Carolina Infantry; 21st South Carolina Infantry; 25th South Carolina Infantry; 27th South Carolina Infantry; 7th South Carolina Infantry Battalion
Hoke's Division; MG Robert F. Hoke	Colquitt's Brigade BG A.H. Colquitt	6th Georgia Infantry; 19th Georgia Infantry; 23rd Georgia Infantry; 27th Georgia Infantry; 28th Georgia Infantry
Hoke's Division; MG Robert F. Hoke	Clingman's Brigade BG Thomas L. Clingman	8th North Carolina Infantry; 31st North Carolina Infantry; 51st North Carolina Infantry; 61st North Carolina Infantry
Hoke's Division; MG Robert F. Hoke	Kirkland's Brigade BG W.W. Kirkland	17th North Carolina Infantry; 42nd North Carolina Infantry; 66th North Carolina Infantry
Artillery; Col H.P. Jones	Mosley's Battalion Ltc E.T. Mosley	Slaten's (Georgia) Battery; Cumming's (North Carolina) Battery; Miller's (Virginia) Battery; Young's (Virginia) Battery
Artillery; Col H.P. Jones	Blount's Battalion Maj G. Blount	Dickerson's (Virginia) Battery; Marshall's (Virginia) Battery; Macon's (Virginia) Battery; Sullivan's (Virginia) Battery
Artillery; Col H.P. Jones	Cort's Battalion Maj James C. Cort	Wright's (Louisiana) Battery; Bradford's (Mississippi) Battery; Pegram's (Virginia) Battery
Artillery; Col H.P. Jones	Martin's Battalion Cpt S. Taylor Martin	Martin's (Virginia) Battery; Sturdivant's (Virginia) Battery

=== Cavalry Corps ===
LTG Wade Hampton

Division	Brigade	Regiments and Others
W.H.F. Lee's Division; MG W.H.F. Lee	Barringer's Brigade BG Rufus Barringer	1st North Carolina Cavalry; 2nd North Carolina Cavalry; 3rd North Carolina Cavalry; 5th North Carolina Cavalry
W.H.F. Lee's Division; MG W.H.F. Lee	Beale's Brigade BG Richard L.T. Beale	9th Virginia Cavalry; 10th Virginia Cavalry; 13th Virginia Cavalry
W.H.F. Lee's Division; MG W.H.F. Lee	Dearing's Brigade BG James Dearing	8th Georgia Cavalry; 4th North Carolina Cavalry; 16th North Carolina Cavalry
Butler's Division; MG Matthew C. Butler	Butler's Brigade Col H.K. Aiken	4th South Carolina Cavalry; 5th South Carolina Cavalry; 6th South Carolina Cavalry
Butler's Division; MG Matthew C. Butler	Young's Brigade Col J.F. Waring	10th Georgia Cavalry; Cobb's (Georgia) Legion; Phillip's (Georgia) Legion; Jeff. Davis (Mississippi) Legion
Horse Artillery Maj R. Preston Chew	Hart's (South Carolina) Battery; Graham's (Virginia) Battery; McGregor's (Virginia) Battery	
