= Alvin C. Voris =

American politician and Union colonel

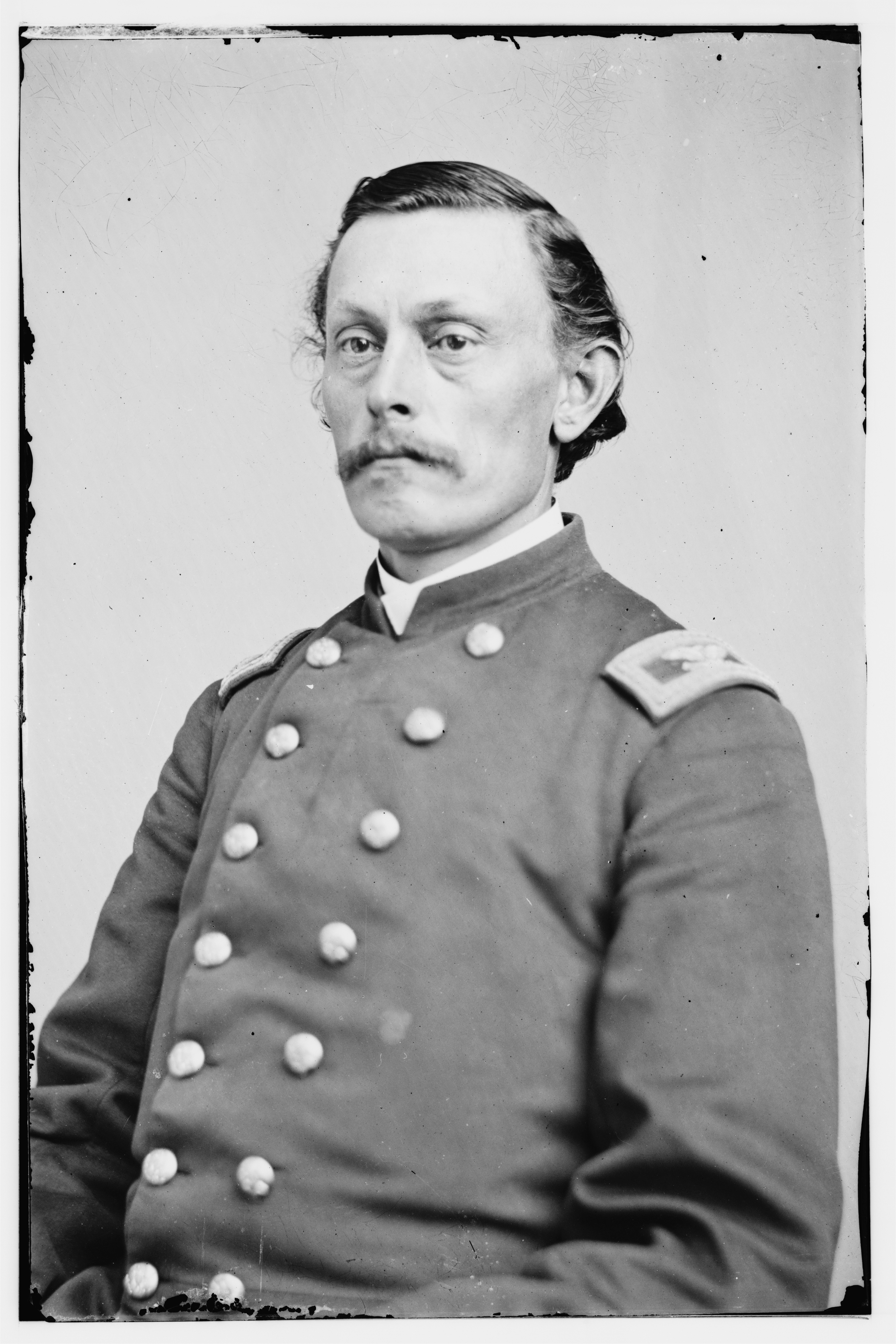
- Portrait of Voris

Member of the Ohio House of Representatives from the Summit County district
- In office 1859–1860

Personal details
- Born: Alvin Coe Voris; April 27, 1827 Stark County, Ohio, U.S.
- Died: July 27, 1904 (aged 77) Akron, Ohio, U.S.
- Resting place: Glendale Cemetery; Akron, Ohio, U.S.
- Spouse(s): Lydia Allyn (m. 1853; died 1876) Lizzie H. Keller (m. 1882)
- Children: 3
- Education: Twinsburg Institute; Oberlin College
- Occupation: Politician; judge; military officer
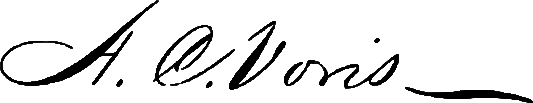
- Signature

Alvin Coe Voris (April 27, 1827 – July 27, 1904) was an American politician, judge and military officer from Ohio. He served as colonel of the 67th Ohio Infantry Regiment and was brevetted major general in 1865. He served in the Ohio House of Representatives, representing Summit County.

== Early life ==
Alvin Coe Voris was born on April 27, 1827, in Stark County, Ohio, as the first child of Peter Voris. His father was a judge. The family moved to Summit County and lived in Bath Township. He attended public schools. He attend Twinsburg Institute for one year and took an elective course at Oberlin College for two years.

== Career ==
Voris worked at a teaching school and was a shoes salesman. In February 1850, he moved to Akron. He was shortly afterward appointed as deputy probate clerk and served in that role for two years. He was acting probate judge of Summit County from 1851 to 1852. He studied law under Lucius V. Bierce and was admitted to practice law on June 20, 1853. He then practiced law with Bierce. He was elected to the Ohio House of Representatives and served two terms, from 1859 to 1860.

Voris enlisted as a private with the 29th Ohio Infantry Regiment. Prior to the regiment organizing, Governor William Dennison Jr. tendered him the rank of second lieutenant and he recruited for another regiment. His recruits were ultimately consolidated a few months later into the 67th Ohio Infantry Regiment and he was commissioned as lieutenant colonel of the regiment. He was later promoted to colonel.

Voris served and was slightly wounded in the right thigh at the First Battle of Kernstown during the 1862 Valley Campaign. He was wounded again at an assault on Fort Wagner in December 1862. He returned home to recuperate and 60 days later re-enlisted. In 1863, he captured Confederate General William Stephen Walker and kept Walker's sword as a prize. In 1865, Voris and the 67th helped capture Fort Gregg. He defeated Robert Ransom at the Battle of Chester Station. He was brevetted brigadier general in 1864. In 1865, he was brevetted major general. Following the war, he was assigned garrison duty near Richmond, Virginia, and he was given military command of a district of South Anna in southern Virginia. He was mustered out of service in December 1865.

Voris returned home to Akron and practiced law until 1890. He served as a delegate to the Ohio constitutional convention in 1873. He advocated for "impartial suffrage" and was an advocate for black and women rights. On November 4, 1890, he was elected as a Republican to a five-year term as common pleas judge of the judicial district of Summit, Medina, and Lorain counties. He was defeated for renomination. He was nominated by an independent ticket and endorsed by the Democratic Party, but lost. He then continued to practice law until he retired.

== Personal life ==
In 1873, Voris had a surgical operation for a rifle bullet from the Civil War that was still in an abdominal organ. He was a member of local Masonic bodies.

Voris married Lydia Allyn in 1853. They had three children, Edwin Francis, Lucy Allyn, and Bessie Coe. His wife died in 1876. He married Lizzie H. Keller in 1882. He lived in Akron for 60 years. His daughter Bessie married Akron mayor William T. Sawyer.

Voris died on July 27, 1904, at his home on Fir Street in Akron. He was buried in Glendale Cemetery in Akron.

== See also ==
- List of American Civil War brevet generals
