= 10th Connecticut Infantry Regiment =

- Active: September 1861 – August 1865
- Disbanded: August 25, 1865
- Country: United States
- Allegiance: Union
- Branch: United States Army
- Type: Infantry
- Size: 1,728
- Engagements: Battle of Roanoke Island; Battle of New Bern; Battle of Kinston; Battle of Goldsborough Bridge; Battle of Fort Wagner; Battle of Drewry's Bluff; Second Battle of Deep Bottom; Siege of Petersburg

The 10th Connecticut Infantry Regiment was one of Connecticut's most successful American Civil War regiments, compiling an exemplary record of service in the Union Army. The 10th Connecticut Infantry Regiment saw action in the coastal campaign during the early years of the war, which culminated with the siege of Charleston. They went on to fight the trench battles of Richmond, earning praise from Union generals and Ulysses S. Grant. They were active at the war's very end, when they blocked Robert E. Lee's attempt to escape from Virginia. They were also present at Appomattox Court House when Lee surrendered to Grant. All told, the 10th Connecticut Infantry Regiment fought in twenty three battles and at least as many skirmishes.

== Formation of the Regiment ==
The 10th Connecticut Infantry Regiment was originally formed from the 10th Connecticut Volunteers. After the Union loss at the first Battle of Bull Run, in the summer of 1861, volunteers poured into the Union army ranks. In September, members of the 10th regiment started arriving at Camp Buckingham in Hartford. Members of the 10th regiment came from Connecticut towns large and small, including, Hartford, New Haven, Derby, Manchester, Sprague, New London, Stamford and Greenwich. After a few months at Camp Buckingham, the 10th regiment headed down to Annapolis, M.D. for additional training before joining General Burnside's North Carolina Expedition to blockade vital Confederate ports.

== Commanders ==
Major Edwin S. Greely

== Combat record ==
=== Battle of Roanoke Island (February 1862) ===
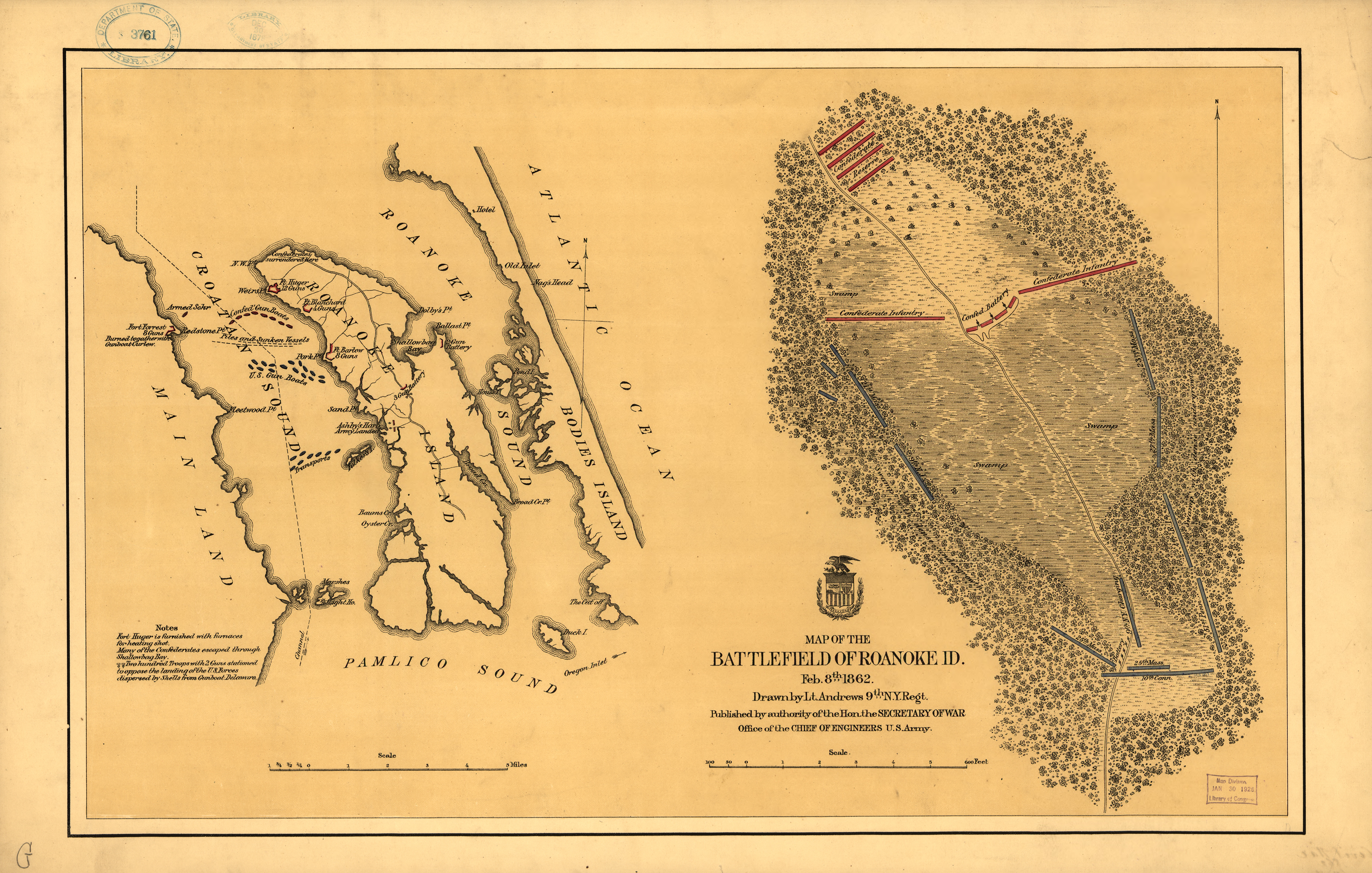
Map of Roanoke Island, showing forts and fleet dispositions, February 7, 1862, on the left, and on the right, the battlefield where opposing armies met on February 8. Prepared by Lt. Andrews, 9th N.Y. Regiment.

One of the first objectives for Burnside's expeditionary force was to capture Roanoke Island in North Carolina. After a harrowing sea voyage through a violent storm, during which hundreds of Connecticut soldiers perished due to illness, the Tenth was put ashore on the North Carolina coast.

The two-day battle for Roanoke Island started with Union gunboats bombarding the Confederate positions. The Tenth faced a daunting task trying to dislodge the 3,000 enemy defenders. Captain Pardee of the Tenth wrote, "They had three pieces of artillery fronting and commanding this clearing; and large numbers of riflemen perched in trees, behind the turfed walls and under all possible covers."

The Tenth along with the other Connecticut units made a determined advance and completely routed the Confederates. After the victory, the Tenth was recognized for their bravery and excellent soldierly actions by commanding General John G. Foster. The Tenth also won praise from their comrades in the 8th Connecticut Volunteers, being written about as "the gallant Connecticut Tenth".

The Tenth sustained the heaviest losses in the Battle of Roanoke Island in North Carolina by any regiment engaged, with 56 soldiers killed or wounded.

=== Battle of Newbern (March 1862) ===
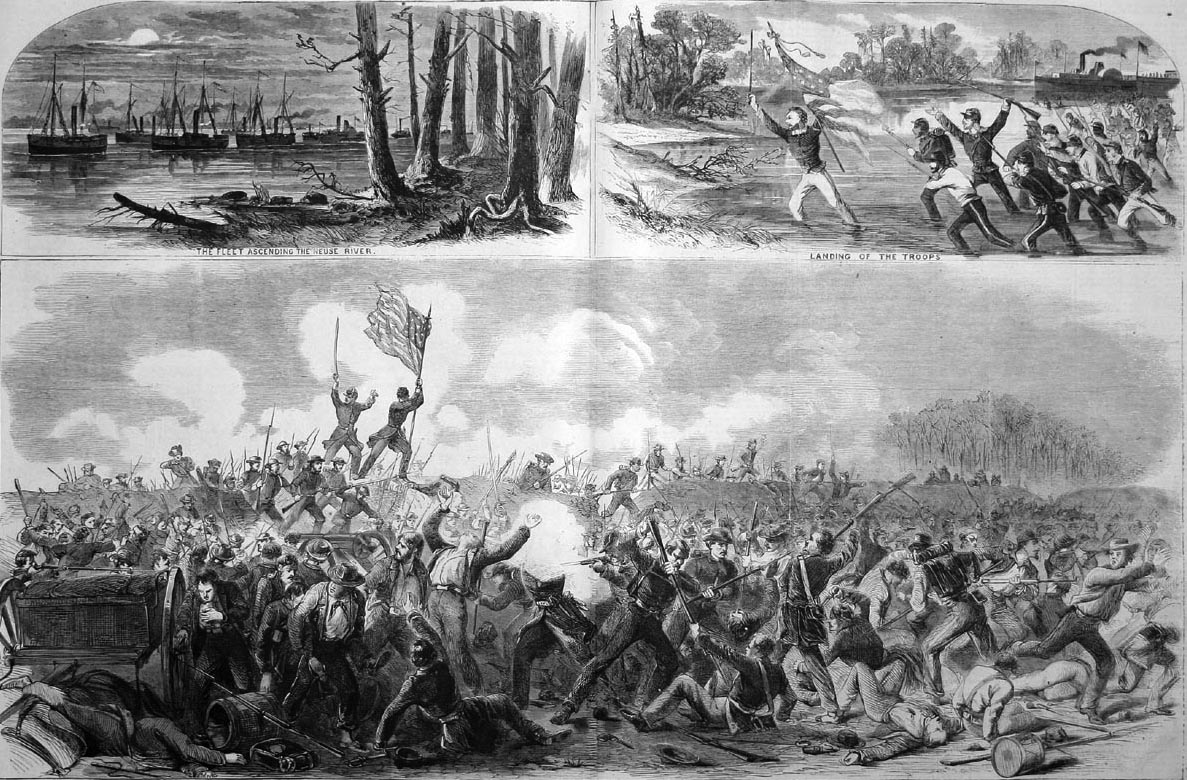
Battle of New Bern as illustrated in Harper's Weekly. 5 April 1862

After taking Roanoke Island, the next Union objective was to move up the Neuse River and attack a Confederate position at Newbern, North Carolina, a strategic coastal town, west of the Outer Banks.

On the morning of March 13, General Burnside ordered the entire brigade to advance on the Confederate position. The Confederates had established a long line of impressive defensive fortifications manned by 7,000 soldiers and a large number of heavy artillery.

Here, a heavy and sustained rifle fire from the Tenth Connecticut weakened parts of the Confederate line. This allowed the 8th Connecticut and 4th Rhode Island troops to charge and begin the rout of the enemy forces. Newbern was soon under Union control.

In his report, General Foster praised the men of the Tenth, writing, "...(the Tenth) advanced..., in line of battle, fired with the most remarkable steadiness,..., giving and taking the most severe fire."

=== Action at Rawls Mills (November 1862) ===
The Tenth remained in Newbern all throughout the summer of 1862. The next action for the Tenth came in November 1862, when the regiment was ordered to attack a rebel supply route near Rawls Mills, N.C. The Tenth was out in front of the Union troops, the first to take fire in leading the advance. Rebel troops were pushed back repeatedly as the Union troops marched through Williamston and continued on to capture Rainbow Fort on the Roanoke River. Two weeks later, the Tenth was back in Newbern having accomplished their mission.

=== Battle at Kinston (December 1862) ===
In December 1862, the Tenth moved out of Newbern to support General McClellan's attack on the Confederate capital of Richmond and to cut off the Wilmington Railroad. The first encounter with the Confederate forces was near the Kinston Bridge over the Neuse River.

The advance of the first two lines of Union troops was halted by the Confederate resistance and swamp terrain. Here, General Foster called on the Tenth to make a breakthrough. The Tenth pressed the attack through a hailstorm of bullets. They charged the Confederate positions, and, after half an hour of murderous, close-range, rifle-exchanges, the Tenth gained the upper hand.

The Confederate lines collapsed. As they retreated, the Confederate troops set fire to the strategic Kinston bridge. Undeterred, the Tenth managed to douse the flames, capture the bridge and drive off the enemy forces. In this battle, the Tenth captured 100 Confederate soldiers and all of the Confederate artillery.

This had been the most difficult fighting that the Tenth had experienced, thus far. The losses were large, both in officers and enlisted ranks. Of the three hundred and sixty officers and men sent into action, over a third were killed in action or died within four days of the battle. General Foster again hailed the Tenth as the "bravest among the brave".

=== Battle of Goldsborough Bridge (December 1862) ===
The Tenth was given no time to rest. The regiment moved on toward the town of Goldsborough, North Carolina Again the Tenth was at the front of the Union force. At Goldsborough the regiment destroyed Confederate railroad tracks and a burned a railroad bridge. With the mission accomplished, the Tenth returned to Newbern, having absorbed one fourth of all Union losses in this expedition.

=== Assault on Fort Wagner (July 1863) ===
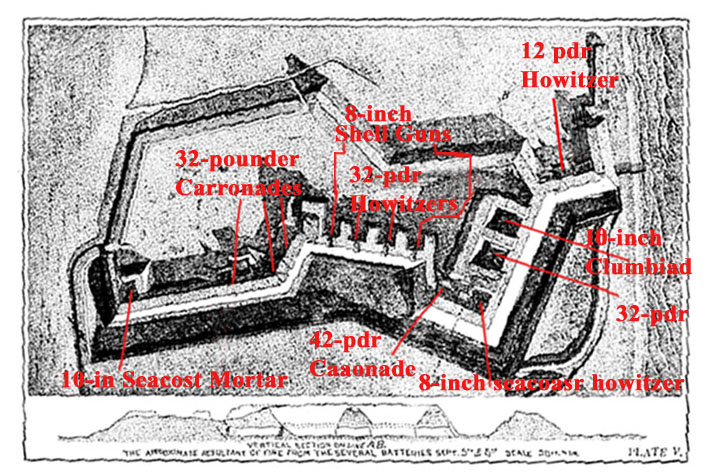
Plan of Fort Wagner, with overlay showing armament

During 1862, despite the Union Army advances along the Carolina coast, the Confederacy had largely succeeded in defending its territory, beating back the stronger Union forces with superior battlefield leadership. At the beginning of 1863, the Union Army was still in search of a major, morale-boosting victory.

The Tenth finally moved out of Newbern, North Carolina, in January 1863. The regiment was ordered to St. Helena Island, South Carolina, near Charleston. The Union blockade of Charleston harbor was effective, but the city remained in Confederate hands.

In early July, the Tenth was ordered to join a large-scale assault on Fort Wagner, situated on nearby Morris Island.This was part of the second Union attempt to capture Charleston. The Tenth's main role in the assault was a successful diversionary action. The main attack force consisted of the African American troops of the 54th Massachusetts and the 6th Connecticut (as depicted in the motion picture Glory).

The attack on Fort Wagner did not initially succeed, although Union forces did breach the fort's defenses. After the attack, Union soldiers spent months digging trenches parallel to the Confederate lines. This tactic eventually proved a successful strategy as the Confederate troops abandoned Fort Wagner in early September.

=== Down the Atlantic coast to St. Augustine, Florida ===
In late October 1863, the Tenth was ordered down the Atlantic coast for rest and recuperation in St. Augustine, Florida. The men of the Tenth were able to regain their strength at St. Augustine, but the enemy was always nearby. In fact, twenty two soldiers of the regiment were captured and one soldier was killed during a Confederate ambush. The men of the 10th were escorting a wood chopping detail near the base when the Confederates attacked.

=== On the James River, City Point and Bermuda Hundred (May 1864) ===
As 1864 began, the Union Armies of the Potomac and the James were methodically pushing General Lee's Army to the strong defenses of the Confederate capital of Richmond.

During February 1864, Connecticut veterans of the war were given furloughs. Veterans of the Tenth arrived in New Haven on February 19 and then travelled to Hartford. They were warmly received and praised by town and state leaders. Veterans of the Tenth re-enlisted for another three years and new recruits joined the regiment.

In May 1864, men of the Tenth Connecticut were back on the front line. The regiment was assigned to the Tenth Corps in the Army of the James. Their first mission was to take the strategic riverfronts at City Point and Bermuda Hundred in Virginia. The 10th regiment and accompanying Union troops accomplished this mission by moving quickly up the James River, surprising the Confederate forces, and landing unopposed.

City Point, situated on the confluence of the James and Appomattox Rivers, would later become General Grant's main headquarters and the Union's staging area for the siege of Petersburg and Richmond.

=== Battle of Fort Darling (Drewry's Bluff) (May 1864) ===
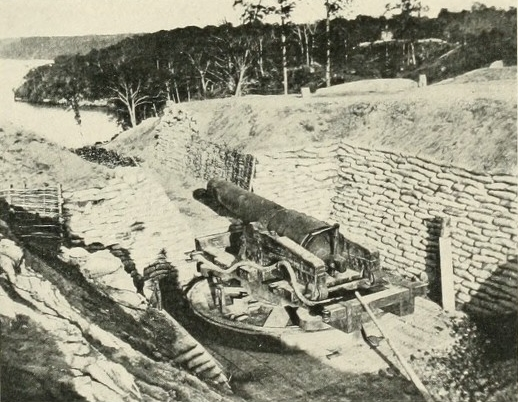
Confederate gun at Battery Dantzler, Drewry's Bluff.

The next objective of the Union force was a march toward Richmond to encircle the Confederate capital. In their path stood Fort Darling, a strong defensive position on the James River, near Drewry's Bluff and just south of Richmond.

The assault on Fort Darling did not succeed. However, the Tenth fought bravely, mainly in rearguard action, protecting other Union regiments. Despite this setback, Union troops continued on toward Richmond.

=== Repelling an attack on the march to Richmond ===
In early October, the advancing Union army was suddenly counterattacked by Confederate cavalry and infantry units. The Tenth fended off the attack despite fighting with an exposed flank, as an adjacent New York regiment turned and ran when the Confederates charged.

General H.M. Plaisted, commander of the Tenth Army Corps, wrote of the Tenth Connecticut, "In my opinion, the conduct of the Tenth Regiment, when the troops on its right broke and fled, saved the Army of the James."

=== Battle for Fort Gregg (April 1865) ===
By early April 1865, Union forces were at the outer defenses of Petersburg. The Tenth was now poised to attack Fort Gregg, an intimidating defensive position, consisting of well constructed trenches and earthworks, backed up by many artillery pieces. On April 2 the Tenth, supported by the 100th New York Infantry, advanced toward Fort Gregg, facing murderous cannon and rifle fire. Many of the Tenth fell far short of their objective. But, the main body of the regiment reached the fort, and there began fierce hand-to-hand combat. The Connecticut flag was first to be placed on the parapet of the fort, and after the brutal struggle, the Tenth Connecticut emerged victorious. Victory came at a high cost; half of the Tenth's assault force were either killed or wounded. After the battle, Major General John Gibbon, presented to the Tenth Connecticut, an ornate bronze eagle, resting on a globe to place atop the Connecticut state flag. This distinction went to the men of the Tenth for "...for gallant conduct in the assault on Fort Gregg...".

=== Appomattox Court House (April 1865) ===
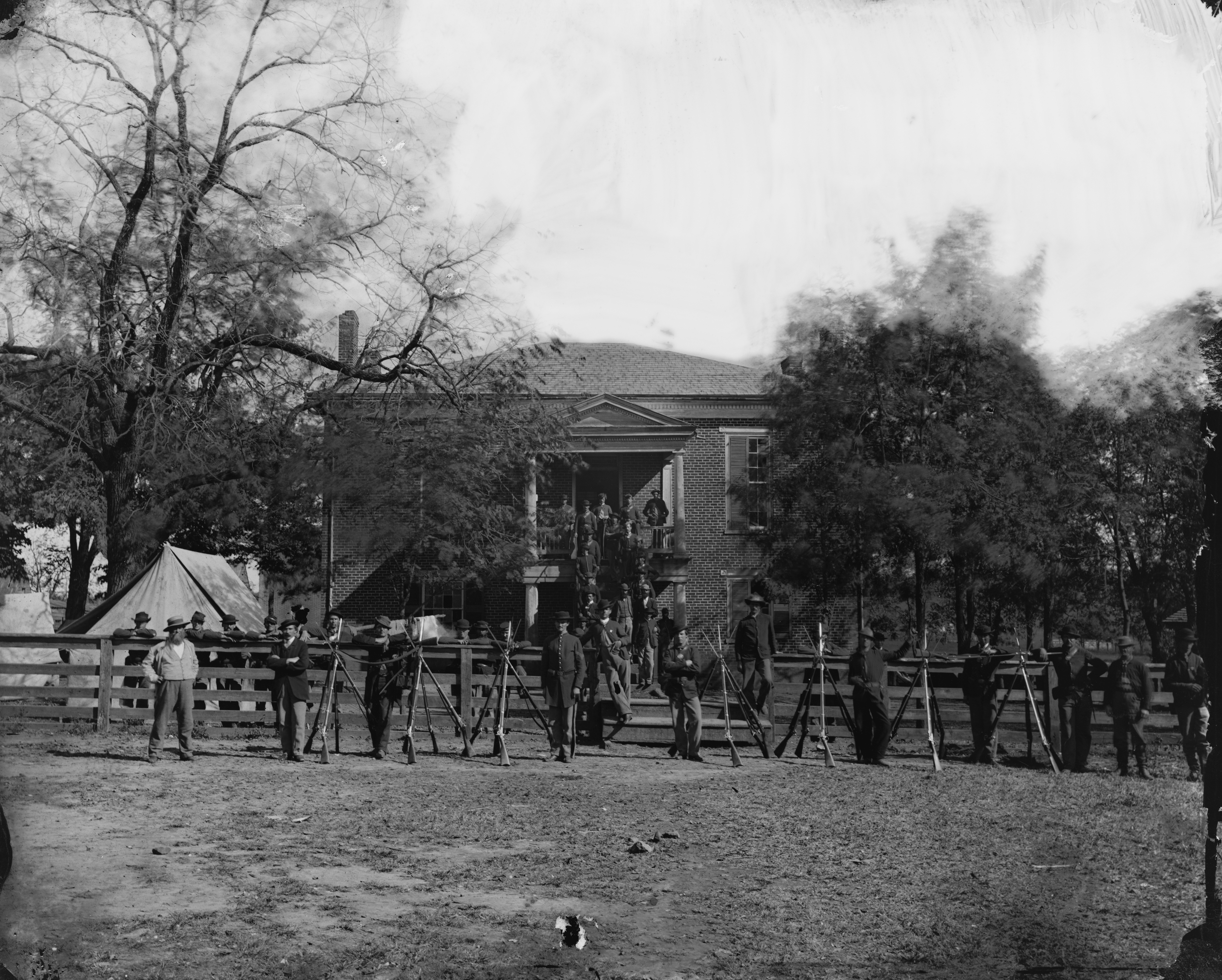
Federal soldiers at the courthouse, April 1865

The men of the Tenth were pressed into action once again in pursuit of the retreating Robert E. Lee. Lee withdrew from Richmond to Danville, Virginia and looked to link up with General Johnston's army in North Carolina. At dawn, on April 9, Lee tried to break through Union lines near Appomattox Station, 100 miles west of Richmond. After an initial surge forward by the Confederate troops, the Tenth and First Connecticut Cavalry blocked Lee's escape. The war lost, Lee signed the surrender of the Army of Northern Virginia, just hours later, at Appomattox Court House. The 10th Connecticut was present.

== Record and legacy ==
The Tenth Connecticut was mustered out of the Union Army on August 25, 1865. During the four-year war, the Tenth Connecticut saw service from 2,124 men. These men fought in 23 battles and at least as many skirmishes. Fifty seven men were killed in action. Fifty nine died of wounds and one hundred fifty two died of disease. The Tenth was one of the top 300 Union regiments in the Civil War (out of over 1,700), according to historian William F. Fox.

== See also ==
- Category:People of Connecticut in the American Civil War
- Connecticut in the American Civil War
- List of Connecticut Civil War units
- Greenwich in the American Civil War
