= 7th New Hampshire Infantry Regiment =

Infantry regiment of the Union Army in the Civil War

- Active: December 13, 1861 – July 17, 1865
- Country: United States of America
- Allegiance: Union
- Branch: United States Army; Union Army
- Type: Infantry
- Size: 1,718
- Engagements: American Civil War: Second Battle of Fort Wagner; Olustee; Battle of Drewry's Bluff; Siege of Petersburg

Commanders
- Notable commanders: Col. Haldimand S. Putnam †; Col. Joseph Carter Abbott

The 7th New Hampshire Infantry Regiment was an infantry regiment of the Union Army during the American Civil War. It was raised in the state of New Hampshire, serving from December 13, 1861, to July 17, 1865. Because it was in the same brigade as the 7th Connecticut Infantry Regiment, both regiments together were often jointly called the 77th New England.

== Commanders ==
Lieut. Colonel J.C. Abbott

== Service history ==
On December 13, 1861, the regiment was organized and mustered in at Manchester, New Hampshire.

On January 14, 1862, the 7th moved to New York City. Until February 13 at White Street Barracks. Orders for Dry Tortugas, Florida, on February 12. Attached to Brannan's Command, District of Florida until June 1862.

The unit arrived Fort Jefferson, Florida in March 1862, under the command of Col. Haldimand S. Putnam.

From then, its assignments were:

- St. Augustine, Fla., Dept. of the South, to May, 1863.
- Fernandina, Fla., Dept. of the South, to June, 1863.
- 1st Brigade, Folly Island, S.C., 10th Corps, Dept. of the South, to July, 1863.
- 1st Brigade, 2nd Division, Morris Island, S.C., 10th Corps, Dept. of the South, to July, 1863.
- 3rd Brigade, Morris Island, S. C., 10th Corps, Dept. of the South, to November, 1863.
- 1st Brigade, Morris Island, S.C., 10th Corps, Dept. of the South, to December, 1863.
- St. Helena Island, S. C., 10th Corps, Dept. of the South, to February, 1864.
- Hawley's Brigade, Ames' Division, District of Florida, Dept. of the South, to April, 1864.
- 3rd Brigade, 1st Division, 10th Army Corps, Dept. of Virginia and North Carolina, to May, 1864.
- 2nd Brigade, 1st Division, 10th Army Corps, Army of the James, to December, 1864.
- 2nd Brigade, 1st Division, 24th Army Corps, Army of the James, to January, 1865.
- Abbott's Brigade, Terry's Provisional Corps, North Carolina, to March, 1865.
- Abbott's Detached Brigade, 10th Army Corps, North Carolina, to July, 1865.

The regiment lost during its term of service 15 officers and 169 enlisted men killed and mortally wounded, and 1 officer and 241 enlisted men by disease, for a total of 426 fatalities.

== See also ==
- List of New Hampshire Civil War Units
