= John Kane (Medal of Honor) =

Union Army soldier

- Civil War era Army Medal of Honor
- Born: 1831 or 1832; Ireland
- Died: May 8, 1881; Clyde, New York, US
- Burial place: Saint John's Catholic Cemetery; Clyde, New York, US
- Military career
- Allegiance: United States of America
- Branch: United States Army; Union Army
- Service years: 1862 - 1865
- Rank: Sergeant
- Units: Company K, 100th New York Infantry
- Conflicts: assault on Fort Gregg
- Awards: Medal of Honor

John Kane was an American soldier who fought in the American Civil War. Kane received his country's highest award for bravery during combat, the Medal of Honor. Kane's medal was won for gallantry during the assault on Fort Gregg on April 2, 1865. He was honored with the award on May 12, 1865.

Kane was born in Ireland, and in August 1862 (at age 28) joined the US Army from Buffalo, New York. He mustered out with his regiment in June 1865.

== Medal of Honor citation ==
The President of the United States of America, in the name of Congress, takes pleasure in presenting the Medal of Honor to Corporal John Kane, United States Army, for extraordinary heroism on 2 April 1865, while serving with Company K, 100th New York Infantry, in action at Petersburg, Virginia, for gallantry as Color Bearer in the assault on Fort Gregg.

== See also ==
- List of American Civil War Medal of Honor recipients: G–L
