= Francis Bates Pond =

American politician

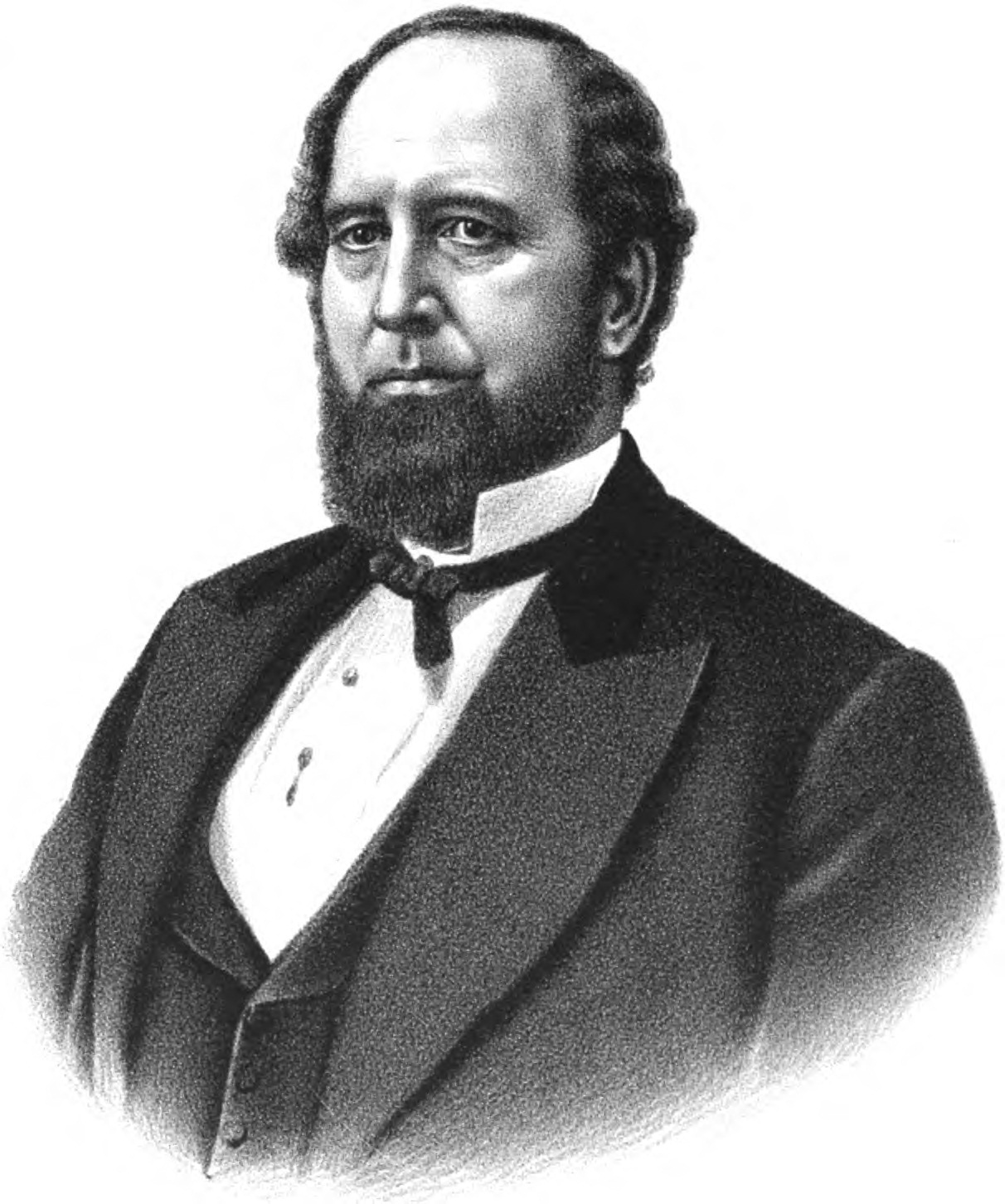

12th Ohio Attorney General
- In office January 1870 – January 1874
- Governor: Rutherford B. Hayes; Edward F. Noyes
- Preceded by: William H. West
- Succeeded by: John Little

Member of the Ohio House of Representatives from the Morgan County district
- In office January 6, 1868 – January 2, 1870
- Preceded by: Thomas I. Williams
- Succeeded by: Richard Stanton

Member of the Ohio Senate from the 14th district
- In office January 5, 1880 – November 2, 1883
- Preceded by: John Irvine
- Succeeded by: Gilbert Smith

Personal details
- Born: August 9, 1825 Ellisburg, New York, US
- Died: November 2, 1883 (aged 58) Malta, Ohio, US
- Resting place: Malta Cemetery
- Party: Republican
- Spouses: Eliza A Corner; Emma Corner; Janet Alecander
- Children: three
- Education: Oberlin College
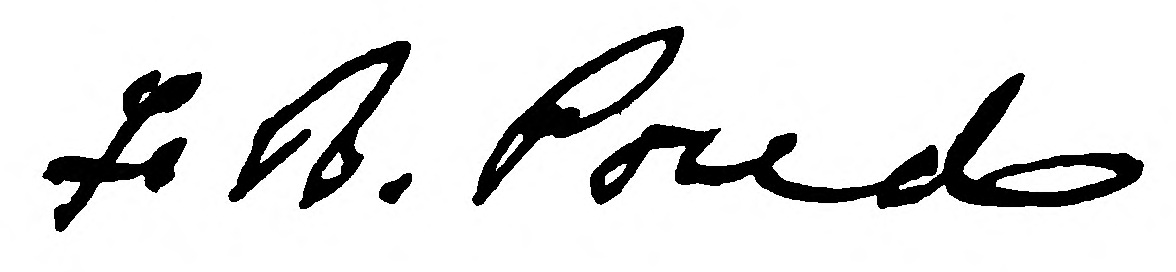
- Signature

Military service
- Allegiance: United States
- Branch/service: Union Army
- Years of service: 1861–1864
- Rank: Colonel
- Unit: 62nd Ohio Infantry

Francis Bates Pond was a Republican politician from the state of Ohio. He was Ohio Attorney General from 1870 to 1874.

Pond was born August 9, 1825, at Ellisburg, Jefferson County, New York. He entered Oberlin College in Oberlin, Ohio, in 1841, and graduated with honors in 1846. He spent the next three years in Kent, Ohio, one year as a teacher and two as a book-keeper for Charles and Marvin Kent. In 1850 he went to Harmar, Ohio and taught classics at the Harmar Academy. He began study of law in 1849 in Cleveland, and continued in Marietta in 1850. He was admitted to the bar 1852 at Malta, Ohio, and three years later elected Prosecuting Attorney of Morgan County, Ohio. During the Civil War, he served as a colonel with the Sixty-second Ohio Infantry, and August, 1864, at the Battle of Deep River, he was wounded, and lost sight in his left eye. He resigned in November of that year.

In 1867, he was elected to represent Morgan County in the Ohio House of Representatives for the Fifty-eighth General Assembly. In 1869 and 1871 he won election as Ohio Attorney General. In 1879 he was elected to the Ohio Senate from the Fourteenth district (Washington, Morgan and part of Noble County), for the Sixty-fourth General Assembly, and re-elected to the Sixty-fifth in 1881.

He died November 2, 1883, at his home in Malta, Ohio. He died as a result of the wound he received near his eye in the Civil War which he had suffered with for nineteen years.

Pond was married to Eliza A. Corner of Malta in 1854. She died on January 13, 1866. On May 21, 1867, he married his first wife's sister, Emma. She died March 18, 1870. He married Janet Alexander of Washington County, Pennsylvania in 1876. His first wife had children named Mary Blanche and George Charles. His second wife had a son named Francis Newell, who died in infancy.

== Notes ==
Political offices
Preceded by William H. West	Ohio Attorney General; January 10, 1870-January 12, 1874	Succeeded by John Little
Ohio House of Representatives
Preceded by Thomas L. Williams	Representative from Morgan County; January 6, 1868-January 2, 1870	Succeeded by Richard Stanton
Ohio Senate
Preceded by John Irvine	Senator from 14th District; January 5, 1880-November 2, 1883	Succeeded by Gilbert Smith
