= 100th New York Infantry Regiment =

- Active: January 1862 to August 28, 1865
- Country: United States
- Allegiance: Union
- Branch: Infantry
- Engagements: Siege of Yorktown; Battle of Williamsburg; Battle of Seven Pines; Seven Days Battles; Second Battle of Fort Wagner; Second Battle of Charleston Harbor; Bermuda Hundred Campaign; Siege of Petersburg; First Battle of Deep Bottom; Second Battle of Deep Bottom; Battle of Chaffin's Farm; Battle of Darbytown and New Market Roads; Battle of Fair Oaks & Darbytown Road; Battle of Fort Gregg; Appomattox Campaign; Battle of Appomattox Court House

The 100th New York Infantry Regiment was an infantry regiment in the Union Army during the American Civil War.

== Service ==
The 100th New York Infantry was organized at Buffalo, New York, and mustered in for three years service in January 1862 under the command of Colonel James M. Brown.

The regiment was attached to 1st Brigade, 3rd Division, IV Corps, Army of the Potomac, to June 1862. 1st Brigade, 2nd Division, IV Corps, to December 1862. Naglee's Brigade, Department of North Carolina, to January 1863. 2nd Brigade, 2nd Division, XVIII Corps, Department of North Carolina, to February 1863. 1st Brigade, 2nd Division, XVIII Corps, Department of the South, to April 1863. Folly Island, South Carolina, X Corps, Department of the South, to June 1863. 2nd Brigade, Folly Island, South Carolina, X Corps, to July 1863. 1st Brigade, Folly Island, South Carolina, X Corps, July 1863. 2nd Brigade, 1st Division, Morris Island, South Carolina, X Corps, July 1863. 3rd Brigade, Morris Island, South Carolina, X Corps, to November 1863. 2nd Brigade, Morris Island, South Carolina, X Corps, to January 1864. 2nd Brigade, Morris Island, South Carolina, Northern District, Department of the South, to April 1864. 2nd Brigade, 1st Division, X Corps, Army of the James, Department of Virginia and North Carolina, to May 1864. 3rd Brigade, 1st Division, X Corps, to December 1864. 3rd Brigade, 1st Division, XXIV Corps, to July 1865. 2nd Brigade, 1st Division, XXIV Corps, to August 1865.

The 100th New York Infantry mustered out of service on August 28, 1865.

== Detailed service ==
Moved to New York City March 7, then to Washington, D.C., March 10, 1862. Ordered to the Virginia Peninsula March 28, 1862. Siege of Yorktown, April 5-May 4. Battle of Williamsburg, May 5. Operations about Bottom's Bridge May 20–23. Reconnaissance to Seven Pines May 24–27. Battle of Seven Pines, May 31-June 1. Seven Days Battles before Richmond June 25-July 1. Bottom's Bridge June 27–29. White Oak Swamp June 30. Malvern Hill July 1. At Harrison's Landing until August 16. Moved to Fortress Monroe August 16–22, then to Yorktown, Va., September 18. Duty at Yorktown and Gloucester Point until December 26. Reconnaissance to Gloucester and Matthews Counties December 11–15. Skirmish at Wood's Cross Roads, Gloucester Court House, December 14. Moved to Beaufort, N.C., December 26, then to Port Royal, S.C., January 28–31. Camp at St. Helena Island, S.C., February 12-March 23. Capture of Forts Wagner and Gregg September 7. until April 3. Action at Cole's Island March 31. Occupation of Folly Island, S.C.. April 5-July 10. Action at Folly Island April 10. Attack on Morris Island July 10. Assaults on Fort Wagner, Morris Island, S.C., July 11 and 18. Siege of Forts Wagner and Gregg, and operations against Fort Sumter and Charleston, July 18-September 7. Boat Expedition against Fort Gregg August 17. Bombardment of Fort Sumter August 17–23. Capture of Forts Wagner and Gregg September 7. Duty on Morris Island and operations against Charleston until April 1864. Affair, Vincent's Creek, August 4, 1863. Moved to Gloucester Point. Va., April. Butler's operations on south side of the James River and against Petersburg and Richmond May 4–28. Occupation of Bermuda Hundred May 5. Port Walthall Junction, Chester Station, May 7. Swift Creek May 8–10. Operations against Fort Darling May 12–16. Battle of Drury's Bluff May 14–16. Bermuda Hundred May 16-June 20. Attacks on picket line May 21 and June 2 and 14. Port Walthall June 16–17. Siege operations against Petersburg and Richmond June 16, 1864, to April 2, 1865. Action at Deep Bottom June 23. Groper House, Deep Bottom, July 21. Deep Bottom July 27–28. Strawberry Plains, New Market Heights, August 14–18. Moved to Petersburg front August 26, and duty there in trenches until September 27. Battle of Chaffin's Farm September 28–30. Darbytown Road October 7. Reconnaissance to Darbytown Road October 13. Battle of Fair Oaks October 27–28. Johnson's Farm October 29. Duty in trenches before Richmond until March 1865. Appomattox Campaign March 28-April 9. On line of Hatcher's and Gravelly Runs March 29–30. Assault on Fort Gregg and fall of Petersburg April 2. Pursuit of Lee April 3–9. Rice's Station April 6. Appomattox Court House April 9. Surrender of Lee and his army. Duty in the Department of Virginia until August.

== Casualties ==
The regiment lost a total of 367 men during service; 12 officers and 182 enlisted men killed or mortally wounded, 1 officer and 202 enlisted men died of disease.

== Commanders ==
- Colonel James M. Brown
- Colonel George Dandy

== Notable members ==
- Sergeant John Kane, Company K - Medal of Honor recipient for action at during the attack on Fort Gregg

== See also ==
- List of New York Civil War regiments
- New York in the Civil War
