= Somerton, Ohio =

Unincorporated community in Ohio, U.S.

Coordinates: 39°54′04″N 81°08′12″W

Somerton is an unincorporated community in Belmont County, in the U.S. state of Ohio.

== History ==
Somerton was laid out around 1818. The community's name is derived from Somerset, England. A post office called Somerton was established in 1827.
