= Second Battle of Fort Wagner =

1863 battle of the American Civil War

Second Battle of Fort Wagner (Second Assault on Morris Island)
- Part of the American Civil War
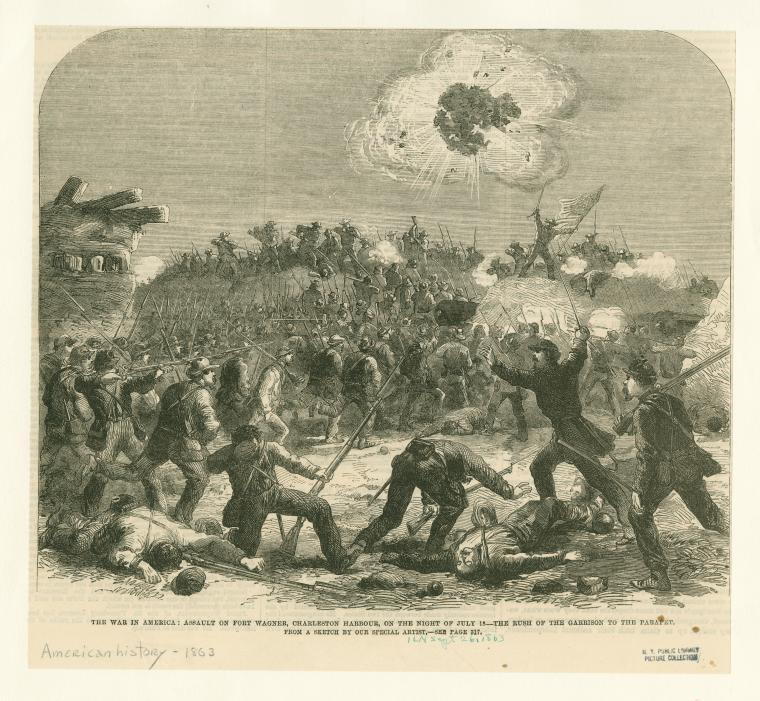
- Assault on Fort Wagner, Charleston Harbour, on the night of July 18
Date	July 18, 1863
Location	Morris Island, South Carolina 32°43′48″N 79°52′16″W
Result	Confederate victory

Belligerents
United States	Confederate States

Commanders and leaders
Quincy A. Gillmore; Truman Seymour; John A. Dahlgren; Robert Gould Shaw †; George C. Strong †	P.G.T. Beauregard; William B. Taliaferro; Johnson Hagood

Units involved
See Union Order of Battle	See Confederate Order of Battle

Strength
5,000 troops 6 Ironclads	1,800 troops

Casualties and losses
1,515 total (246 killed; 880 wounded; 389 missing/captured)	174 total (36 killed; 133 wounded; 5 missing/captured)

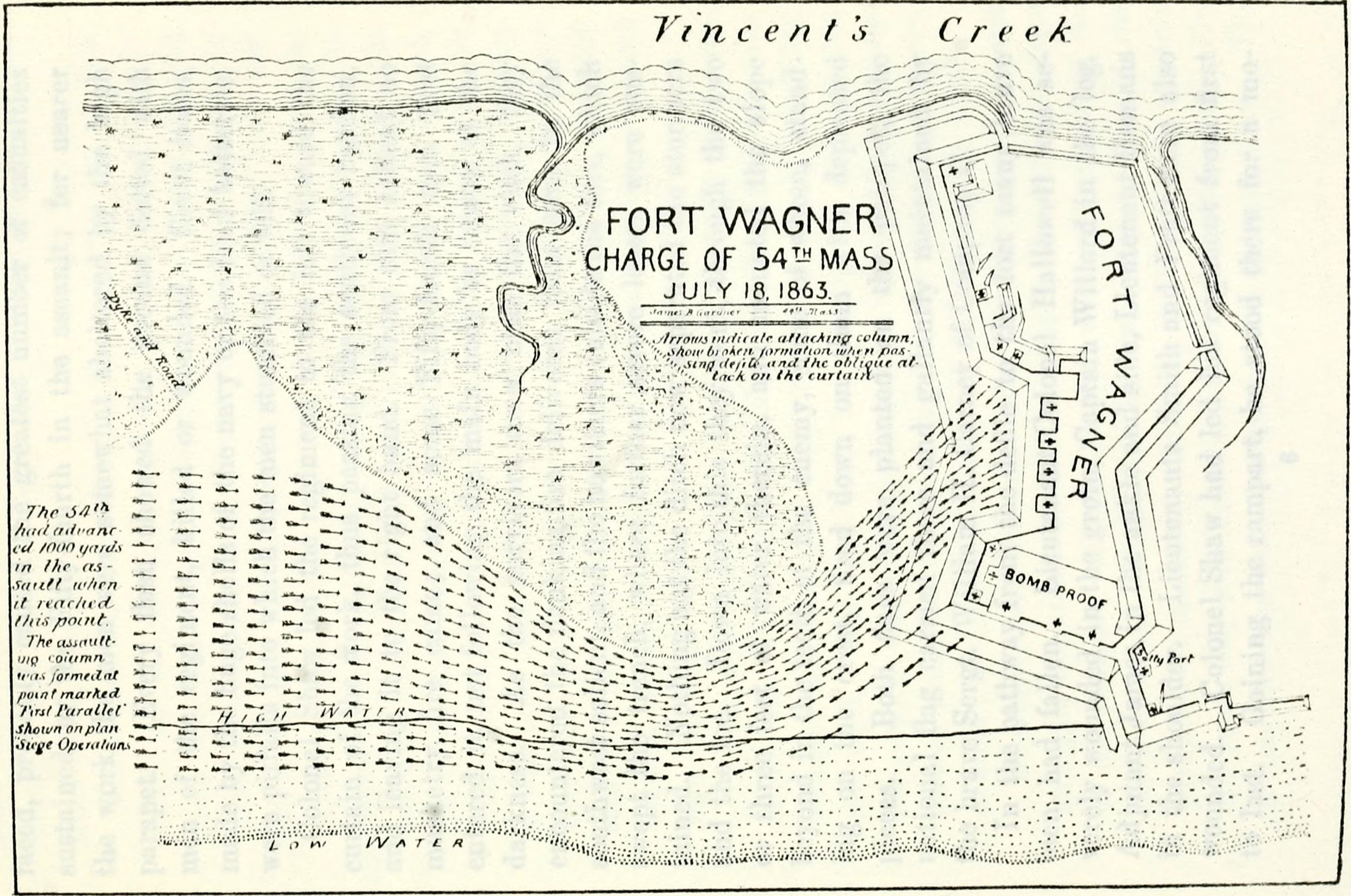
Map of the charge of the 54th Massachusetts

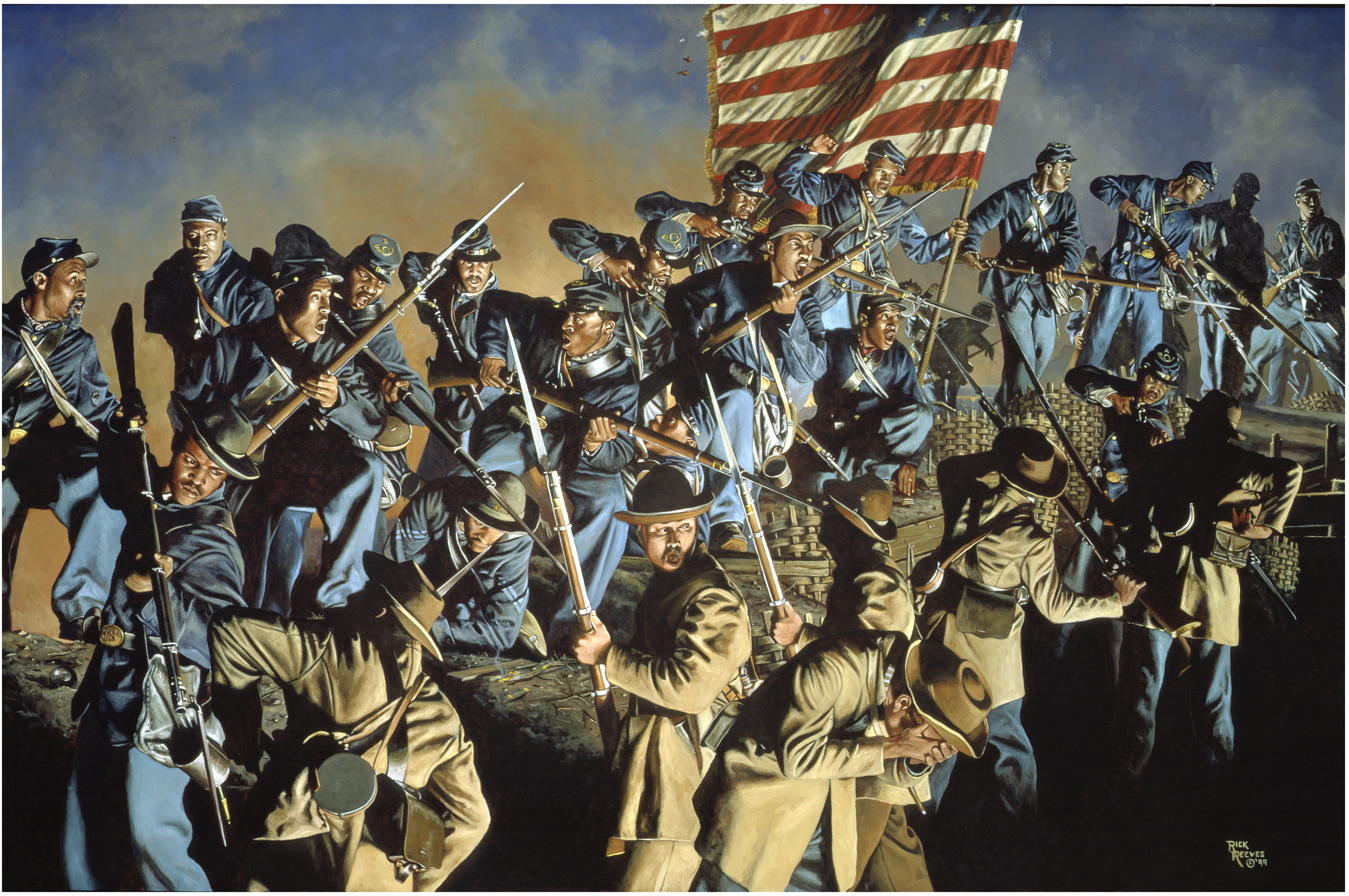
Depiction of the battle in the painting The Old Flag Never Touched the Ground

The Second Battle of Fort Wagner, also known as the Second Assault on Morris Island or the Battle of Fort Wagner, Morris Island, was fought on July 18, 1863, during the American Civil War. Union Army troops commanded by Brig. Gen. Quincy Gillmore launched an unsuccessful assault on the Confederate fortress of Fort Wagner, which protected Morris Island, south of Charleston Harbor. The battle occurred one week after the First Battle of Fort Wagner. Although it was a Confederate victory, the valor of the black Union soldiers was widely praised. This had long-term strategic benefits by encouraging more African Americans to enlist, affording the Union a manpower resource that the Confederacy could not match for the remainder of the war.

== Background ==
Fort Wagner, or Battery Wagner as it was known to the Confederates, controlled the southern approaches to Charleston Harbor. It was commanded by Brigadier General William B. Taliaferro. On July 10 and 11, 1863, in the First Battle of Fort Wagner, the Union army assaulted the fort but was repulsed, suffering heavy losses from artillery and musket fire. Brigadier General Quincy Gillmore intended to repeat his assault, but first executed feints to distract the Confederates' attention, at the Battle of Grimball's Landing on July 16. Gillmore also ordered an artillery bombardment of the fort. The fort was on a very narrow island so the Union could assault it only with one regiment at a time.

The approach to the fort was constricted to a strip of beach 60 yards (55 m) wide with the ocean to the east and the marsh from Vincent's (now Bass) Creek to the west. Upon rounding this defile, the Union army was presented with the 250-yard south face of Fort Wagner, which stretched from Vincent's creek to the sea. Surrounding the fort was a shallow moat riveted with sharpened palmetto logs, an abatis, and the moat on the seaward side had planks with spikes positioned beneath the water. The armament of Fort Wagner on the night of July 18 consisted of one 10-inch seacoast mortar, two 32 lb. carronades, two 8-inch shell guns, two 32 lb. howitzers, a 42 lb. carronade,Carronade and an 8-inch seacoast mortar on the land face. Company A of the 1st South Carolina Artillery also had two guns positioned outside of Wagner's southern face by Vincent's creek to provide enfilading fire. The sea face of Wagner was armed with one 32 lb. carronade, one 10-inch Columbiad, and two 12 lb. howitzers. The garrison of Battery Wagner consisted of the 1st South Carolina Artillery, the Charleston Battalion, the 31st North Carolina, and the 51st North Carolina.

== Battle ==
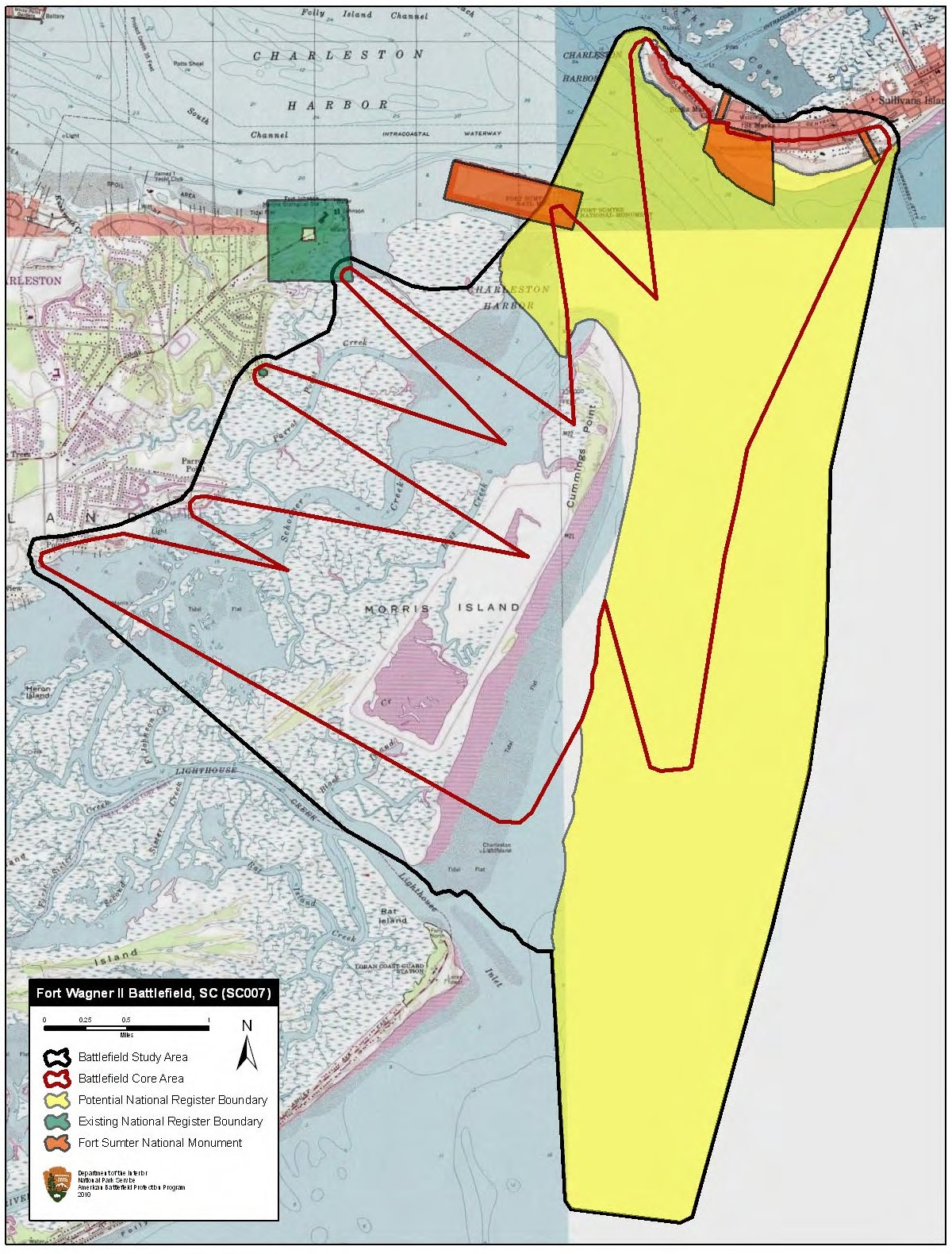
Map of Fort Wagner II Battlefield core and study areas by the American Battlefield Protection Program

Gillmore ordered his siege guns and mortars to begin a bombardment of the fort on July 18 and they were joined by the naval gunfire from six monitors that pulled to within 300 yards of the fort. The bombardment lasted eight hours, but caused little damage against the sandy walls of the fort, and in all, killed only about 8 men and wounded an additional 20, as the defenders had taken cover in the bombproof shelter.

The 54th Massachusetts, an infantry regiment composed of African-American soldiers led by Colonel Robert Gould Shaw, led the Union attack at dusk. They were backed by two brigades composed of nine regiments. The first brigade was commanded by General George Crockett Strong and was composed of the 54th Massachusetts, 6th Connecticut, 48th New York, 3rd New Hampshire, 76th Pennsylvania, and the 9th Maine regiments. The second brigade was commanded by Colonel Haldimand S. Putnam of the 7th New Hampshire as acting brigade commander. His brigade consisted of the 7th New Hampshire, 62nd Ohio, 67th Ohio, and the 100th New York regiments. A third brigade, under General Stevenson, was in reserve, with General Truman Seymour commanding on the field, but not entering action.

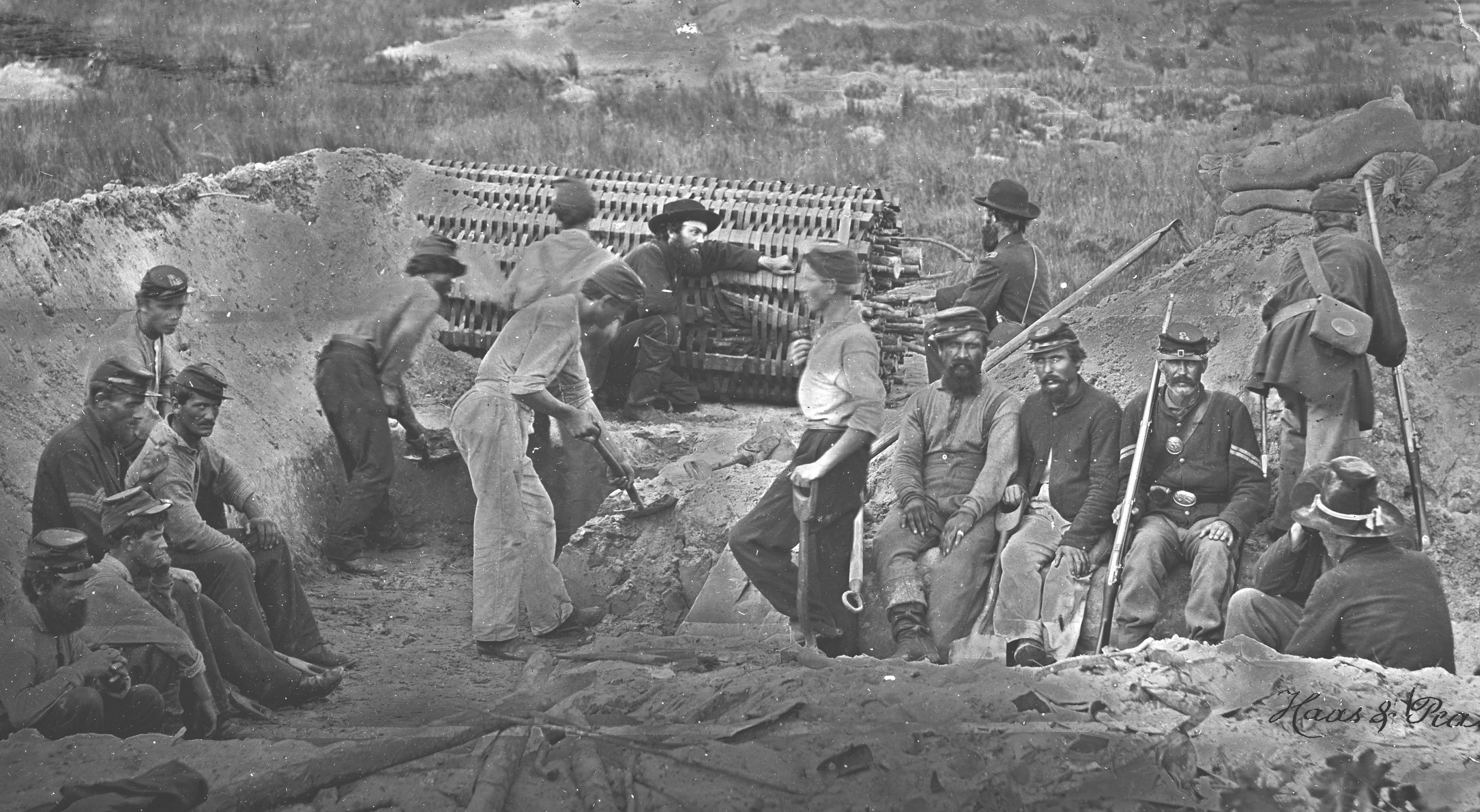
Sappers of the 1st New York engineer regiment digging a sap with sap rollers towards the fortifications of Fort Wagner, September 1863

The assault began at 7:45 p.m. and was conducted in three movements. The 54th Massachusetts attacked to the west upon the curtain of Wagner, with the remainder of General Strong's brigade and Colonel Putnam's brigade attacking the seaward salient on the south face. As the assault commenced and bombardment subsided, the men of the 1st South Carolina Artillery, Charleston Battalion, and 51st North Carolina Infantry took their positions. The 31st North Carolina, which had been completely captured during the battle of Roanoke Island and later exchanged, remained in the bombproof shelter and did not take its position in the southeast bastion. When the 54th Massachusetts reached about 150 yards from the fort, the defenders opened up with cannon and small arms, tearing through their ranks. The 51st North Carolina delivered a direct fire into them, as the Charleston Battalion fired into their left. The 54th managed to reach the parapet, but after a fierce struggle, including hand-to-hand combat, they were forced back. The 6th Connecticut continued the assault at the weakest point, the southeast, where the 31st had failed to take its position. General Taliaferro quickly rounded up some soldiers to take the position, while the 51st North Carolina and Charleston Battalion fired obliquely into the assailants. Behind the 6th Connecticut, the 48th New York also successfully reached the slopes of the bastion. The remainder of Strong's brigade did not reach that far, as three of the defending howitzers were now in action and firing canister into their flanks, bringing them to a halt. Colonel Putnam quickly brought up his brigade, but only about 100 or 200 men from the 62nd and 67th Ohio reached the bastion. The Confederates attempted to counter-attack twice, but were beaten back after having the officers leading the charge shot down. As the Union assault continued to crumble, due to lack of reinforcements from General Stevenson, Taliaferro was reinforced by the 32nd Georgia Infantry, which had been transported to the island by Brigadier General Johnson Hagood. The fresh troops swept over the bastion, killing or capturing the rest of the Union troops that remained.

By 10:00 p.m. the bloody struggle had concluded with heavy losses. General George Crockett Strong was mortally wounded in the thigh by grape shot while trying to rally his men. Colonel Haldimand S. Putnam was shot in the head and killed in the salient while giving the order to withdraw. Colonel John Lyman Chatfield of the 6th Connecticut was mortally wounded. The 54th Massachusetts's colonel, Robert Gould Shaw, was killed upon the parapet early in the action. Some Confederate reports claim his body was pierced seven times, with the fatal wound a rifle bullet to his chest. Sergeant Major Lewis Henry Douglass, son of the famous orator Frederick Douglass, survived the battle and wrote about it in a letter to his future wife.

== Aftermath ==
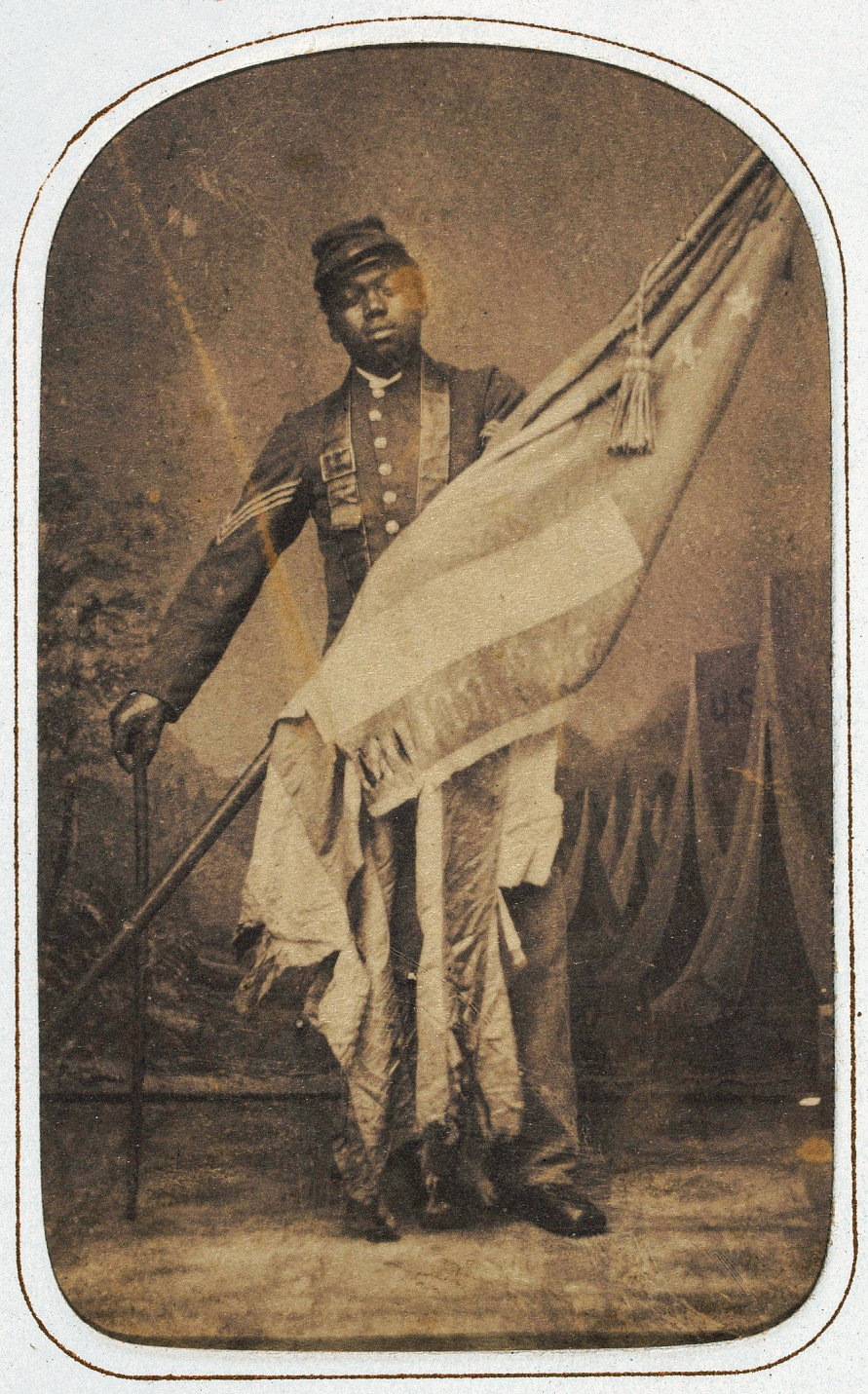
William Harvey Carney

In all, about 1,515 Union soldiers were killed, captured, or wounded in the assault of July 18, although this number has never been accurately ascertained. General Hagood, the commander of Fort Wagner on the morning of July 19, stated in his report to General P. G. T. Beauregard that he buried 800 bodies in mass graves in front of Wagner. Only 315 men were left from the 54th after the battle. Thirty were killed in action, including Colonel Shaw and captains Russel and Simpkins, and buried together in a single grave. Twenty-four later died of wounds, fifteen were captured, and fifty-two were reported missing after the battle and never seen again. The men of the 54th Massachusetts were hailed for their valor. William Carney, an African-American sergeant with the 54th, is a recipient of the Medal of Honor, for his actions that day in recovering and returning the unit's U.S. flag to Union lines. Their conduct improved the reputation of African Americans as soldiers, leading to greater Union recruitment of African-Americans, which strengthened the Northern states' numerical advantage. The Confederate congress had passed a law in May 1863, supporting an earlier declaration by President Davis, that excluded black soldiers and their white officers from exchange. Since some of the black Union soldiers captured during the battle were not exchanged with their white comrades, President Lincoln issued General Order 252 stopping all prisoner exchanges (a policy often wrongly attributed to General Grant). Confederate casualties numbered 174.

The fort was reinforced by Brigadier General Johnson Hagood's brigade shortly after the assault had ended. The garrison of Fort Wagner was then changed during the night, and General Hagood assumed command. He was relieved by Colonel Laurence M. Keitt, who commanded the fort until it was abandoned on September 7. General Hagood wrote a book titled Memoirs of the War of Secession, in which he states that the constant bombardment from the Union guns in the weeks following the second battle had unearthed such large numbers of the Union dead buried after the assault of July 18, and the air was so sickening with the smell of death, that one could no longer stand to be in the fort. The constant bombardment caused Confederate soldiers who were killed during the siege to be buried in the walls of Wagner, and they were also constantly being unearthed. Following the Union repulse, engineers besieged the fort. The Confederates abandoned the fort on September 7, 1863, after resisting 60 days of shelling, it having been deemed untenable because of the damage from constant bombardment, lack of provisions, and the close proximity of the Union siege trenches to Wagner.

== Battlefield preservation ==
In May 2008, the Trust for Public Land (TPL) and partners, including the South Carolina Conservation Bank, the South Carolina State Ports Authority, the Civil War Trust, (a division of the American Battlefield Trust) and many private donors, purchased the island on behalf of the City of Charleston from Ginn Resorts for $3 million. Previously, in 2003, when a builder announced his plans to build houses on the tract, for which he had an option to buy, the Trust, local preservationist Blake Hallman and others formed the Morris Island Coalition, generated media attention and support for preservation and defeated the effort. Ginn Resorts was interested in developing the property, too, but ultimately decided to purchase it and then immediately sell it to the preservationists. According to TPL, the city and county are working "to complete a management plan to protect the island's nationally significant historical and natural resources".

== In popular culture ==
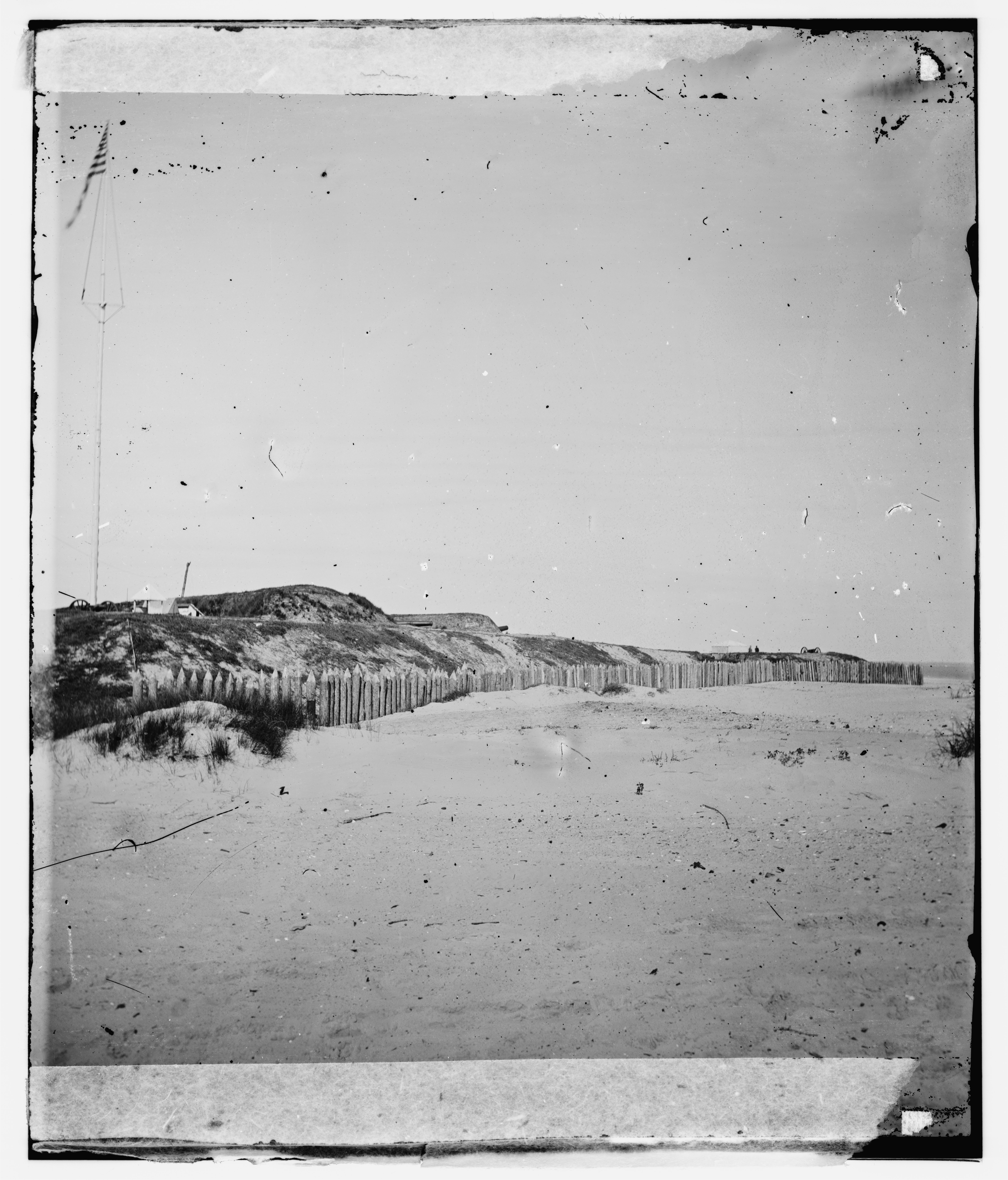
View of the parapet of forts Wagner & Gregg after being abandoned by the confederates

An early short story by Louisa May Alcott, "My Contraband" (1863), depicts the aftermath of the battle, with the protagonist, a Union Army nurse, tending to wounded and dying soldiers of the 54th Regiment.

A depiction of the battle is the climax of the 1989 film Glory.
