= Fort Gregg =

Historical site in Petersburg, Virginia

Coordinates: 37°11.883′N 77°27.015′W

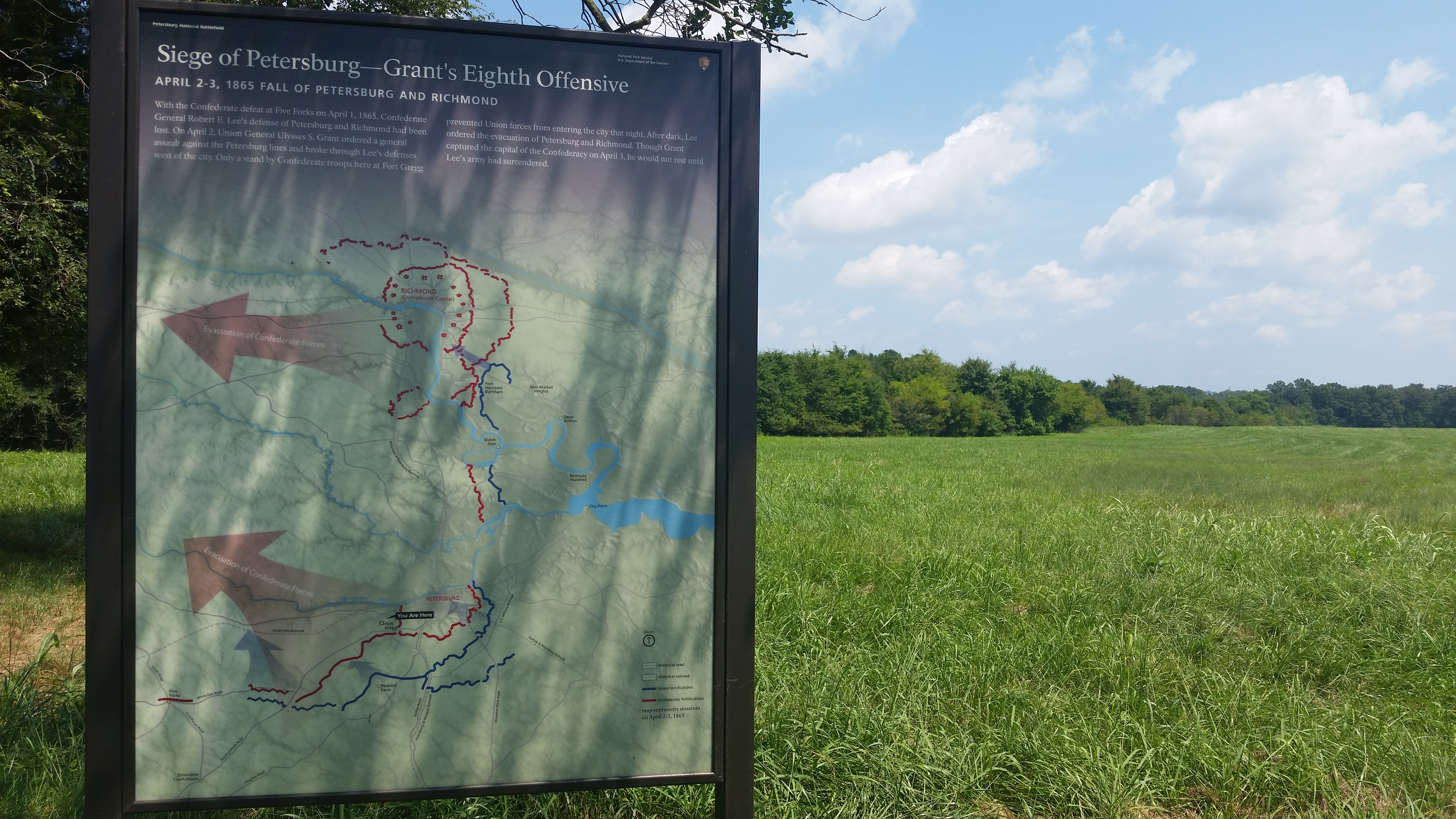
National Park Service marker for Fort Gregg

Fort Gregg was a Confederate fort located near Petersburg, Virginia.

== American Civil War ==
During the Third Battle of Petersburg, on the evening of April 1, 1865, the brigades of Lane's and Thomas's, with these two brigades being a part of Wilcox's Division, came under heavy Union artillery fire, intending to soften the Confederate fortifications. Confederate artillery responded. During this artillery exchange, over 14,000 Union forces from Wright's IV Corps managed to sneak forward between the Union forts of Welch and Fisher, and as they approached the picket line, the Union soldiers went prone and awaited for the attack on the Fort.
