= 67th Ohio Infantry Regiment =

- Active: October 1861 to December 12, 1865
- Country: United States
- Allegiance: Union
- Branch: Infantry
- Engagements: First Battle of Kernstown; Battle of Winchester; Battle of Port Republic; Seven Days Battles; Battle of Fort Wagner; Siege of Charleston; Battle of Drewry's Bluff; Siege of Petersburg; Battle of Chaffin's Farm; Appomattox Campaign

The 67th Ohio Infantry Regiment was an infantry regiment in the Union Army during the American Civil War.

== Service ==
The 67th Ohio Infantry Regiment was organized by consolidation of recruits for the 67th Ohio Infantry and 45th Ohio Infantry and mustered in for three years service under the command of Colonel Otto. The regiment was initially armed with outdated Prussian Potsdam muskets, an unpopular weapon that the soldiers considered more dangerous to the shooter than the person being shot at, aside from the flank companies which had Enfield rifles (the Potsdam muskets were replaced with Springfield rifles later that year). Colonel Burstenbinder was even less popular, being described in regimental histories as "an imbecile, imposter, and knave detested by all". He had completely failed to instill even a minimum of training and discipline in the regiment, and on March 12, 1862, he was arrested and court-martialed. Lt. Col Alvin C. Voris assumed command of the regiment and led it in its first engagement at Kernstown. He was promoted to colonel shortly after the battle and led the regiment for the remainder of its service. At Ft. Waagner in 1863, Voris was wounded in the abdomen but remained on duty. He achieved a degree of medical history a decade after the war when he underwent surgery after complaining of severe abdominal pain. Doctors found half of a Minie ball lodged in his bladder, and Voris had gone with this condition for years without any apparent ill effects. He recovered successfully from the operation and lived until 1904 when he died at the age of 77.

The regiment was attached to 1st Brigade, Landers' Division, Army of the Potomac, to March 1862. 1st Brigade, Shields' 2nd Division, Banks' V Corps, and Department of the Shenandoah, to May 1862. 1st Brigade, Shields' Division, Department of the Rappahannock, May 1862. 2nd Brigade, Shields' Division, Department of the Rappahannock, to July 1862. 3rd Brigade, 2nd Division, IV Corps, Army of the Potomac, to September 1862. Ferry's Brigade, Division at Suffolk, Virginia, VII Corps, Department of Virginia, to January 1863. 1st Brigade, 3rd Division, XVIII Corps, Department of North Carolina, to February 1863. 3rd Brigade, 2nd Division, XVIII Corps, Department of the South, to April 1863. U.S. Forces, Folly Island, South Carolina, X Corps, Department of the South, to June 1863. 1st Brigade, Folly Island, South Carolina, X Corps, to July 1863. 1st Brigade, 2nd Division, Morris Island, South Carolina, X Corps, July 1863. 2nd Brigade, Morris Island, South Carolina, X Corps, to October 1863. Howell's Brigade, Gordon's Division, Folly Island, South Carolina, X Corps, to December 1863. District Hilton Head, South Carolina, 10th Army Corps, to April 1864. 1st Brigade, 1st Division, X Corps, Army of the James, Department of Virginia and North Carolina, to December 1864. 1st Brigade, 1st Division, XXIV Corps, to August 1865. Department of Virginia to December 1865.

The 67th Ohio Infantry mustered out of service at City Point, Virginia, on December 12, 1865.

== Detailed service ==
=== 1862 ===
Left Ohio for western Virginia January 19, 1862. Duty at Paw Paw Tunnel and Great Cacapon Creek until March 10, 1862. Advance on Winchester, Va., March 10–15. Reconnaissance to Strasburg March 18–21. Battle of Winchester, March 22–23. Strasburg March 27. Woodstock April 1. Edenburg April 2. March to Fredericksburg, Va., May 12–21, then to Front Royal May 25–30. Battle of Port Republic June 9 (cover retreat). Ordered to the Virginia Peninsula June 29. Harrison's Landing July 3–4. Westover July 3. At Harrison's Landing until August 16. Movement to Fortress Monroe August 16–23, then moved to Suffolk, Va., and duty there until December 31. Moved to Norfolk, Va., December 31, then to Beaufort and New Berne, N.C., January 4, 1863.

=== 1863 ===
Moved to Port Royal, S.C., January 25. At Hilton Head February 9, and at St. Helena Island, S.C., until April. Occupation of Folly Island, S.C., April 3-July 10. Attack on Morris Island July 10. Assaults on Fort Wagner, Morris Island, S.C., July 11 and 18. Siege of Fort Wagner, Morris Island, and operations against Fort Sumter and Charleston July 18-September 7. Capture of Forts Wagner and Gregg, Morris Island, September 7. Operations against Charleston until October 31. Moved to Hilton Head, S.C., and duty there until April 1864.

=== 1864 ===
Regiment reenlisted January 1864. Whitmarsh Island, Ga., February 22. Moved to Yorktown, Va., April. Butler's operations on south side of the James River and against Petersburg and Richmond May 4–28. Occupation of Bermuda Hundred, and City Point, Va., May 5. Ware Bottom Church May 9. Chester Station, May 9–10. Operations against Fort Darling May 12–16. Battle of Drewry's Bluff, May 14–16. Bermuda Hundred front May 17–30. Ware Bottom Church May 20. Petersburg June 9. Port Walthal and on the Bermuda Hundred front June 16–17. Siege operations against Petersburg and Richmond June 16, 1864, to April 2, 1865. Wier Bottom Church June 20, 1864. Demonstration north of the James at Deep Bottom, August 13–20. Strawberry Plains August 14–18. New Market Heights, Chaffin's Farm, September 29-October 2. Darbytown Road October 7 and 13. Fair Oaks October 27–28. Duty in trenches north of James before Richmond until March 1865.

=== 1865 ===
Moved to Hatcher's Run March 27–28. Appomattox Campaign March 28-April 9. Fall of Petersburg, April 2. Pursuit of Lee April 3–9. Rice's Station April 6. Appomattox Court House April 9. Surrender of Lee and his army. Garrison and guard duty in District of South Anna, Department of Virginia, until December.

== Casualties ==
The regiment lost a total of 293 men during service; 11 officers and 131 enlisted men killed or mortally wounded, 1 officer and 150 enlisted men died of disease.

== Commanders ==
- Colonel Otto Burstenbinder
- Colonel Alvin C. Voris
- Major Lewis Butler

== See also ==
- List of Ohio Civil War units
- Ohio in the Civil War
- First Battle of Kernstown
- Battle of Winchester
- Battle of Port Republic
- Seven Days Battles
- Battle of Fort Wagner
- Siege of Charleston
- Battle of Drewry's Bluff
- Siege of Petersburg
- Battle of Chaffin's Farm
- Appomattox Campaign
