= Battle of Darbytown and New Market Roads =

Battle of the American Civil War

Coordinates: 37.4576°N 77.3467°W

- Part of the American Civil War
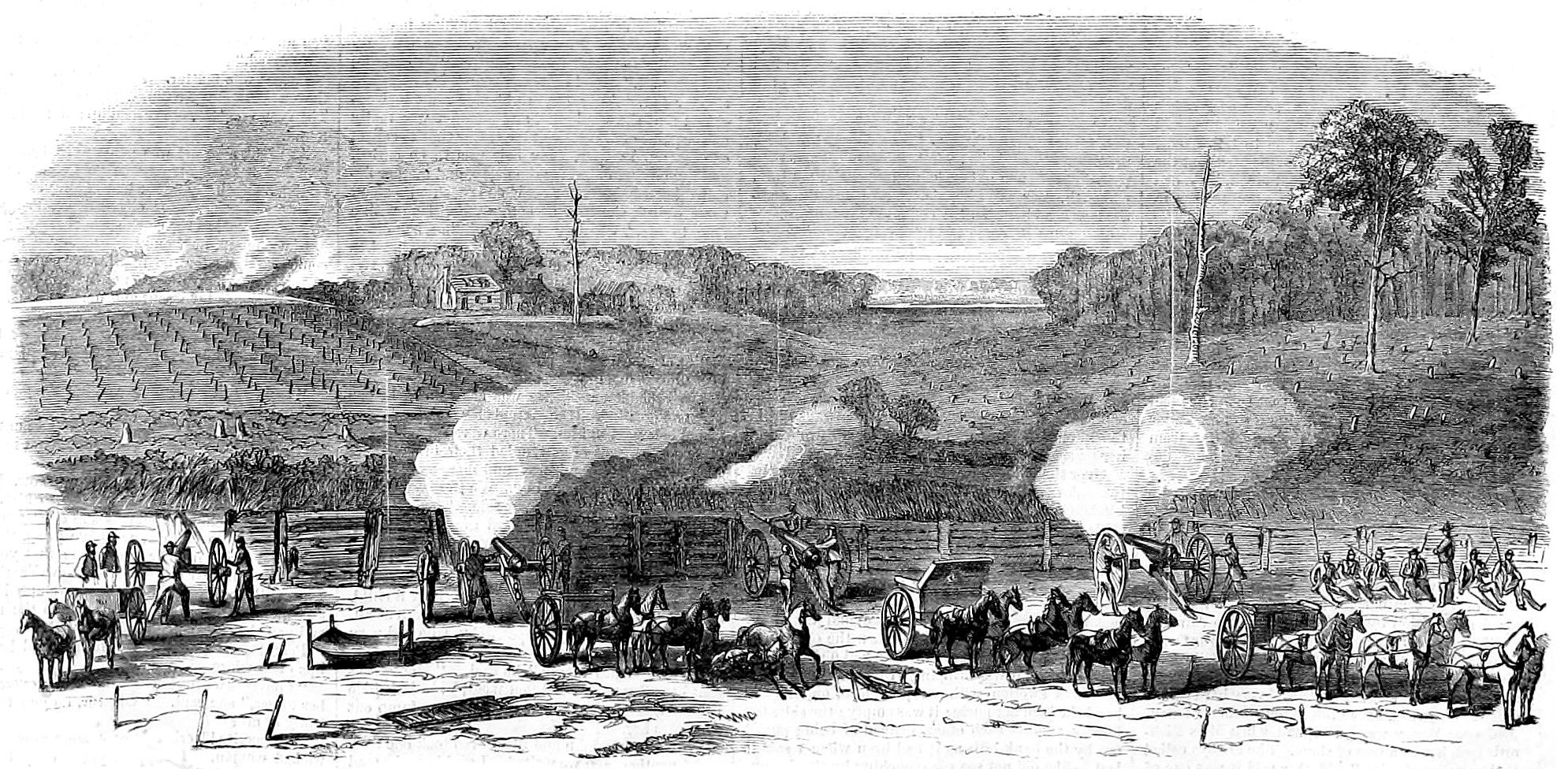
Date	October 7, 1864
Location	Henrico County, Virginia
Result	Union victory

Belligerents
United States (Union)	(Confederate States of America) CSA (Confederacy)

Commanders and leaders
Ulysses S. Grant; David B. Birney; August V. Kautz	Robert E. Lee

Strength
X Corps	2 Divisions

Casualties and losses
458 (Killed 49, Wounded 253, Captured or Missing 156)	700

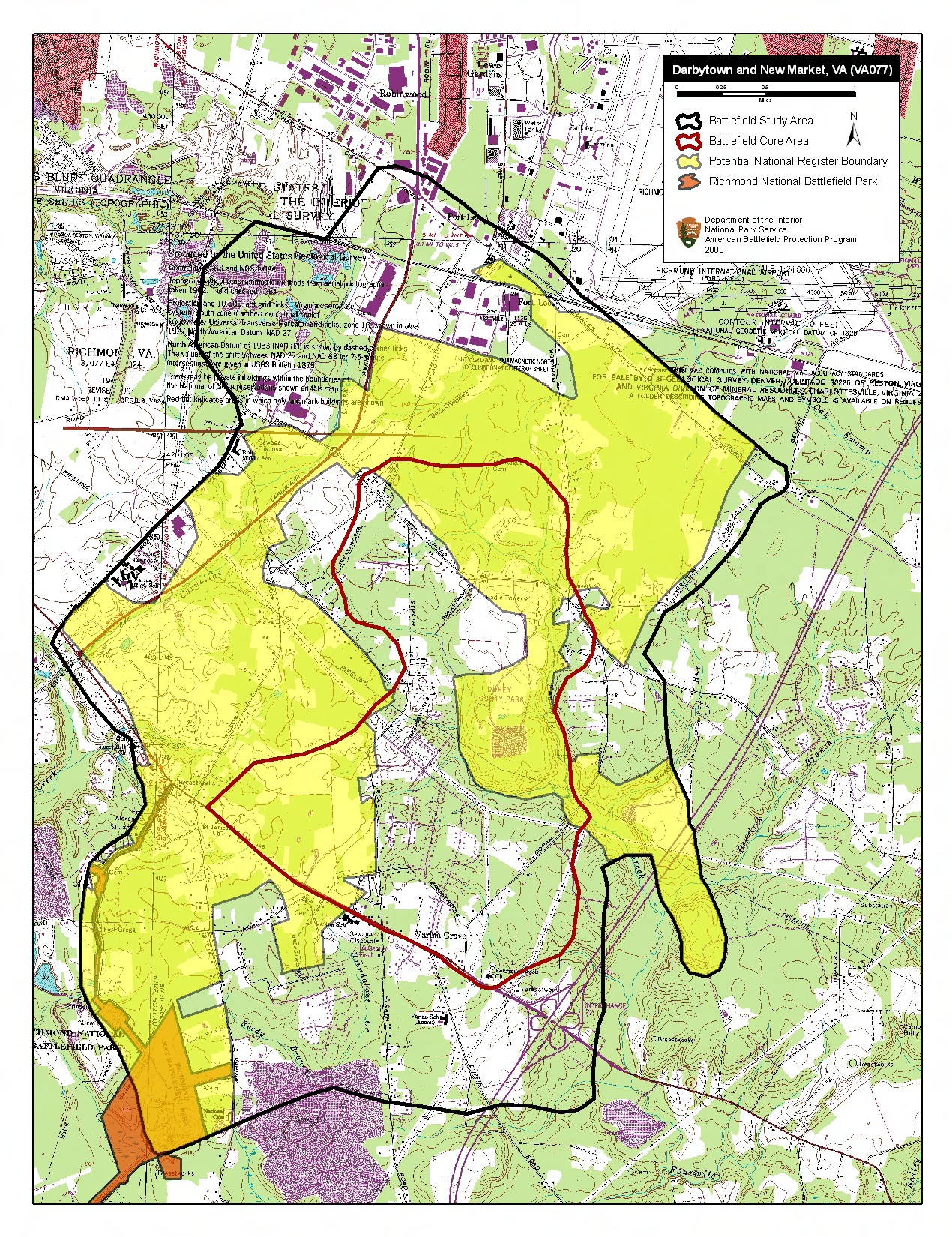
Map of Darbytown and New Market Battlefield core and study areas by the American Battlefield Protection Program.

The Battle of Darbytown and New Market Roads (or Johnson's Farm or Four Mile Creek) was an engagement between Union and Confederate forces during the American Civil War, which took place on October 7, 1864, in Henrico County, Virginia, as part of the Richmond-Petersburg Campaign.

== Background ==
The Richmond-Petersburg Campaign (June 15, 1864 – March 25, 1865) was a Union effort to capture the city of Petersburg, Virginia, from Confederate forces under the command of Confederate General Robert E. Lee. During the Battle of Chaffin's Farm, Union forces captured Fort Harrison from the Confederates on September 30. This prompted Lee to order an offensive on the right flank of the Union forces, which were under the command of Lt. Gen. Ulysses S. Grant, on October 7.

== Battle ==
The Union defensive lines, commanded by Brig. Gen. August V. Kautz and Maj. Gen. David B. Birney, were positioned along the length of New Market Road, with further Union cavalry defending Darbytown Road.

The initial Confederate attack, commanded by Maj. Gens. Robert Hoke and Charles W. Field, was successful in dislodging the Union Cavalry from Darbytown Road. The cavalry forces routed from the field, the confederates then attacked the Union defensive lines on the New Market Road. During this attack, the Confederate Texas Brigade's commander Brig. Gen. John Gregg was killed, and the attack was repulsed. The engagement resulted with a Confederate withdrawal to Richmond and thus Union victory.
