= Nathan Huntley Edgerton =

Nathan H. Edgerton
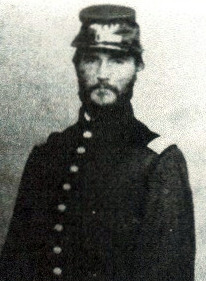
- Nathan H. Edgerton
- Born: August 28, 1839; Barnesville, Ohio, U.S.
- Died: October 27, 1932 (aged 93); Agness, Oregon, U.S.
- Burial place: on his farm in Agness, Oregon
- Military career
- Allegiance: United States; Union
- Branch: United States Army; Union Army
- Service years: 1863–1865
- Rank: First Lieutenant and Adjutant
- Unit: 6th Regiment United States Colored Troops
- Conflicts: American Civil War: Battle of New Market Heights
- Awards: Medal of Honor

Nathan Huntley Edgerton (August 28, 1839 – October 27, 1932) was a Union Army officer who received the Medal of Honor for gallantry in the American Civil War.

== Early life ==
Nathan Huntley Edgerton was born on a farm, the eleventh out of thirteen children of Joseph Jesse Edgerton (1797–1865) and Charity Doudna (1799–1855). Joseph and Charity were both Quakers who had moved north from Wayne County, North Carolina, and into the Ohio farmlands in the Ohio valley when they were teenagers. The farm they built was in Barnesville, Ohio, at the western edge of Belmont County which is opposite Wheeling, West Virginia, on the Ohio River, approximately 70 miles southwest of Pittsburgh. Edgerton's family were members of the Ohio Yearly Meeting of the Religious Society of Friends (Quakers). In Barnesville, he was a contemporary of Elisha Gray (1835–1901), the electrical engineer and co-founder of Western Electric, and Isaac C. Parker (1838–1896), the politician and jurist. Also, Barnesville was notable during his childhood as the hometown of the governor, Wilson Shannon (1802–1877).

Of Charity Doudna Edgerton's thirteen children, Nathan Edgerton (she was 39 when he was born) was one of eight that survived to adulthood. At 17, on December 2, 1855, Edgerton lost his mother. By 1858, his father had remarried to Anna Mikkel Stratton (1817–1897) by whom Nathan gained a half-brother and two half-sisters, all of whom survived to adulthood.

== Career ==
Upon completion of his education, he became a schoolteacher and was listed in the 1860 census as a teacher on the faculty of the Westtown School in West Chester, Pennsylvania. It was while he was teaching here that he met Esther Lundy Mendenhall (1844–1914), a young, local Quaker woman.

In the antebellum years, the Society of Friends, were noted for their commitment to abolition and equality for the African-Americans. However, having been born and raised as a Quaker, Edgerton did not join the war until 1863, when the Army of Northern Virginia invaded Pennsylvania. In so doing, he and his then fiancée, Miss Mendenhall, broke covenant with the Society of Friends. He joined the Pennsylvania militia, and served until the end of the Gettysburg campaign. A few months later, he was commissioned a first lieutenant in the 6th United States Colored Infantry Regiment.

By 1864, Lt. Edgerton had become the adjutant of the 6th USCT. In the early morning of September 29, 1864, his regiment advanced against the Confederate line at the Battle of New Market Heights in Virginia.

The enemy held their fire until the Black soldiers were within 150 yards then unleashed a deadly volley of lead. One Union flag bearer was shot down, then another, then a third. Lt. Edgerton, despite being wounded himself, lifted up the flag and advanced it with his regiment until the Confederates retreated. Two senior non-commissioned officers of the regiment, both African-Americans, advanced the regimental colors with Lt. Edgerton. They were Sergeant Major Thomas R. Hawkins and First Sergeant Alexander Kelly. The three men, Edgerton, Hawkins, and Kelly are depicted in a painting, Three Medals of Honor by artist Don Troiani. The painting was unveiled June 24, 2013, at the Union League of Philadelphia.

Almost two months later, on November 16, 1864, he married his fiancée, Esther Lu, at Christ Church, Philadelphia. After the wedding he returned to his regiment at the new year. Edgerton was promoted to captain while serving with the 6th USCT before the end of the war. Capt Nathaniel Edgerton was discharged from active duty September 20, 1865, less than a week after the birth of his first son, Arthur Duncan Edgerton (1865–1944). Upon his return to Philadelphia, he and his family moved to Schuylkill Township where they bought a home, and he found employment as a General Supervisor of Personnel for the Pennsylvania Railroad. In the ensuing years, Esther Lu and Nathaniel welcomed Edward Guy Carleton Edgerton (1872–1956), Ethelwynne Maude Edgerton (1874–1955), and Ralph Malcolm Edgerton (1876 – c. 1950).

By 1880, the family had relocated to 63 Wayne St. in North Philadelphia, near Wayne Junction, where he worked as an agent for the electric light company. The gradual publication of the official war records from the end of the conflict through 1900 led to reviews of acts of valor by the US Army and Navy which led to nominations for the Medal of Honor in the latter half of the nineteenth century. For his conspicuous act of bravery, Edgerton was awarded the Medal of Honor. He received his medal on March 30, 1898.

By 1900, Edgerton and his wife were renting a farm in Lower Providence Township with their youngest son, Ralph, as Nathaniel worked as an electrician.

Some time before 1910, Edgerton and his wife moved to a farm in Agness, Oregon, that they purchased with their son Ralph. Edgerton found work as an electrical engineer in Oregon while his son, Ralph ran the farm. In 1914, he lost his wife Esther Lu after almost fifty years of marriage. He soon retired from electrical work and labeled himself a farmer in business with his son in the 1920 and 1930 censuses. On October 27, 1932, the Medal of Honor recipient passed on at the age of 93. Despite initial plans for his burial at Arlington National Cemetery, his family instead chose to bury him on the farm beside Esther Lu. Having outlived his wife, all his siblings, and all his half-siblings, he was survived by his four children, two daughters-in-law, nine grandchildren, and twelve great-grandchildren.

== Medal of Honor citation ==
Rank and organization: Lieutenant and Adjutant, 6th U.S. Colored Troops. Place and date: At Chapins Farm, Va., September 29, 1864. Entered service at: Philadelphia, Pa. Birth: ------. Date of issue: March 30, 1898.

Citation:

The President of the United States of America, in the name of Congress, takes pleasure in presenting the Medal of Honor to First Lieutenant & Adjutant Nathan Huntley Edgerton, United States Army, for extraordinary heroism on 29 September 1864, while serving with 6th U.S. Colored Infantry, in action at Chapin's Farm, Virginia. First Lieutenant Edgerton took up the flag after three Color Bearers had been shot down and bore it forward, though himself wounded.

== See also ==
- List of Medal of Honor recipients
- List of American Civil War Medal of Honor recipients: A–F
- Ohio Yearly Meeting
- Westtown School
- Society of Friends (Quakers)
- Gettysburg campaign
- 6th United States Colored Infantry Regiment
- Battle of New Market Heights
