= Alexander Kelly =

American soldier (1840–1907)

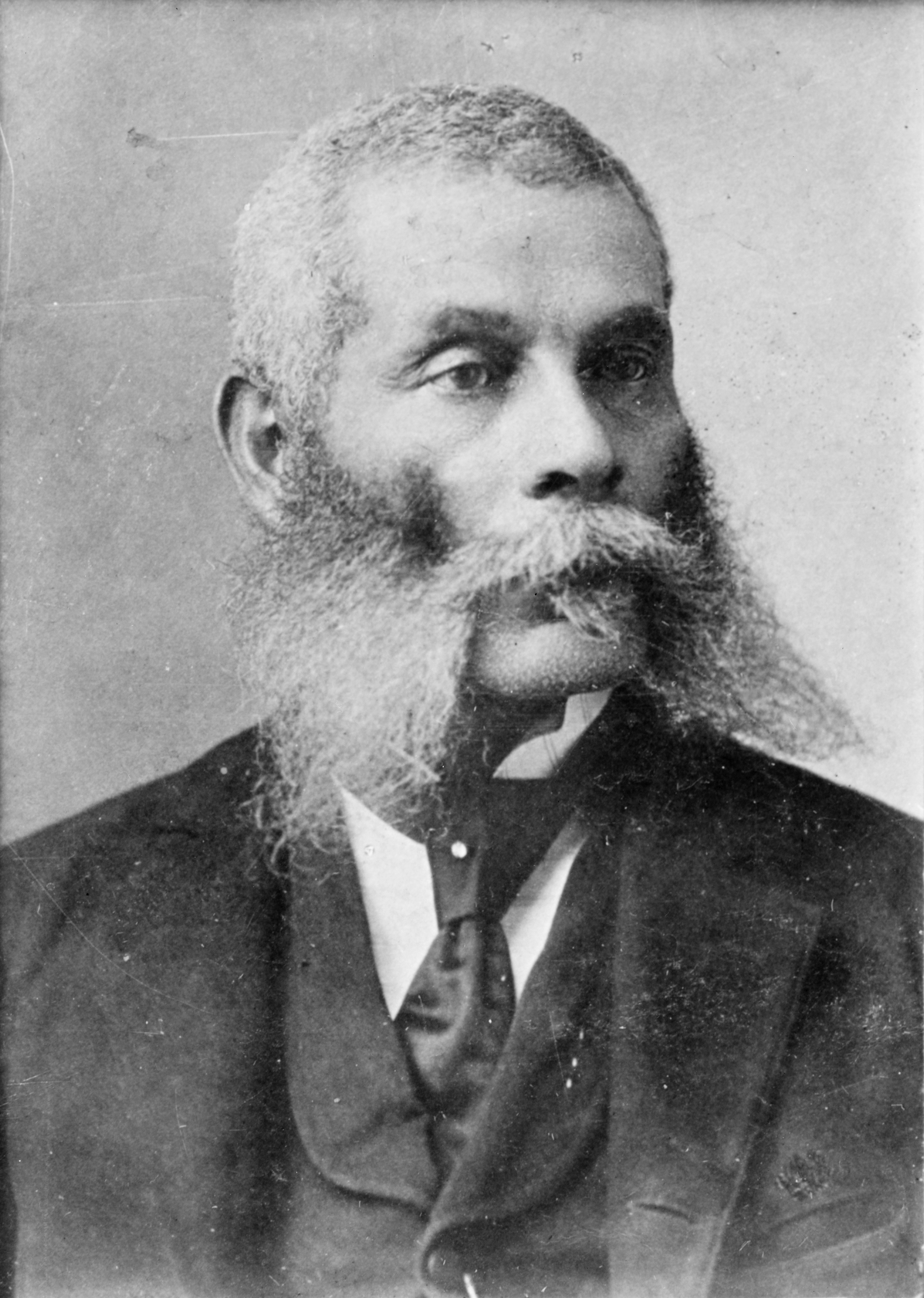
- First Sergeant Alexander Kelly
- Born: April 7, 1840; Pennsylvania
- Died: June 19, 1907 (aged 67)
- Burial place: Saint Peters Cemetery, Pittsburgh, Pennsylvania
- Military career
- Allegiance: United States of America; Union
- Branch: United States Army; Union Army
- Service years: 1863–1865
- Rank: First Sergeant
- Unit: 6th United States Colored Infantry Regiment
- Conflicts: American Civil War: Battle of Chaffin's Farm
- Awards: Medal of Honor

Alexander Kelly (April 7, 1840 – June 19, 1907) was an African-American coal miner and native of Pennsylvania who fought with the Union Army as a member of the 6th United States Colored Infantry Regiment during the American Civil War. He was awarded his nation's highest military decoration—the U.S. Medal of Honor—for his gallantry in the Battle of Chaffin's Farm, Virginia on September 29, 1864.

== Formative years ==
Alexander Kelly was born in Saltsburg, Pennsylvania, on April 7, 1840. According to historian Donald Scott, "Kelly's parentage, service and census data indicate that he was 'mulatto' and with 'light skin,' perhaps indicating mixed ancestry." He "and his siblings were orphaned by 1850, when he was about 10 years old, and lived with an uncle, David Kelly, a 'salt boiler,' and his probable wife Nancy, described [on the 1850 federal census] as 'Keeping House'.... The family was part of a small black community, some working as coal miners and 'salt boilers' in Saltsburg, where the Conemaugh River carried salt deposits." Among the siblings living with him at this time was his 16-year-old brother, Joseph.

Reportedly reaching a stature of just 5'3" by his early adult years, according to U.S. military records, Alexander Kelly became one of those who found work in the coal mines of Western Pennsylvania.

== Civil War ==
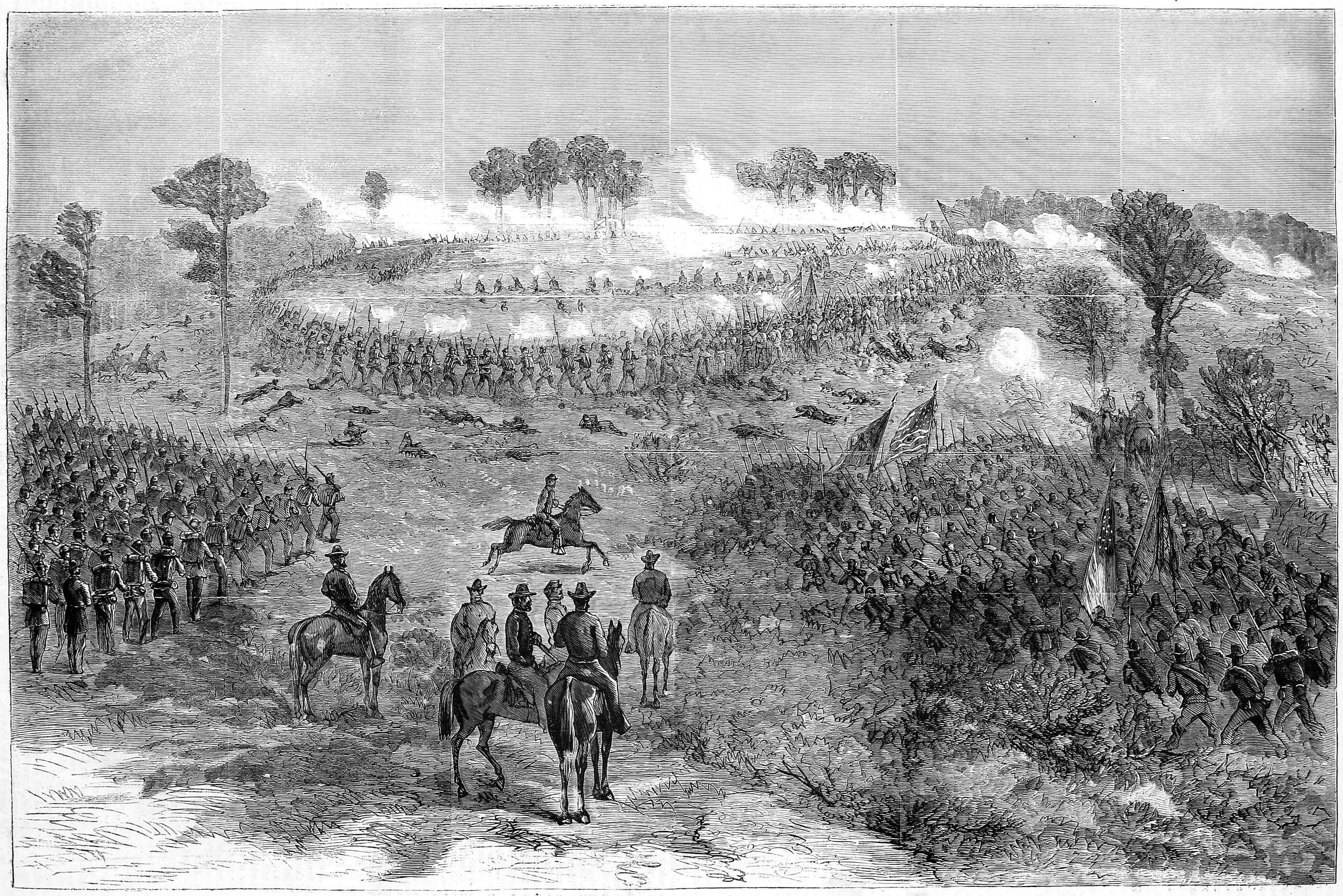
Battle of Chaffin's Farm, Virginia, September 29, 1864 (Harper's Weekly).

In August 1863, when his older brother, Joseph, was drafted for military service, Alexander Kelly enlisted instead. After choosing to serve as his brother's substitute, he mustered in with his regiment at Camp William Penn in Philadelphia's Chelton Hills neighborhood. Stationed initially with the 6th USCT Fortress Monroe and Yorktown, Virginia, he participated with his regiment and other Union troops in the capture of Confederate earthenworks near Petersburg on June 15, 1864. Two months later, they were involved in fortification duties at Dutch Gap on the James River under heavy enemy artillery fire. Kelly then went on to earn the rank of First Sergeant in Company F of the 6th U.S. Colored Infantry Regiment. On September 29, 1864, as his unit was engaged in the Battle of Chaffin's Farm, Virginia, he prevented the national colors from falling into enemy hands as his regiment was storming an abatis of a Confederate States Army regiment from Texas, and also then "rallied the [6th USCT] men at a time of confusion and a place of great danger" — actions which resulted in his being awarded the U.S. Medal of Honor on April 6, 1865.

With the war over and Reconstruction efforts underway, Alexander Kelly mustered out on September 20, 1865.

== Post-war life ==
Following his honorable discharge from the military, Kelly returned home to Pennsylvania, married in 1866 and, together with his wife, Victoria, welcomed the birth of William. Residents of Coutlersville, he and his wife also adopted homeless orphans during their more than 30 years of marriage. Employed as a coal miner, he was later joined on the job by his son. After relocating with his wife to the east side of Pittsburgh sometime during the early 1890s, he was widowed by her in 1898. An aging veteran who was active with the Grand Army of the Republic's Robert G. Shaw Post (No. 206), he then obtained less labor intensive work as the night watchman at the Pittsburgh Police stables sometime after 1900 while his son worked as a music teacher.

== Death and interment ==
On June 19, 1907, Kelly died in Pittsburgh at age 67. Following funeral services, he was buried in that city's Saint Peters Cemetery.

== Medal of Honor citation and other honors ==
First Sergeant Kelly's official Medal of Honor citation reads:

Gallantly seized the colors, which had fallen near the enemy's lines of abatis, raised them and rallied the men at a time of confusion and in a place of the greatest danger.

Kelly's courage at New Market Heights is depicted in a painting, Three Medals of Honor by artist Don Troiani. The painting was scheduled to be unveiled June 24, 2013, at the Union League of Philadelphia. Also portrayed in the painting are two fellow Medal of Honor recipients from the battle, Nathan H. Edgerton and Thomas R. Hawkins.

== See also ==
- List of American Civil War Medal of Honor recipients: G–L
- List of African American Medal of Honor recipients
- Pennsylvania in the American Civil War
