= Nathaniel A. McKown =

Nathaniel Aylesworth McKown
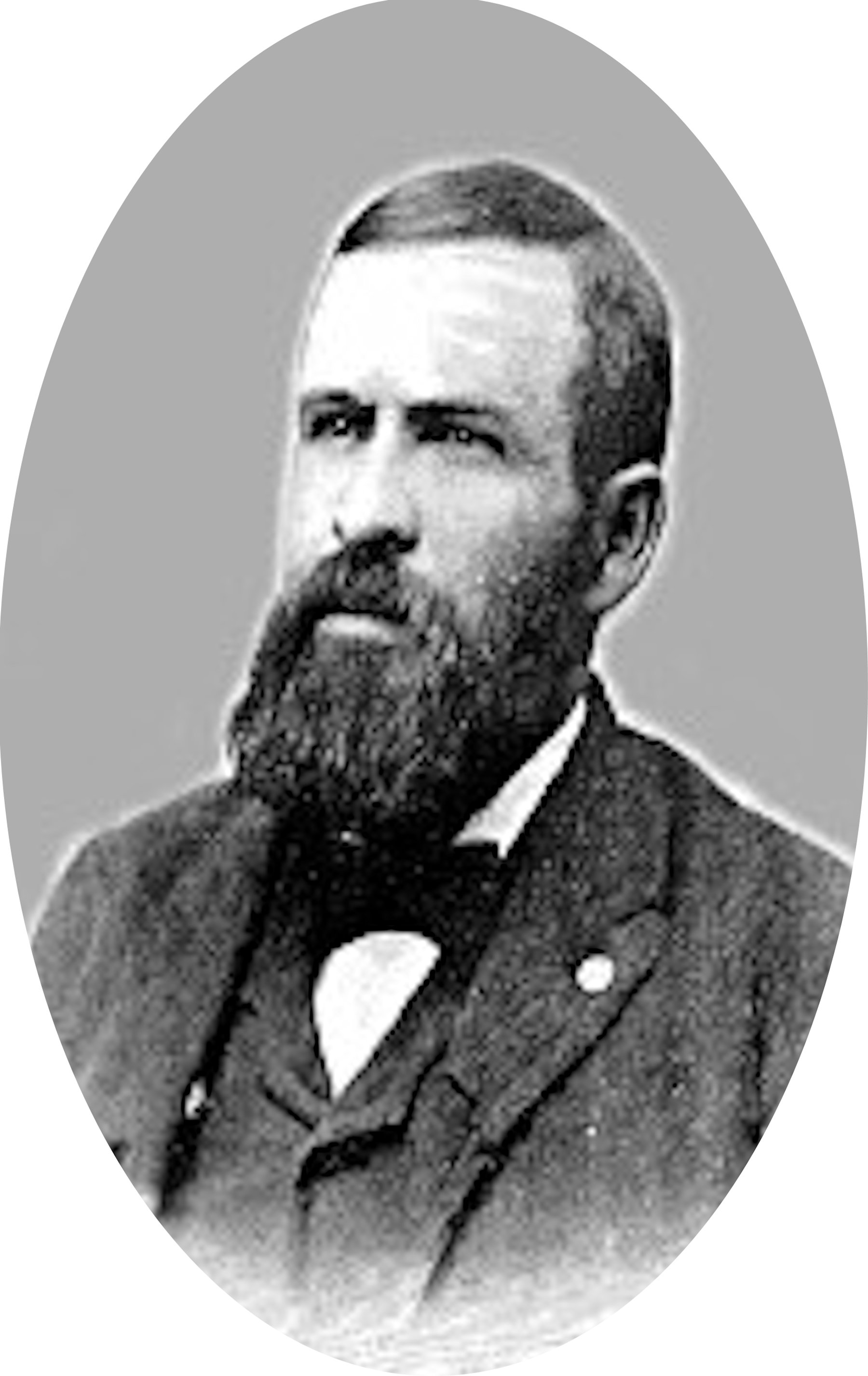
- McKown in 1875
- Born: March 11, 1838; Dimock, Pennsylvania
- Died: August 11, 1902 (aged 64); Forkston, Pennsylvania
- Military career
- Allegiance: Union
- Branch: Union Army
- Service years: 1861-1865
- Rank: First Lieutenant
- Units: Company B, 58th Pennsylvania Infantry Regiment
- Conflicts: American Civil War; Battle of Chaffin's Farm
- Awards: Medal of Honor

Nathaniel Aylesworth McKown (March 11, 1838 - August 11, 1902) was a Union soldier who received the Medal of Honor for capturing a Confederate flag on September 29, 1864.

== Biography ==
Nathaniel McKown was born in Pennsylvania in 1838 to William McKown (1799–1878) and Celesta Gardner (1805–1879). William was a reverend from Ireland and Gardner was from New York.

Nathaniel enlisted in the Union Army on September 5, 1861, and was placed in Company B of the 58th Pennsylvania Infantry Regiment and achieved the rank of Sergeant. On September 29, 1864, during the Battle of Chaffin's Farm, Nathaniel captured a Confederate flag and took it back to Union lines and was awarded the rank of First Lieutenant and the Medal of Honor on April 6, 1865, in Philadelphia.

Following the war, Nathaniel married Clarina Robinson (1839–1929) on March 11, 1866, and had 6 children with her between 1867 and 1877. Nathaniel died in 1902, in Forkston.
