= Henry S. Wells =

American Union soldier during Civil War

Henry S. Wells (1842 - October 27, 1864) was an American Soldier in the American Civil War who was posthumously awarded the Medal of Honor. The medal was awarded on 6 April 1865 for Welch's actions as a private in the 148th New York Volunteer Infantry at the Battle of Chaffin's Farm, Virginia on 29 September 1864. Wells died at Fair Oaks, Virginia on 27 October 1864.

== Medal of Honor Citation ==
For extraordinary heroism on 29 September 1864, in action at Chapin's Farm, Virginia. With two comrades, Private Wells took position in advance of the skirmish line, within short distance of the enemy's gunners, and drove them from their guns.
