= 148th New York Infantry Regiment =

- Active: September 14, 1862 - June 22, 1865
- Country: United States
- Allegiance: Union
- Branch: Infantry
- Engagements: Battle of Cold Harbor; Battle of Drewry's Bluff; Battle of Chaffin's Farm; Battle of Fair Oaks

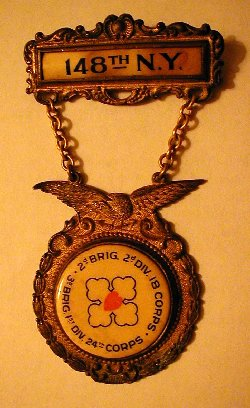
Medal issued for the 148th NYVI Reunion

The 148th New York Infantry Regiment was authorized to recruit from the 26th Senatorial District of the State. They were organized at Geneva, Ontario County and mustered in under the command of Colonel William Johnson on September 14, 1862, for a term of service of three years. The 148th served in the Department of Virginia through June 1865 and mustered out June 22, 1865, then under the command of Colonel John B. Murray. During its service the regiment lost by death, killed in action, 2 officers, 63 enlisted men; of wounds received in action, 2 officers, 42 enlisted men; of disease and other causes, 2 officers, 156 enlisted men; total, 6 officers, 261 enlisted men. Total lost was 267, 24 of them enlisted men who died as prisoners.

== Recruiting ==
Recruiting was begun in 1862 in the Finger Lakes area of New York. The table shows the primary areas for each company.

Company	Primary Recruiting area	Primary County
A	Seneca Falls, Canoga and Fayette of Seneca County; and Geneva,	Seneca and Ontario Counties
B	Dundee, Starkey, Barrington and Milo	Yates County
C	Phelps, Hopewell and Geneva	Ontario County
D	Geneva, Ontario County; Fayette and Varick	Ontario and Seneca Counties
E	Ovid, Lodi, Romulus and Covert	Seneca County
F	Geneva and Gorham; Rotter Center, Rushville, Penn Yan and Middlesex	Ontario and Yates Counties
G	Geneva, Naples and Canandaigua	Ontario County
H	Waterloo, Seneca Falls and Tyre	Seneca County
I	Benton, Milo, Jerusalem, Torrey, Branchport; Geneva and Seneca in Ontario	Yates and Ontario Counties
K	Manchester, Bristol, East and West Bloomfield and Hopewell	Ontario County

== Service ==
=== Battle of Drewry's Bluff ===
In May, 1864, when the unit was in the 2nd (Stedman's) Brigade, 2nd (Weitzel's) Division of the 18th Corps, it took part in the short campaign of the Army of the James under Gen. Butler against Petersburg and Richmond by way of the James River, being engaged at Swift Creek, Proctor's Creek, Drewry's Bluff and Bermuda Hundred. Its loss during this campaign was 78 in killed, wounded and missing.

=== Battle of Cold Harbor ===
From June 1 to 12, 1864, the 148th was heavily engaged at Cold Harbor, losing 124 killed, wounded and missing. The regiment lost 22 men killed, 2 officers and 12 men mortally wounded, an officer and 85 men wounded and 2 men missing.

=== Battle of Chaffin's Farm ===
New Market Heights

The regiment lost 6 men killed or mortally wounded and 18 men wounded. Corporal E. Van Winkle and privates Henry S. Wells and George A. Buchanan earned the Medal of Honor for their actions at Fort Harrison

=== Battle of Fair Oaks ===
In October 1864 it was heavily engaged on the old battlefield of Fair Oaks, where it lost 84 killed, wounded and missing. Battle of Fair Oaks

The regiment lost 1 officer and 4 men killed or mortally wounded, 1 officer and 12 men wounded and 1 officer and 65 men captured or missing.

== Awards ==
Corporal E. Van Winkle and Privates Henry S. Wells and George A. Buchanan distinguished themselves at Fort Harrison and were the recipients of the Medal of Honor from the War Department.

== Casualties ==
It lost by death during its term of service 4 officers and 95 men killed and mortally wounded; 2 officers and 156 men died of disease and other causes, a total of 267.

== Reunions ==
The unit mustered out on June 22, 1865, at Richmond, Virginia, under command of Col. Murray and those left with time to serve were transferred to the 100th New York Infantry.

The 148th created a reunion medal that was provided to each member. They engraved the name of the individual and their service dates on the back.
