= 6th United States Colored Infantry Regiment =

African American Union Army infantry regiment

- Active: July 28, 1863 – September 20, 1865
- Country: United States
- Branch: Army
- Type: Infantry
- Part of: 2nd Brigade, XVIII Corps (January 1864 – April 1864) 2nd Brigade, Hincks' Colored Division, XVIII Corps, Army of the James (April 1864 – June 1864) 2nd Brigade, 3rd Division, XVIII Corps (June 1864 – August 1864) 3rd Brigade, 3rd Division, XVIII Corps (August 1864 – December 1864) 2nd Brigade, 1st Division, XXV Corps (December 1864) 2nd Brigade, 3rd Division, XXV Corps (December 1864 – March 1865) 3rd Brigade, 3rd Division, X Corps (March 1865 – August 1865)
- Engagements: American Civil War

Commanders
- Notable commanders: Col. John W. Ames

The 6th United States Colored Infantry Regiment was an African American unit of the Union Army during the American Civil War. A part of the United States Colored Troops, the regiment saw action in Virginia as part of the Richmond–Petersburg Campaign and in North Carolina, where it participated in the attacks on Fort Fisher and Wilmington and the Carolinas campaign.

== History ==
After a month and a half of organization, from July 28 to September 12, 1863, at Camp William Penn, Pennsylvania, the 6th Regiment was sent to Fort Monroe, Virginia, on October 14, 1863, and from there to Yorktown, Virginia, where it remained until April 1864. While at Yorktown, the unit was involved in several expeditions as part of the XVIII Corps: Wild's Expedition to South Mills and Camden Court House, North Carolina, from December 5 to December 24, 1863, Wistar's Expedition against Richmond from February 2 to February 6, 1864, an expedition to New Kent Court House in aid of Brigadier General Hugh Judson Kilpatrick's cavalry from March 1 to March 4 (including action at New Kent Court House on March 2 and at Williamsburg on March 4), an expedition into King and Queen County from March 9 to March 12, and an expedition into Mathews County from March 17 to March 21.

Starting on May 4, 1864, the 6th Regiment participated in Brigadier General Benjamin F. Butler's operations on the south side of the James River and against Petersburg and Richmond. The unit was involved in the capture of City Point, Virginia, on May 4 and while in the city served fatigue duty, built Fort Converse on the Appomattox River, and defended an attack against Fort Converse on May 20.

The unit participated in action at Bailor's Farm on June 15, 1864, before taking part in the Richmond–Petersburg Campaign until December 17. The 6th served in the trenches around Petersburg up to June 18 and then did fatigue duty at Dutch Gap Canal until August 27, 1864. From there, the regiment moved to Deep Bottom and later participated in heavy action during the Battle of Chaffin's Farm at Fort Harrison on September 29 and September 30. After taking part in the Battle of Fair Oaks from October 27 to October 28, the unit returned to the trenches, this time near Richmond, where it remained until December 1864.

In December the unit was assigned to the newly formed XXV Corps and took part in the failed attack on Fort Fisher, North Carolina, from December 7 to December 27, 1864, and the successful Second Battle of Fort Fisher from January 7 to January 15, 1865, including the bombardment of the fort starting on the 13th and the final assault and capture on the 15th. The 6th then saw action at Sugar Loaf Hill on January 19 and at Sugar Loaf Battery on February 11 before taking part in the Battle of Wilmington at Fort Anderson from February 18 to February 20 and the capture of Wilmington as well as action at Northeast Ferry on February 22, 1865.

In March 1865, the 6th Regiment was reassigned to the X Corps and took part in General William Tecumseh Sherman's Carolinas campaign. The unit saw action during the advance on Kinston and Goldsboro, North Carolina, starting on March 6 and occupied Goldsboro after its capture on March 21. The regiment saw further action at Cox's Bridge on March 23 and March 24 and participated in the advance on Raleigh, North Carolina, starting on April 9 and the occupation of Raleigh after the city's fall on April 14. With the end of the war at hand, the men of the 6th witnessed the surrender of Confederate General Joseph E. Johnston and his army at Bennett Place, North Carolina, on April 26, 1865. The unit served out the rest of its term in the Department of North Carolina.

The 6th was mustered out on September 20, 1865, after two years of existence. The regiment lost a total of 224 men during its service; eight officers and 79 enlisted men were killed or mortally wounded and five officers and 132 enlisted men died of disease.

== Medals of Honor ==
Two African American enlisted men and one white officer of the 6th U.S. Colored Infantry were awarded the Medal of Honor for gallantry at the Battle of Chaffin's Farm.

- Lieutenant Nathan H. Edgerton
- Sergeant Major Thomas R. Hawkins
- First Sergeant Alexander Kelly

The three men's courage at New Market Heights is depicted in a painting, Three Medals of Honor by artist Don Troiani. The painting was scheduled to be unveiled June 24, 2013, at the Union League of Philadelphia.

== See also ==
- List of United States Colored Troops Civil War Units
- The Remarkable Life of a Quaker Civil War Hero
