= Edward Van Winkle =

Edward Van Winkle (c. 1839 – July 30, 1891) was an American soldier who fought in the Union Army during the American Civil War and was a recipient of the Medal of Honor.

Also known as Edwin, he was born in Phelps, New York. He fought as Corporal in the 148th New York Volunteer Infantry. He earned his medal on September 29, 1864, at the Battle of Chaffin's Farm, Virginia. He is buried in Oak Hill Cemetery, Battle Creek, Michigan.

== Medal of Honor Citation ==
Took position in advance of the skirmish line and drove the enemy's cannoneers from their guns.
