= Cecil Clay =

US Army general and Civil War Medal of Honor recipient (1842–1903)

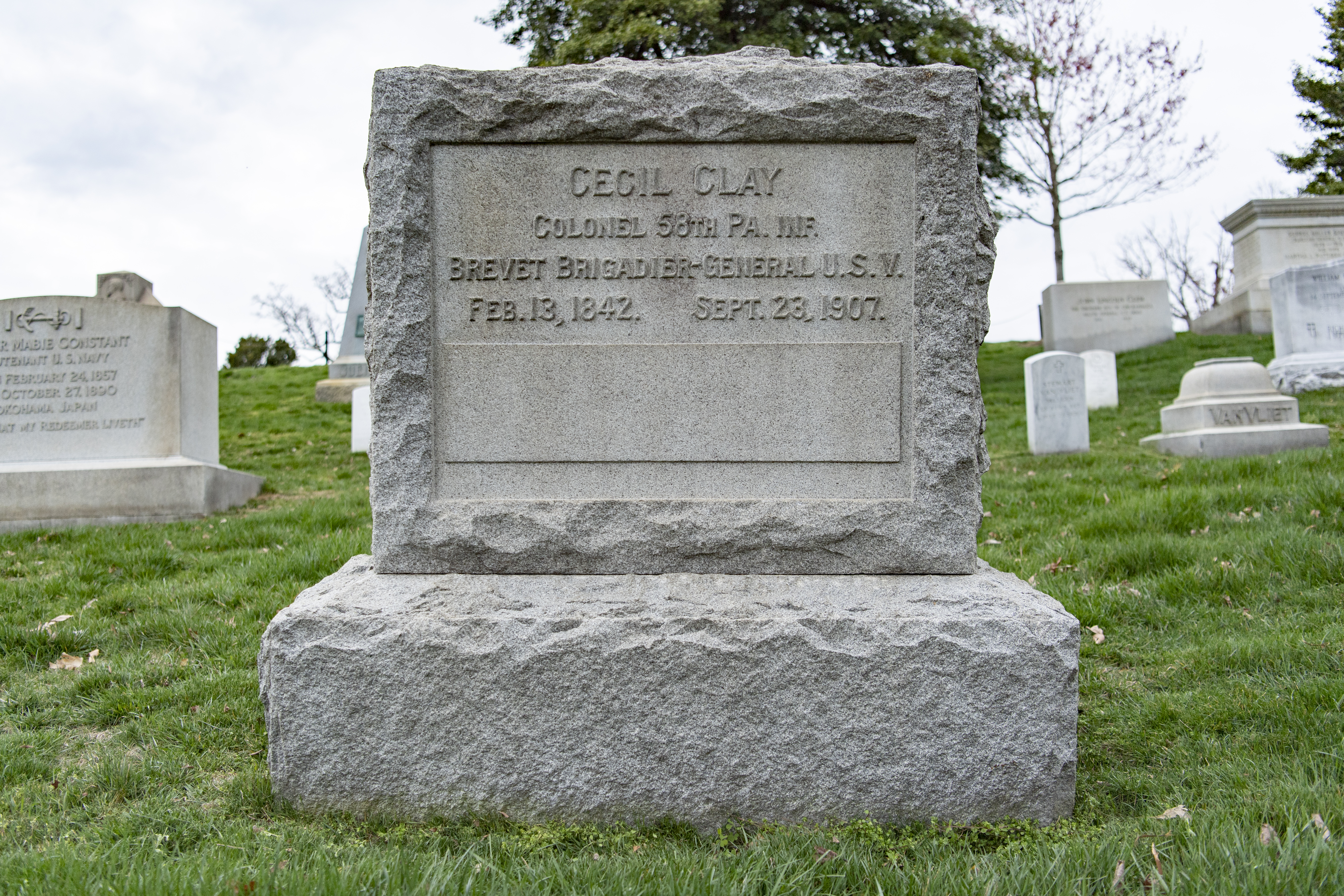
- Grave at Arlington National Cemetery
- Born: February 13, 1842; Philadelphia, Pennsylvania
- Died: September 23, 1907 (aged 65); Washington, D.C.
- Burial place: Arlington National Cemetery
- Education: University of Pennsylvania
- Relatives: Joseph Clay (grandfather); John Randolph Clay (uncle)
- Military career
- Allegiance: United States of America
- Branch: United States Army; District of Columbia National Guard
- Service years: 1861–1866 (Army); 1887–1897 (National Guard)
- Rank: Lieutenant Colonel; Brevet Brigadier General; Colonel (National Guard)
- Unit: 58th Regiment, Pennsylvania Volunteer Infantry
- Conflicts: American Civil War
- Awards: Medal of Honor
- Other work: Lumber merchant; chief clerk, United States Department of Justice

Cecil Clay (February 13, 1842 – September 23, 1907) was captain of Company K in the 58th Pennsylvania Volunteer Infantry Regiment in the Union Army during the American Civil War. He performed gallantly while wounded, earning the Medal of Honor for his actions during the assault and capture of Fort Harrison, Virginia in the Confederate defenses of Richmond, Virginia, on September 29, 1864. He was later chief clerk of the United States Department of Justice.

== Early life ==
Clay was born in Philadelphia, Pennsylvania, on February 13, 1842. As an undergraduate at the University of Pennsylvania, he joined the fraternity St. Anthony Hall.

== Civil war ==
Clay was first lieutenant on September 1, 1861, and captain on January 1, 1862, of company K of the 58th Regiment, Pennsylvania Volunteer Infantry. He was promoted to Major on September 30, 1864, and to Lieutenant Colonel on November 19, 1864.

Clay earned the Medal of Honor while serving with the 58th Pennsylvania on September 29, 1864, at Fort Harrison, Virginia, where he was wounded in action, losing his right arm and severely wounded in the left arm while leading a charge, carrying the colors of another regiment. The medal was actually issued on April 19, 1892.

Clay was mustered out of the volunteer service on January 24, 1866. On February 24, 1866, President Andrew Johnson nominated Clay for appointment to the brevet grade of brigadier general of volunteers, to rank from March 13, 1865, and the U.S. Senate confirmed the appointment on April 10, 1866.

== Later life ==
After the war, Clay became a lumber merchant. He was President of the St. Lawrence Boom and Manufacturing Company in 1870. From 1883 to 1903, he was chief clerk and general Agent, United States Department of Justice. He was a colonel in the 2nd [regiment] D.C. National Guard, 1887–1897. He also was President, Board of Reform School, Washington, D.C.

He was elected Companion No. 00149 in the Military Order of the Loyal Legion of the United States (MOLLUS), through the Commandery of Pennsylvania, on February 7, 1866. He later became a charter member of the Commandery of the District of Columbia, when it formed in 1882. The MOLLUS was the first post-Civil War veterans' organization, founded by and for commissioned officers of the Union armed forces.

== Medal of Honor citation ==
Rank and organization: Captain, Company K, 58th Pennsylvania Infantry. Place and date: At Fort Harrison, Va., September 29, 1864. Entered service at:––––––. Birth: Philadelphia, Pa. Date of issue: April 19, 1892.

Citation:

Led his regiment in the charge, carrying the colors of another regiment, and when severely wounded in the right arm, incurring loss of same, he shifted the colors to the left hand, which also became disabled by a gunshot wound.

== Death ==
Clay died September 23, 1907, at Washington, D.C. He is buried at Arlington National Cemetery, Virginia.

== See also ==
- List of Medal of Honor recipients
- List of American Civil War Medal of Honor recipients: A–F

== Notes ==
References

- Eicher, John H., and David J. Eicher. Civil War High Commands. Stanford, CA: Stanford University Press, 2001. ISBN 0-8047-3641-3.
- "Register of the Commandery of the State of Pennsylvania, April 15, 1865 – September 1, 1902". Philadelphia, 1902.
