= Thomas Belcher =

- Born: c. 1834; Bangor, Maine
- Died: May 22, 1898; Augusta, Maine
- Burial place: Togus, Maine
- Military career
- Allegiance: United States of America
- Branch: United States Army
- Rank: Private
- Unit: 9th Regiment Maine Volunteer Infantry
- Conflicts: Battle of Chaffin's Farm
- Awards: Medal of Honor

Private Thomas Belcher (c. 1834 – May 22, 1898) was an American soldier who fought in the American Civil War. Belcher was awarded the country's highest award for bravery during combat, the Medal of Honor, for his action during the Battle of Chaffin's Farm in Virginia on 29 September 1864. He was honored with the award on 6 April 1865.

Belcher died on 22 May 1898 and is believed to be buried in Togus, Maine.

== Medal of Honor citation ==
Took a guidon from the hands of the bearer, mortally wounded, and advanced with it nearer to the battery than any other man.

== See also ==
- List of American Civil War Medal of Honor recipients: A–F
