= William Laing (Medal of Honor) =

American soldier (circa 1831-1864)

- Civil War era Army Medal of Honor
- Born: c. 1831; Hempstead, New York
- Died: September 29, 1864 (aged 32–33); Chaffin's Bluff, Henrico County, Virginia
- Military career
- Allegiance: United States of America; Union
- Branch: United States Army; Union Army
- Service years: 1862 - 1864
- Rank: Sergeant
- Units: (New York (state)) Company F, 158th New York Volunteer Infantry Regiment
- Conflicts: American Civil War
- Awards: Medal of Honor

William Laing (c. 1831 – September 29, 1864) was a soldier in the Union Army and a Medal of Honor recipient for his role in the American Civil War.

Laing enlisted in the Army from Brooklyn in August 1862.

== Medal of Honor citation ==
Rank and organization: Sergeant, Company F, 158th New York Infantry. Place and date: At the Battle of Chaffin's Farm, Va., September 29, 1864. Entered service at New York City, N.Y. Birth: Hempstead, N.Y. Date of issue: April 6, 1865.

Citation:

Was among the first to scale the parapet.

== See also ==
- List of American Civil War Medal of Honor recipients: G–L
