= 58th Pennsylvania Infantry Regiment =

Union Army infantry regiment

58th Regiment, Pennsylvania Volunteer Infantry
- Pennsylvania flag
- Active: February 13, 1862 – January 26, 1866
- Country: United States
- Allegiance: Union
- Branch: Infantry
- Engagements: Battle of Drewry's Bluff; Battle of Cold Harbor; Battle of Chaffin's Farm

The 58th Regiment, Pennsylvania Volunteer Infantry was an infantry regiment which served in the Union Army during the American Civil War.

== History ==
The 58th Pennsylvania was recruited during August and September 1861. The Army had originally planned to raise an additional regiment, the 114th, but failed to raise the required number of men. The companies were from the following counties:
Company A Philadelphia
Company B Philadelphia – Captained by Theodore Blakeley
Company C Philadelphia – Captained by Daniel Linn
Company D Philadelphia – Captained by Newton R. Bunker
Company E McKean, Erie, and Tioga Counties – Captained by John C. Backus and Philetus M. Fuller
Company F McKean, Erie, and Tioga Counties – Captained by Lucius Rogers and John M. Collins
Company G Clinton County – Captained by Olney V. Cotter
Company H McKean County – Captained by Asa Howe Cory
Company I Luzerne and Northumberland Counties – Captained by John Buyers
Company K Philadelphia – Captained by Cecil Clay

John Richter Jones was selected as colonel of the regiment, Carlton B. Curtis as lieutenant colonel and Montgomery Martin as major. The 58th was mustered in on February 13, 1862.

In early March, the regiment was sent to Fort Monroe. On May 10, it was attached to a force sent to capture Norfolk, Virginia. Until September, the regiment was assigned to garrison duty around Hampton Roads, and was then transferred to South Carolina. During this time, it fought only in small skirmishes and raids, losing few men. During a raid on Kinston, North Carolina, on May 21, 1863, Jones was killed. Curtis was promoted to colonel, Martin to lieutenant colonel, and Captain Henry Metcalf to major. In June, the 58th was sent to North Carolina, where it was broken up into various detachments and spread along the Pamlico River.

In late April 1864, the regiment was reassigned to the Army of the James as part of the 3rd Brigade, First Division, XVIII Corps. Other than some skirmishing during the initial advance on Richmond, Virginia, the regiment did not see much action. Along with the rest of the corps, it fought at the Battle of Cold Harbor. After the battle, the entire corps was moved to the lines in front of Petersburg, Virginia. During the Siege of Petersburg, the regiment was assigned mostly to picket, guard, and fatigue duty. It did fight in the Battle of Chaffin's Farm on September 28, 1864, where it lost six officers and 128 enlisted men.

After serving in the Appomattox Campaign, the regiment was broken up into various detachments and assigned to the lower counties of Virginia. It was mustered out at City Point, Virginia, on January 26, 1866.

58th Pennsylvania Infantry Regiment Reunion, 1914

== Reenactors ==
A group portraying the 58th Pennsylvania is based in North Branch, New York. website is https://web.archive.org/web/20071206200535/http://www.angelfire.com/ny5/58thpa/58thpa.html

== Casualties ==
- Killed and mortally wounded: 6 officers, 68 enlisted men
- Wounded: ? officers, ? enlisted men
- Died of disease: 4 officers, 139 enlisted men
- Captured or missing: ? officers, ? enlisted men
- Total: ? officers, ? enlisted men

== See also ==
- List of Pennsylvania Civil War Units
