= Asa Howe Cory =

American Civil War captain and newspaper publisher

Captain Asa Howe Cory
- Born: May 31, 1814; Sullivan Township, Pennsylvania, U.S.
- Died: June 6, 1892 (aged 78); Coryville, Pennsylvania, U.S.
- Occupations: Captain, Newspaper Publisher, Postmaster
- Known for: Being an American Civil War captain, Publisher of newspapers
- Spouse: Lucy Holmes
- Children: Asa Orson Cory, Nancy Cory, Ella Camilla Cory
- Parent(s): Thomas Robbins Cory, Leytta Howe

Asa Howe Cory (May 31, 1814 – June 6, 1892) was a captain of Company H in the 58th Pennsylvania Volunteer Infantry Regiment in the Union Army during the American Civil War.

== Early life ==
Asa Howe Cory was born in Sullivan Township, Pennsylvania. He attended the public schools.

Began his career in Wellsboro, Pennsylvania, where he published "The Phoenix" for a period of two years. He went to Smethport, Pennsylvania, and purchased "The McKean County Journal" and in 1837 changed its name to "The Beacon". He published that for three years before selling it to J.B. Oviatt.

Was elected as Road Commissioner in Smethport, Pennsylvania, in 1848.

== Civil war ==
In 1861, he raised company H for the 58th Pennsylvania Volunteer Infantry Regiment and became its captain. Served with the Union Army from October 1, 1861, until he was forced by severe frostbite to resign on August 21, 1862.

== Post bellum ==
Was chosen as Postmaster of Coryville, Pennsylvania.
