= George A. Buchanan =

- Born: 1842; Victor, New York
- Died: October 2, 1864 (aged 21–22); Virginia
- Military career
- Allegiance: United States of America
- Branch: United States Army; Union Army
- Service years: 1862 - 1864
- Rank: Private
- Unit: (New York (state)) 148th Regiment New York Volunteer Infantry
- Conflicts: Battle of Chaffin's Farm
- Awards: Medal of Honor

George A. Buchanan (1842 – October 2, 1864) was an American soldier who received the Medal of Honor for valor during the American Civil War.

== Biography ==
Buchanan enlisted in the Army from Canandaigua, New York in September 1862. He served with the 148th New York Infantry, and was wounded at the Battle of Cold Harbor. He was killed in action on October 2, 1864. He was posthumously awarded the Medal of Honor on April 6, 1865, for his actions at the Battle of Chaffin's Farm.

== Medal of Honor citation ==
Citation:

Took position in advance of the skirmish line and drove the enemy's cannoneers from their guns; was mortally wounded.

== See also ==
- List of American Civil War Medal of Honor recipients: A-F
