= Joseph H. Shea =

Soldier and veteran of the American Civil War

- Born: January 22, 1847; Baltimore, Maryland
- Died: December 12, 1937 (aged 90); Columbia County, Arkansas
- Military career
- Allegiance: United States of America
- Branch: United States Army; Union Army
- Rank: Private
- Unit: 92nd New York Volunteer Infantry
- Conflicts: Battle of Chaffin's Farm
- Awards: Medal of Honor

Joseph Henry Shea (January 22, 1847 – December 12, 1937) was an American soldier who fought for the Union Army during the American Civil War. He received the Medal of Honor for valor.

== Biography ==
Shea joined the 92nd New York Volunteer Infantry in January 1863. He received the Medal of Honor in March 1866 for his actions at the Battle of Chaffin's Farm on September 29, 1864. He was transferred to the 96th New York Volunteer Infantry in December 1864, and was mustered out in January 1866.

== Medal of Honor citation ==
Citation:

Gallantry in bringing wounded from the field under heavy fire."

== See also ==
- List of American Civil War Medal of Honor recipients: Q-S
