= Fort Harrison =

American Civil War era Confederate fort

Coordinates: 37°25′40″N 77°22′24″W

Fort Harrison (Confederate States of America) Fort Burnham (United States)
- Part of Richmond Defenses
- Near Richmond, Virginia in United States
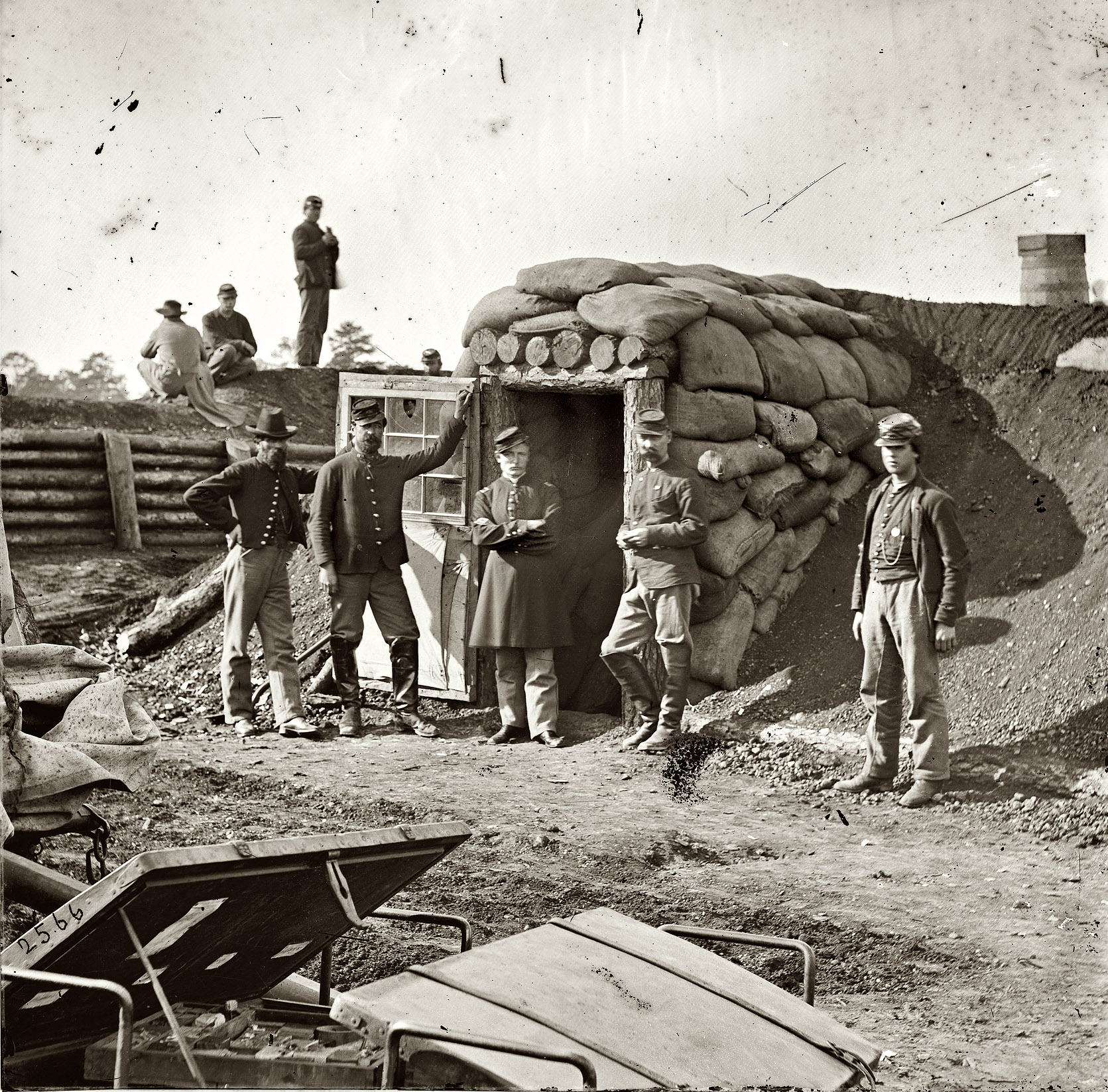
- Fort Harrison after being taken by Union soldiers and renamed Fort Burnham

Site information
- Controlled by: Confederate States of America (1861–1864) (United States) Union Army (1864–)

Fort Harrison, later renamed Fort Burnham, was an important component of the Confederate defenses of Richmond during the American Civil War. Named after Lieutenant William Harrison, a Confederate engineer, it was the largest in the series of fortifications that extended from New Market Road to the James River that also included Forts Brady, Hoke, Johnson, Gregg, and Gilmer. These earthworks were designed to protect the strategically important Chaffin's Bluff on the James.

On September 29, 1864, 2,500 Union soldiers from Major General Benjamin Butler's Army of the James overran Major Richard Cornelius Taylor's 200-man Confederate garrison and captured the fort in the Battle of Chaffin's Farm. Brigadier General Hiram Burnham, a native of Maine and a brigade commander in XVIII Corps, was killed in the assault, and the Union-held fort was renamed Fort Burnham in his honor.

Although the attacks of September 29 had succeeded in capturing only Fort Harrison, General Robert E. Lee saw the potential threat to Richmond and ordered a counterattack on September 30. The attack failed, but Brigadier General George J. Stannard lost an arm while resisting Lee's assault. This failure forced the Confederates to realign their defenses farther west. Fort Burnham remained in Union hands until the end of the war.

In 1930, members of the Richmond Parks Corporation, a local preservation society, constructed a log cabin on the site to serve as their headquarters. Today, this building serves as the Fort Harrison visitor center, part of Richmond National Battlefield Park.

On September 22, 2014, park staff at Richmond National Battlefield Park discovered an artillery shell within the moat of a Confederate fortification known as Fort Gilmer in the park's Fort Harrison battlefield unit. Although it did not explode, the shell was a twelve pound explosive round, possibly used by Confederates at Fort Gilmer as one of several improvised hand grenades rolled down the side of the fort against Union soldiers from the 7th United States Colored Troops.

== Gallery ==
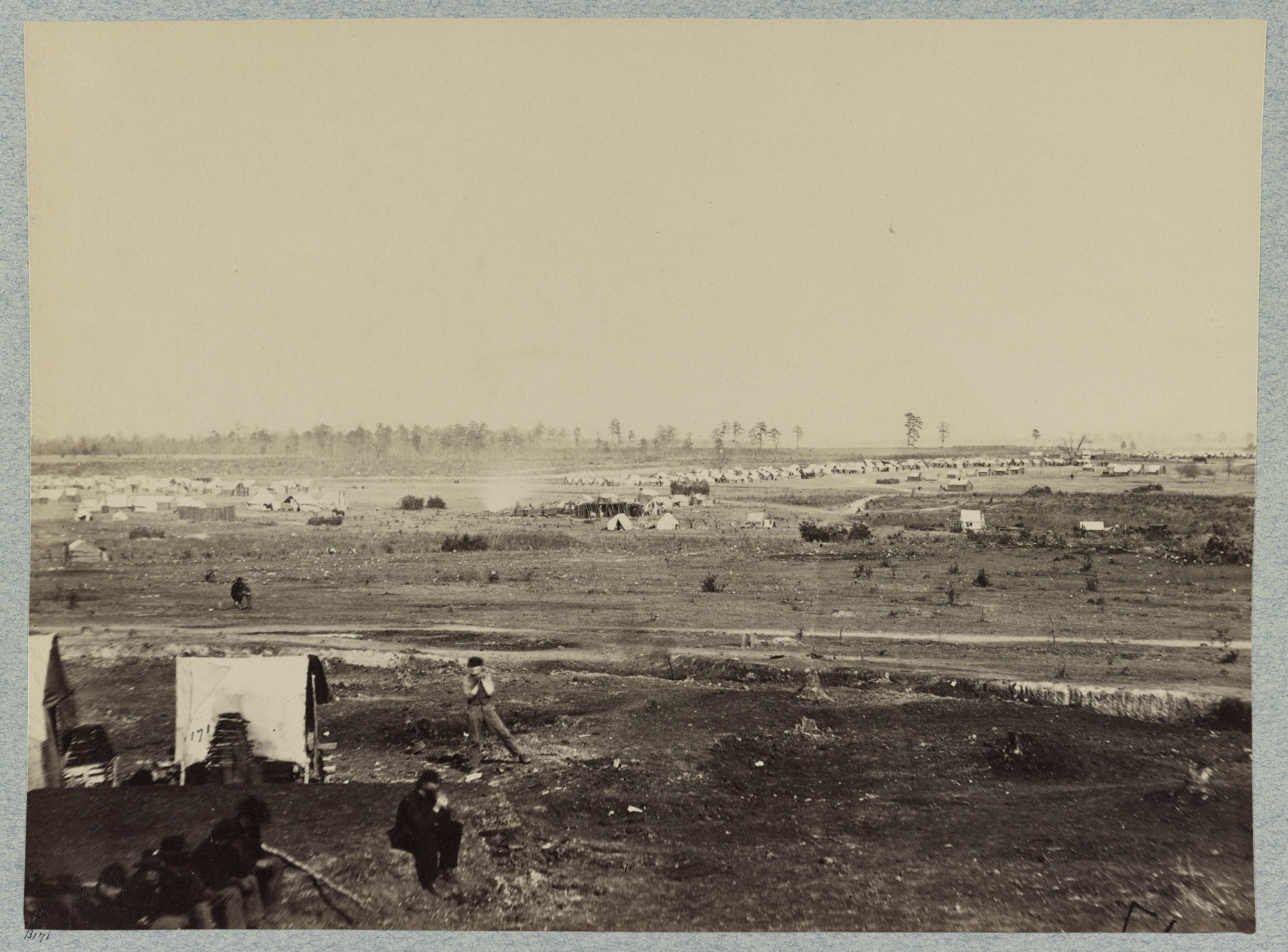
General view

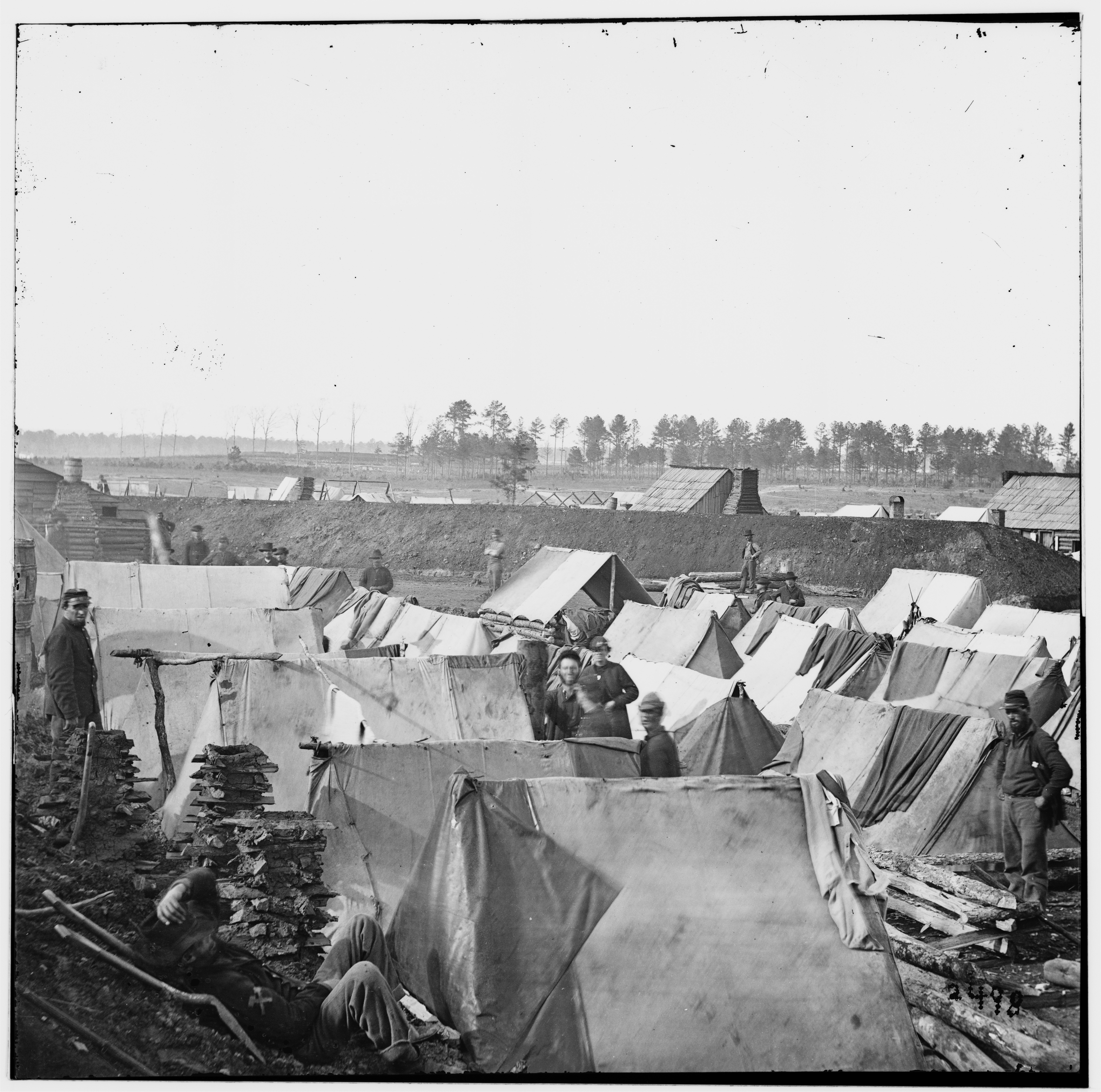
Encampment and eathworks

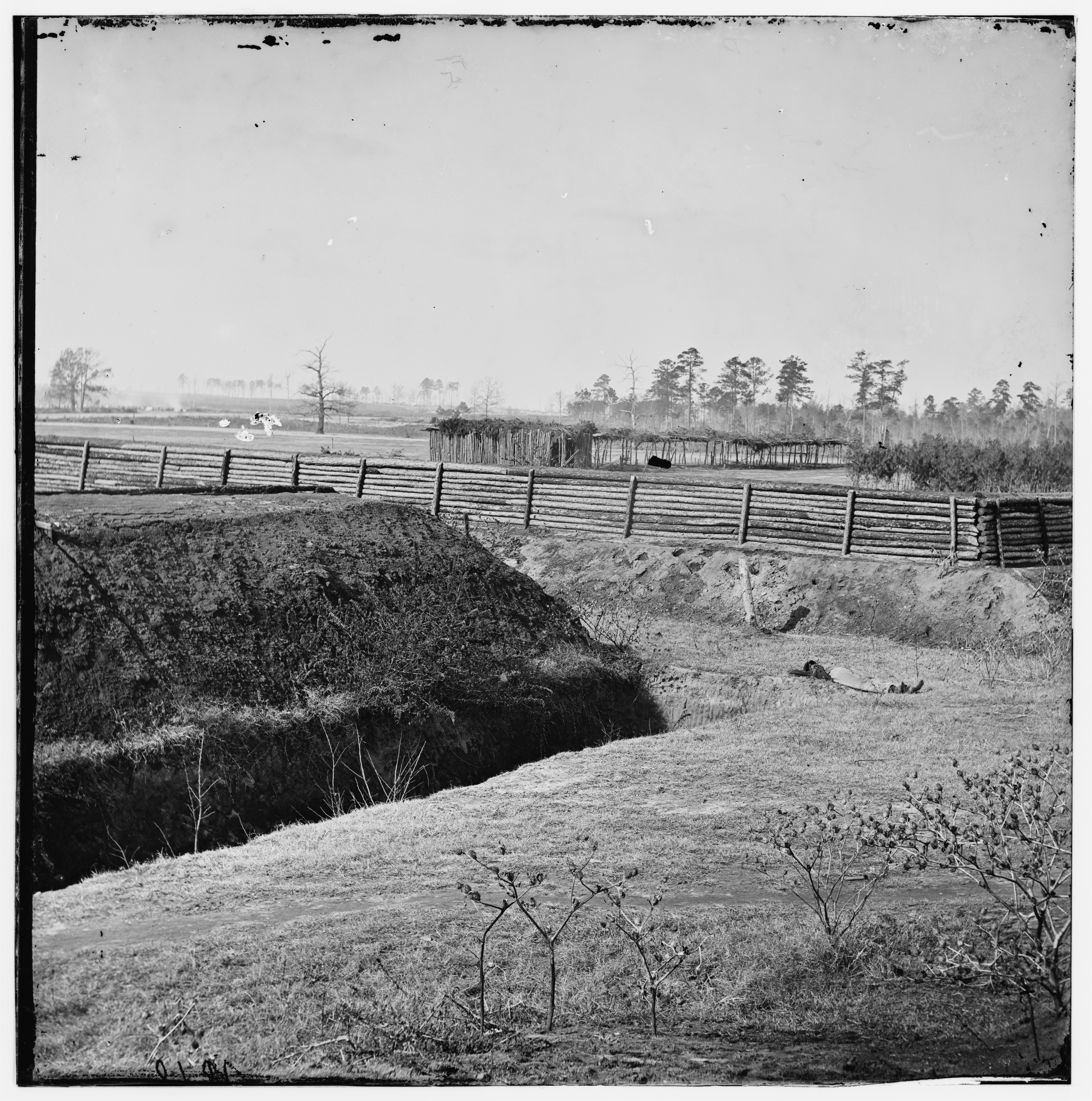
Chapin's Bluff near Fort Burnham

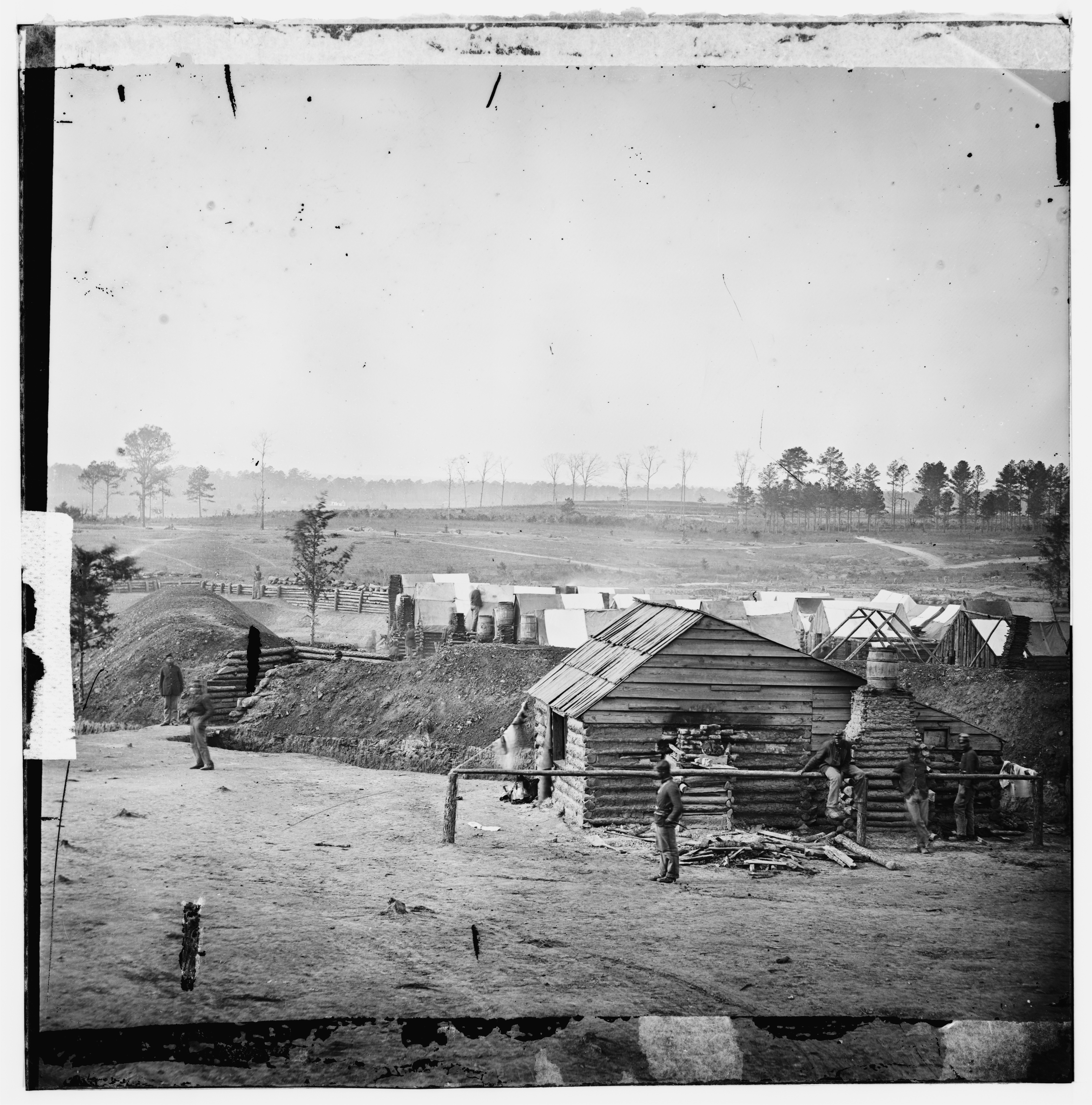
Chapin's Bluff

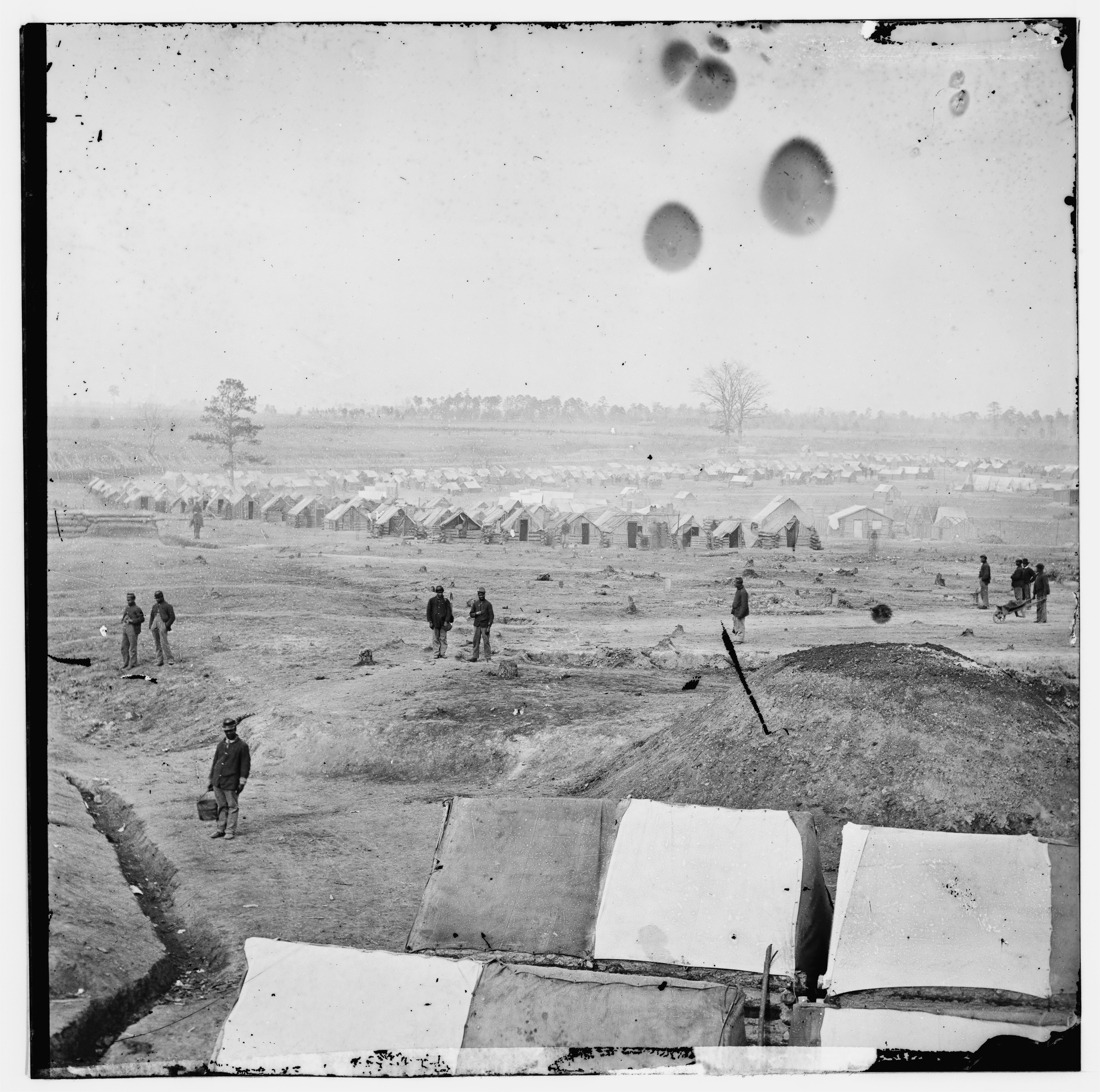
Chapin's Bluff

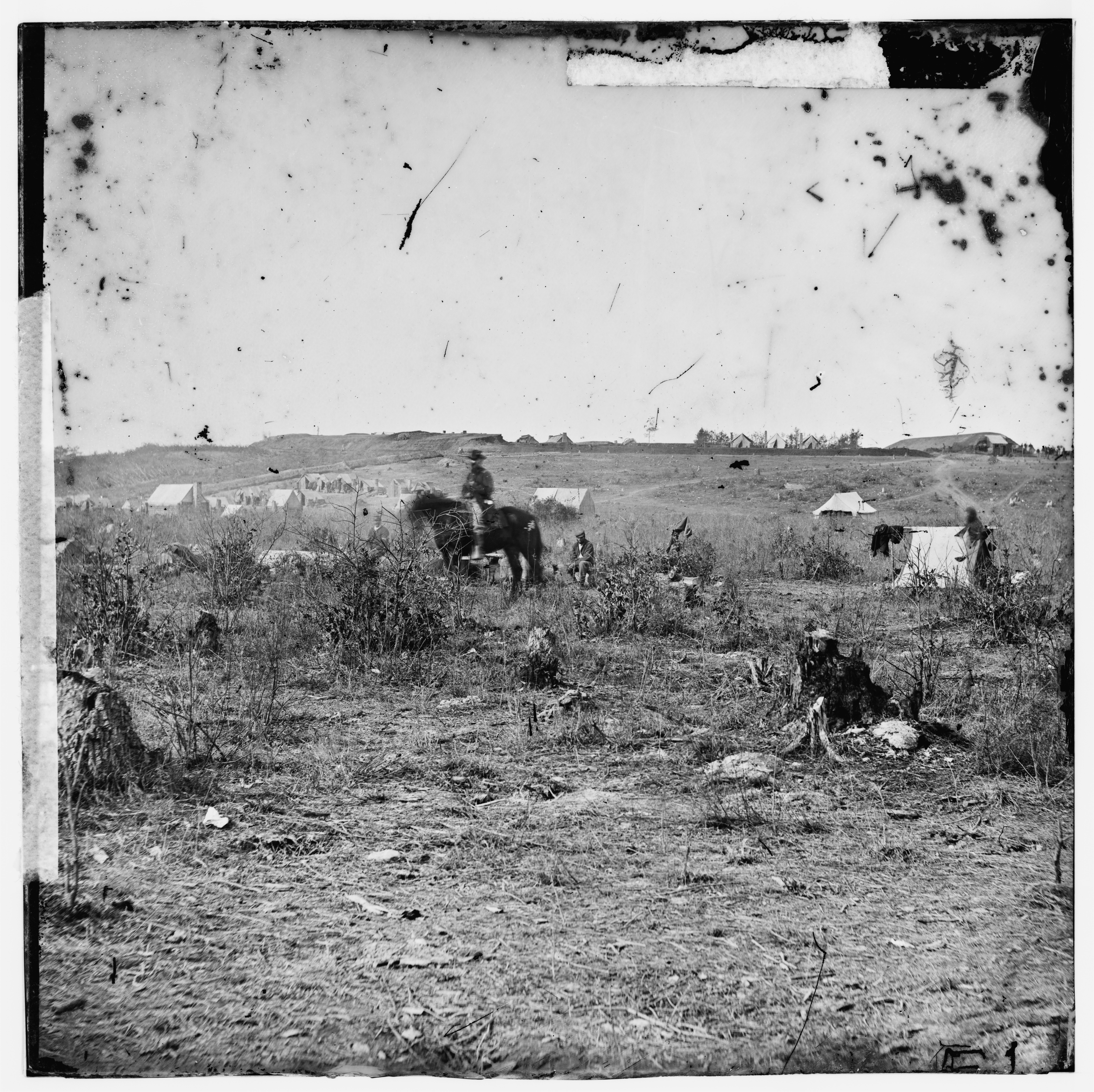
Chapin's Bluff

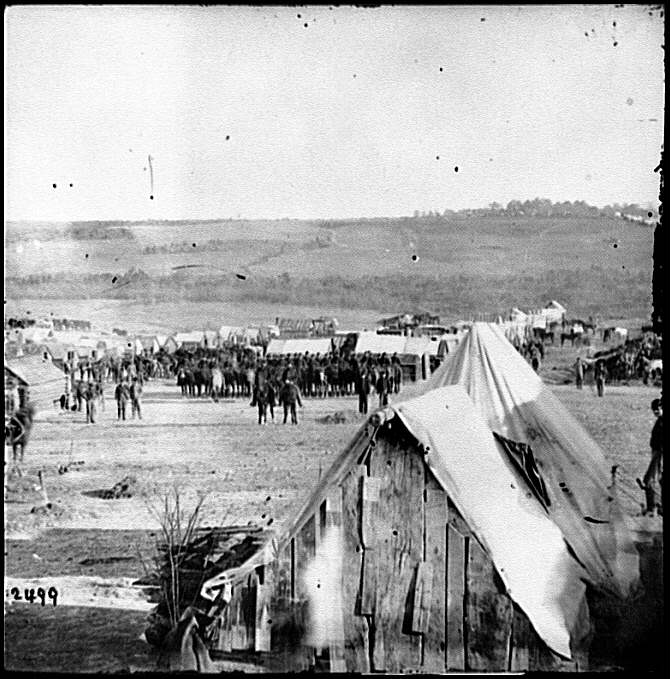
The camp of the 5th Pennsylvania Cavalry Regiment near the battlefield on October 29, 1864

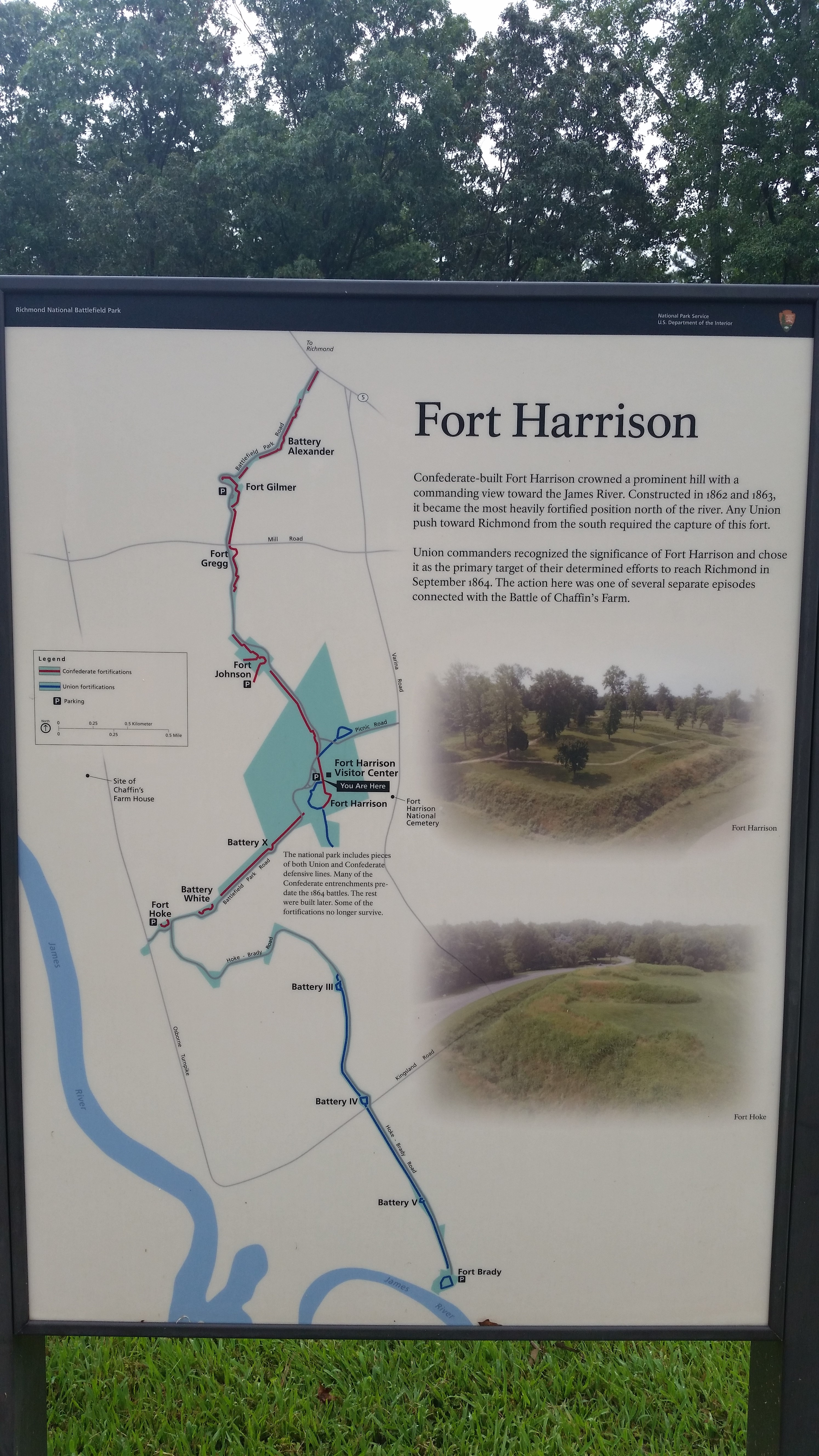
National Park Service marker for Fort Harrison

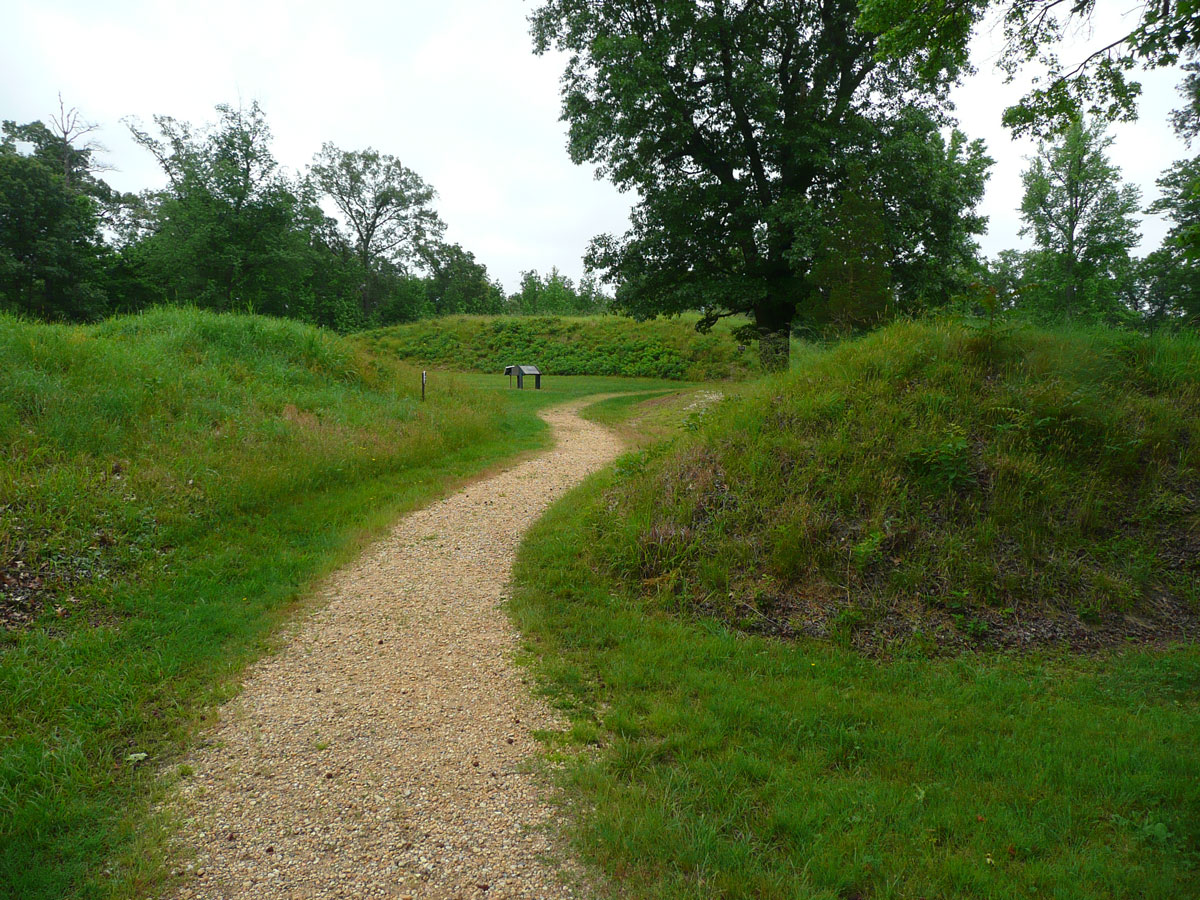
Fort Harrison interior in 2009

== Bibliography ==
- Hannings, Bud (2006). Forts of the United States: An Historical Dictionary, 16th through 19th Centuries. Jefferson, North Carolina: McFarland. ISBN 978-0-7864-1796-4.
