= Hiram Burnham =

American politician

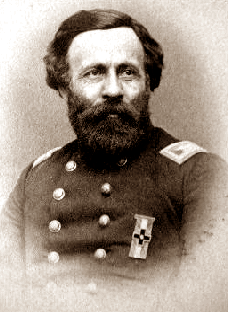
- Colonel Hiram Burnham, ca. 1862
- Born: 1814; Narraguagus, Maine, US
- Died: September 29, 1864 (aged 49–50); Richmond, Virginia, US
- Burial place: Pine Grove Cemetery, Cherryfield, Maine
- Military career
- Allegiance: United States; Union
- Branch: United States Army; Union Army
- Service years: 1861–1864
- Rank: Brigadier General
- Nickname: "Grizzly"
- Commands: 6th Maine Infantry; Light Division, VI Corps; Brigade Command, 1st Division, XVIII Corps; 1st Division, XVIII Corps
- Conflicts: Aroostook War; American Civil War; Battle of Crampton's Gap; Battle of Antietam; Battle of Fredericksburg; Second Battle of Fredericksburg; Battle of Salem Church; Battle of Chancellorsville; Battle of Gettysburg; Siege of Petersburg; Battle of Chaffin's Farm †
- Other work: Coroner, lumberman, county commissioner

Hiram Burnham (1814 – September 29, 1864) was an officer in the Union Army who commanded a regiment and then a brigade in the Eastern Theater of the American Civil War. He was killed in battle while assaulting Confederate positions near Richmond, Virginia, during the Battle of Chaffin's Farm.

== Early life and career ==
Hiram Burnham was born in Narraguagus, later Cherryfield, Maine, in 1814. He formed and led a militia company as its captain in the Aroostook War of 1839. He subsequently worked as a lumberman and owned a sawmill. Active in local politics, he held public office as a county commissioner and a coroner. Burnham is described as a burly man with a strong voice, able to make himself heard on a battlefield. He was born in Machias, Maine the son of John & Elizabeth (Libby) Burnham. He moved to Cherryfield in the early 1830s.

== Civil War ==
=== Service in the Army of the Potomac ===
Early in the war Burnham became lieutenant colonel of the 6th Maine Infantry on July 16, 1861. He was promoted to the rank of colonel on December 12 of that year. He served with the Army of the Potomac in the Peninsula Campaign, starting out in Brig. Gen. Winfield S. Hancock's brigade in a division of the IV Corps under Brig. Gen. William F. Smith. This division later became part of the VI Corps. At the Battle of Crampton's Gap and the Battle of Antietam, Burnham led his regiment in the 1st Brigade, 2nd Division, VI Corps under Hancock. He led the same regiment under Brig. Gen. Calvin E. Pratt at the Battle of Fredericksburg, where the brigade was only lightly engaged.

In 1863, a "Light Division" of VI Corps, composed of five regiments, was organized under General Pratt. It was to be able to move rapidly. Instead of wagons, supplies were to be carried on mules. However, Pratt resigned his post and Burnham led the division from May 3 to May 11, including at the Second Battle of Fredericksburg, where he was wounded, temporarily relinquishing command. The Light Division was among the first VI Corps units to cross the Rappahannock River on May 1, 1863, to draw Confederate attention away from the main crossing points of the Army of the Potomac upstream. The Light Division made up the rightmost column in Maj. Gen. John Sedgwick’s attack on Marye’s Heights on May 3. Although Burnham spoke "cheerfully" to his troops before they attacked, casualties were heavy — an estimated 30%.

Burnham's Light Division was the right flank anchor of Sedgwick's line when VI Corps stood on the defensive during the later stages of the Battle of Salem Church. Only lightly engaged, Burnham was able to send two regiments to help repel a Confederate attack on the left flank. The 6th Maine of Burnham's command was one of the rearguard units when the corps retreated across the Rappahannock River. The Light Division was dissolved after the Battle of Chancellorsville, and Burnham's regiment joined the 3rd Brigade, 1st Division, VI Corps under Brig. Gen. David Allen Russell. In that capacity he was present in reserve behind Little Round Top at the Battle of Gettysburg. A monument to the regiment stands on Howe Avenue behind the Round Top.

=== Service in the Army of the James ===
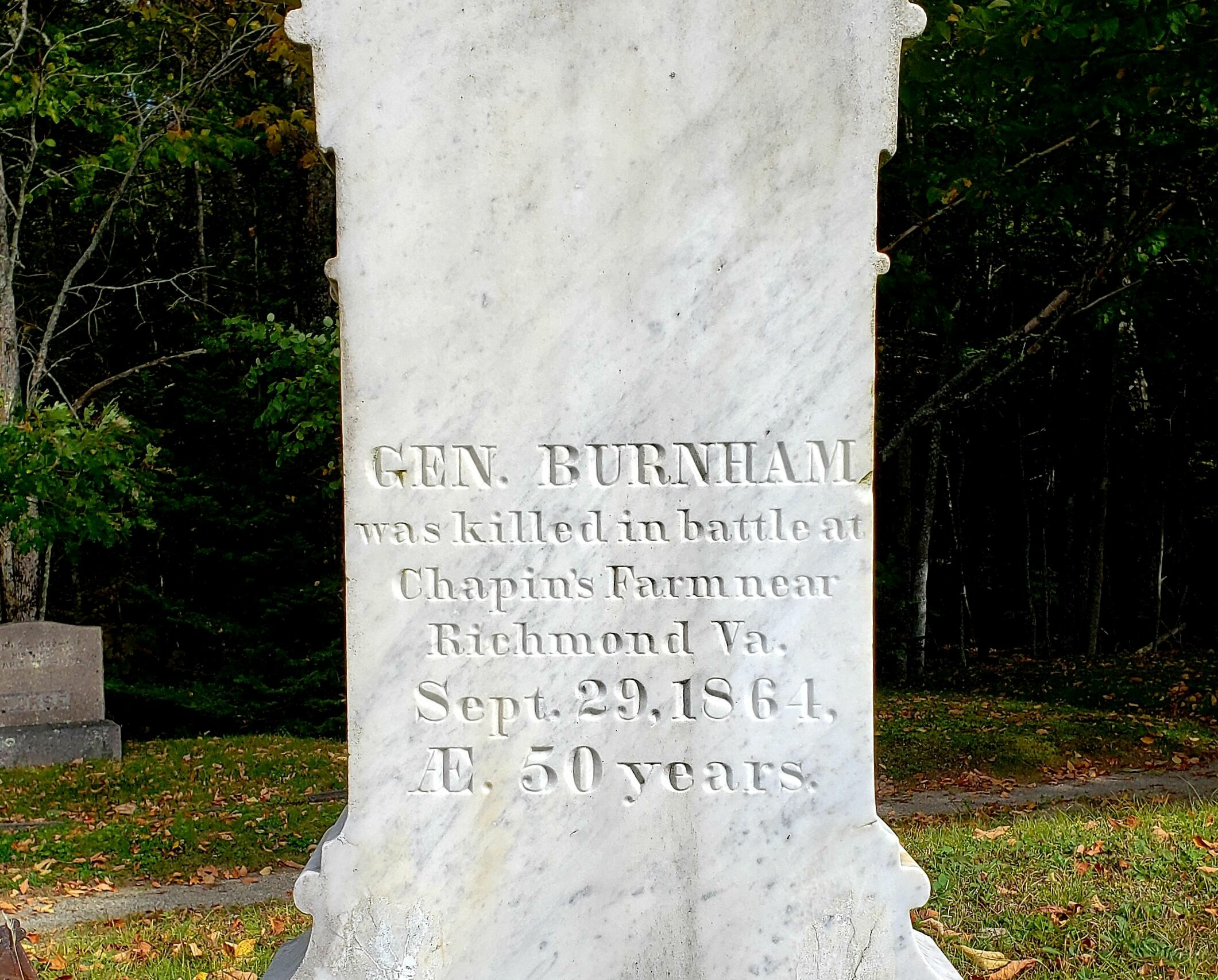

Burnham was absent from Russell's brigade at the beginning of the Overland Campaign. Having been promoted to the rank of brigadier general on April 26, 1864, he was assigned command of a brigade in the first Division of the XVIII Corps, Army of the James on April 28 of that year. General Burnham led the brigade until July 31, and then again from September 27 to September 29 during the Siege of Petersburg. He commanded the 1st Division briefly in between.

Burnham was killed at the Battle of Chaffin's Farm on September 29, 1864. His brigade had routed Confederate skirmishers from a cornfield on the Varina Road and pursued toward the Confederate earthworks. In preparation for the planned assault on Fort Harrison, the division's commander, Brig. Gen. George J. Stannard, deployed Burnham's brigade in the front of his column. Burnham was hit in the intestines by a bullet shortly after his brigade penetrated into the fort. He died shortly thereafter.

General Burnham was buried in Pine Grove Cemetery (44°35'48.75"N, 67°55'10.52"W) in Cherryfield, Maine.

The U.S. Army renamed the captured Fort Harrison as Fort Burnham in his honor.

== See also ==
- List of American Civil War generals (Union)
