= Thomas R. Hawkins =

American Union Army soldier

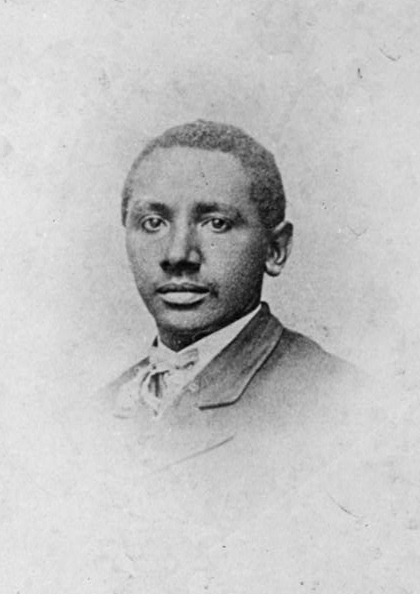
- Sergeant Major Thomas R. Hawkins
- Born: c. 1840; Cincinnati, Ohio
- Died: 1870 (aged 29–30)
- Military career
- Allegiance: United States of America; Union
- Branch: United States Army; Union Army
- Service years: 1863–1865
- Rank: Sergeant Major
- Unit: 6th United States Colored Infantry Regiment
- Conflicts: American Civil War: Battle of Chaffin's Farm
- Awards: Medal of Honor

Thomas R. Hawkins (c. 1840 – February 28, 1870) was an African-American Union Army soldier during the American Civil War and a recipient of America's highest military decoration—the Medal of Honor—for his actions at the Battle of Chaffin's Farm.

== Biography ==
Hawkins joined the army as a substitute from Philadelphia, Pennsylvania on August 4, 1863, and became sergeant major of the 6th U.S. Colored Infantry Regiment on August 23. On September 29, 1864, he fought in the Battle of Chaffin's Farm, Virginia. He was discharged in May 1865 for wounds received in action.

More than five years later, on February 8, 1870, he was awarded the Medal of Honor for "rescue of regimental colors" during that battle.

Thomas Hawkins died of cancer at age 29 or 30 on February 28, 1870, and was buried in Columbian Harmony Cemetery in Washington, D.C. His remains were moved to National Harmony Memorial Park in Landover, Maryland, in 1960 when the original cemetery closed and was sold. A memorial plaque was placed at his grave in 1997.

Hawkins' courage at New Market Heights is depicted in the painting Three Medals of Honor by artist Don Troiani, which was unveiled on June 24, 2013 at the Union League of Philadelphia.

== Medal of Honor citation ==
Rank and organization: Sergeant Major, 6th U.S. Colored Troops. Place and date: At Chapins Farm, Va., September 29, 1864. Entered service at: Philadelphia, Pa. Birth: Cincinnati, Ohio. Date of issue: February 8, 1870.

Citation:

Rescue of regimental colors.

== See also ==
- List of Medal of Honor recipients
- List of American Civil War Medal of Honor recipients: G–L
- List of African American Medal of Honor recipients
