= Battle of Chaffin's Farm =

Battle of the American Civil War

Coordinates: 37.4268°N 77.3729°W

Battle of Chaffin's Farm and New Market Heights
- Part of the American Civil War
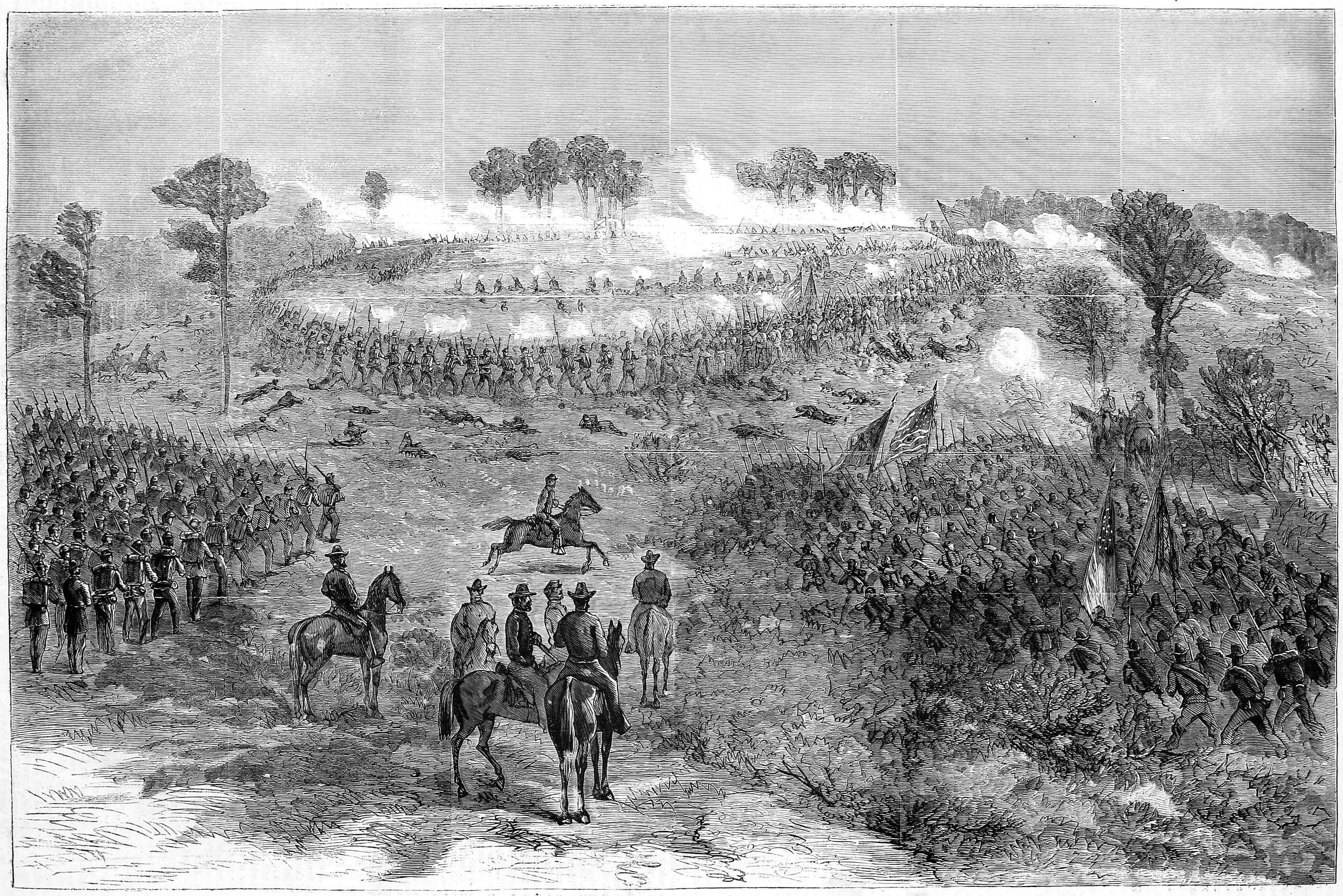
- Union assault on Fort Harrison, September 29 (after a sketch by William Waud)
Date	September 29–30, 1864
Location	Henrico County, Virginia
Result	Union victory

Belligerents
United States (Union)	Confederate States (Confederacy)

Commanders and leaders
Ulysses S. Grant; Benjamin F. Butler	Robert E. Lee; Richard S. Ewell

Strength
26,600	14,500 (Note: There were 4,500 defenders on September 29, reinforced by 10,000 on September 30.)

Casualties and losses
3,372 total 391 killed 2,317 wounded 649 missing/captured (Note: Bonekemper cites 383 killed, 2,299 wounded, and 645 missing or captured. Trudeau cites 1,040 killed or missing and 2,317 wounded. Horn, p. 167, cites 3,327 total Union casualties. Salmon estimates 4,150 Union casualties.)	2,000 total 250 killed 1,250 wounded 500 missing/captured (Note: Sommers cites 1,737 casualties, including 396 missing or captured. Horn, Trudeau, and Kennedy estimate 1,700 total Confederate casualties. Salmon estimates about 1,750 Confederate casualties, mostly on September 30.)

The Battle of Chaffin's Farm and New Market Heights, also known as Laurel Hill and combats at Forts Harrison, Johnson, and Gilmer, was fought in Virginia on September 29–30, 1864, as part of the siege of Petersburg in the American Civil War.

== Background ==
From the very beginning of the war, Confederate engineers and slave laborers had constructed permanent defenses around Richmond. By 1864, they had created a system anchored south of the capital on the James River at Chaffin's Farm, a large open area at Chaffin's Bluff, both named for a local landowner. This outer line was supported by an intermediate and inner system of fortifications much closer to the capital. In July and August 1864, these lines were tested by Union Lt. Gen. Ulysses S. Grant in offensives designed to attack simultaneously north and south of the James.

On July 27–29, the Army of the Potomac's II Corps under Maj. Gen. Winfield S. Hancock and cavalry under Maj. Gen. Philip Sheridan attacked New Market Heights and Fussell's Mill in the First Battle of Deep Bottom (named for the section of the James River used for the Union crossing). The attacks failed to break through to threaten Richmond or its railroads, but they did cause Confederate Gen. Robert E. Lee to transfer men from the Petersburg fortifications in preparation for the Battle of the Crater on July 31. The Second Battle of Deep Bottom was conducted by Hancock on August 14–20, attacking in almost the same areas once again to draw Confederate troops away from south of the James, where the Battle of Globe Tavern (also known as the Second Battle of the Weldon Railroad) was an attempt to cut the railroad supply lines to Petersburg. The second battle was also a Confederate victory, but it forced Lee to weaken his Petersburg defenses and abandon plans to reinforce his men in the Shenandoah Valley.

In late September, Grant planned another dual offensive. Historians sometimes enumerate Grant's offensives during the Richmond–Petersburg Campaign. Richard J. Sommers, John Horn, and Noah Andre Trudeau call these operations "Grant's Fifth Offensive". (Note: The first four offensives were the initial assaults on Petersburg, the Battle of Jerusalem Plank Road and the Wilson-Kautz Raid, the First Battle of Deep Bottom and the Battle of the Crater, and the Second Battle of Deep Bottom and the Battle of Globe Tavern.) Grant's primary objective was to cut the railroad supply lines to the south of Petersburg, which would likely cause the fall of both Petersburg and Richmond. He planned to use a cavalry division under Brig. Gen. David McM. Gregg and four infantry divisions from the V and IX Corps of the Army of the Potomac to sever the South Side Railroad, an operation that would result in the Battle of Peebles' Farm from September 30 to October 2. Once again hoping to distract Robert E. Lee and draw Confederate troops north of the river, Grant ordered the Army of the James under Maj. Gen. Benjamin F. Butler to attack toward Richmond.

Butler devised a plan that historian John Horn called his "best performance of the war." Rather than repeat the efforts of July and August to turn the Confederate left, Butler planned surprise attacks on the Confederate right and center. His XVIII Corps under Maj. Gen. Edward O. C. Ord, would cross the James River to Aiken's Landing by a newly constructed pontoon bridge. At the original Deep Bottom pontoon bridge, his X Corps under Maj. Gen. David B. Birney would cross, followed by his cavalry under Brig. Gen. August V. Kautz. In a two-pronged attack, the right wing (Birney's X Corps, augmented by a United States Colored Troops division under Brig. Gen. Charles J. Paine from the XVIII Corps) would assault the Confederate lines at New Market Road and drive on to capture the artillery positions behind it on New Market Heights. This action would protect the flank of the left wing (the remainder of Ord's XVIII Corps), which would attack Fort Harrison from the south-east, neutralizing the strongest point of the entire Confederate line. Then, the right wing would assist the left by attacking Fort Gregg and Fort Gilmer, both north of Fort Harrison. Kautz's cavalry would exploit Birney's capture of the New Market Road by driving for Richmond.

== Battle ==
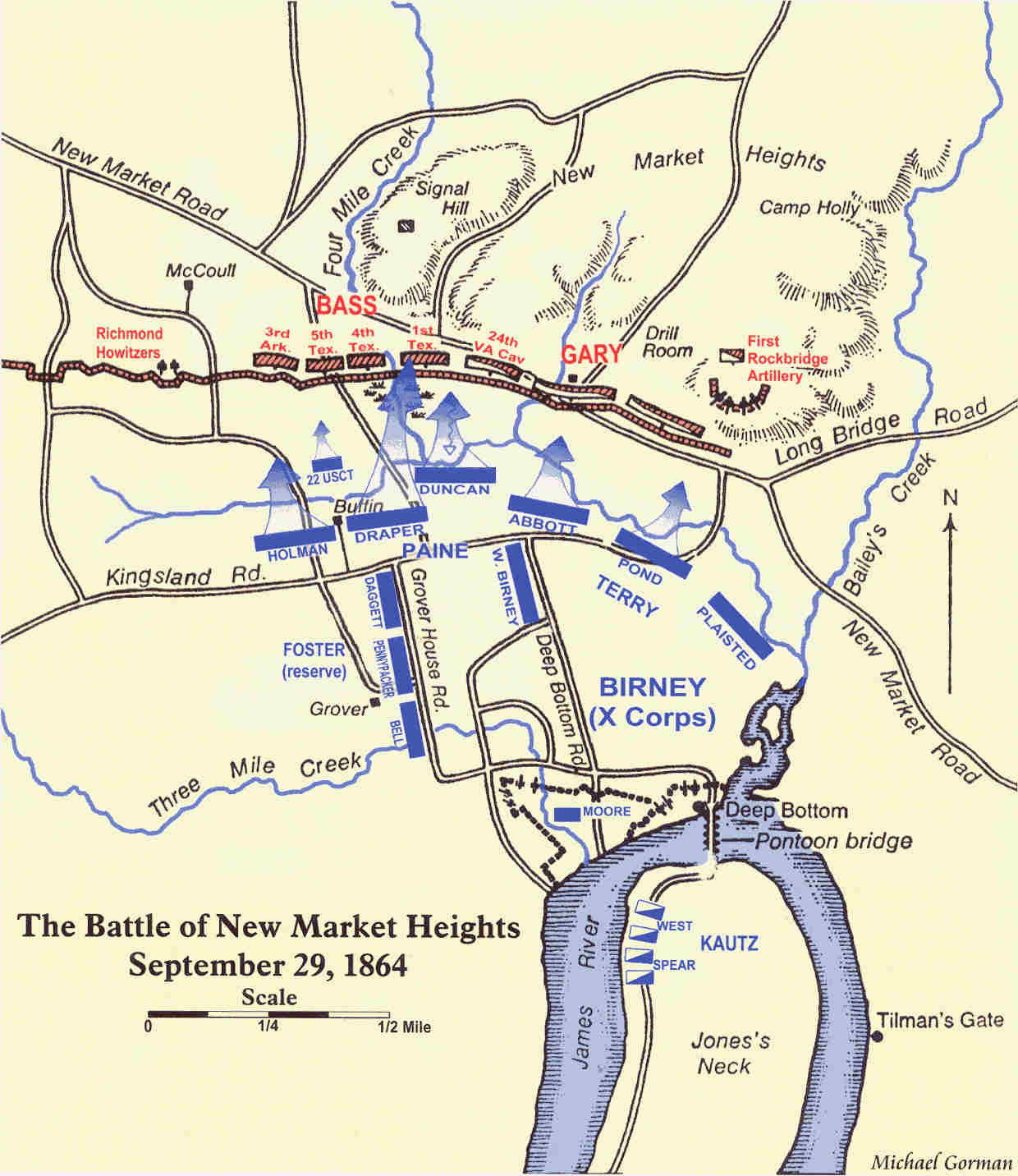
Map of the action at New Market Heights

=== New Market Heights ===
Maj. Gen. David B. Birney moved the X Corps north from the Deep Bottom bridgehead toward the Confederate works atop New Market Heights manned by Brig. Gen. John Gregg. A brigade of U.S. Colored Troops attacked the heights but was repulsed. In this attack, Christian Fleetwood's actions would later earn him the Medal of Honor. Birney reinforced the assault force and stormed the heights again. Alfred H. Terry's division managed to turn the Confederate left flank, thus turning the tide of the battle. Word of Union success against Fort Harrison then reached Gregg, compelling him to pull Confederate troops back to Forts Gregg, Gilmer and Johnson. Confederate defenders at New Market Heights were Lee's "Grenadier Guards", the First, Fourth and Fifth Texas and the Third Arkansas, numbering about 1,800 men. They inflicted 850 casualties on the attacking 13,000 Union troops while suffering only 50 casualties.

Once Birney's troops had taken New Market Heights, the X Corps turned to the north-west along the New Market Road and moved against a secondary line of works guarding Richmond north of Fort Harrison. Brig. Gen. Robert Sanford Foster's X Corps division assaulted a small salient known as Fort Gilmer. David Birney's brother, Brig. Gen. William Birney, led a brigade of U.S. Colored Troops against Fort Gregg south of Fort Gilmer. These attacks were marked by heroism among the Colored Troops but were ultimately repulsed.

=== Fort Harrison ===
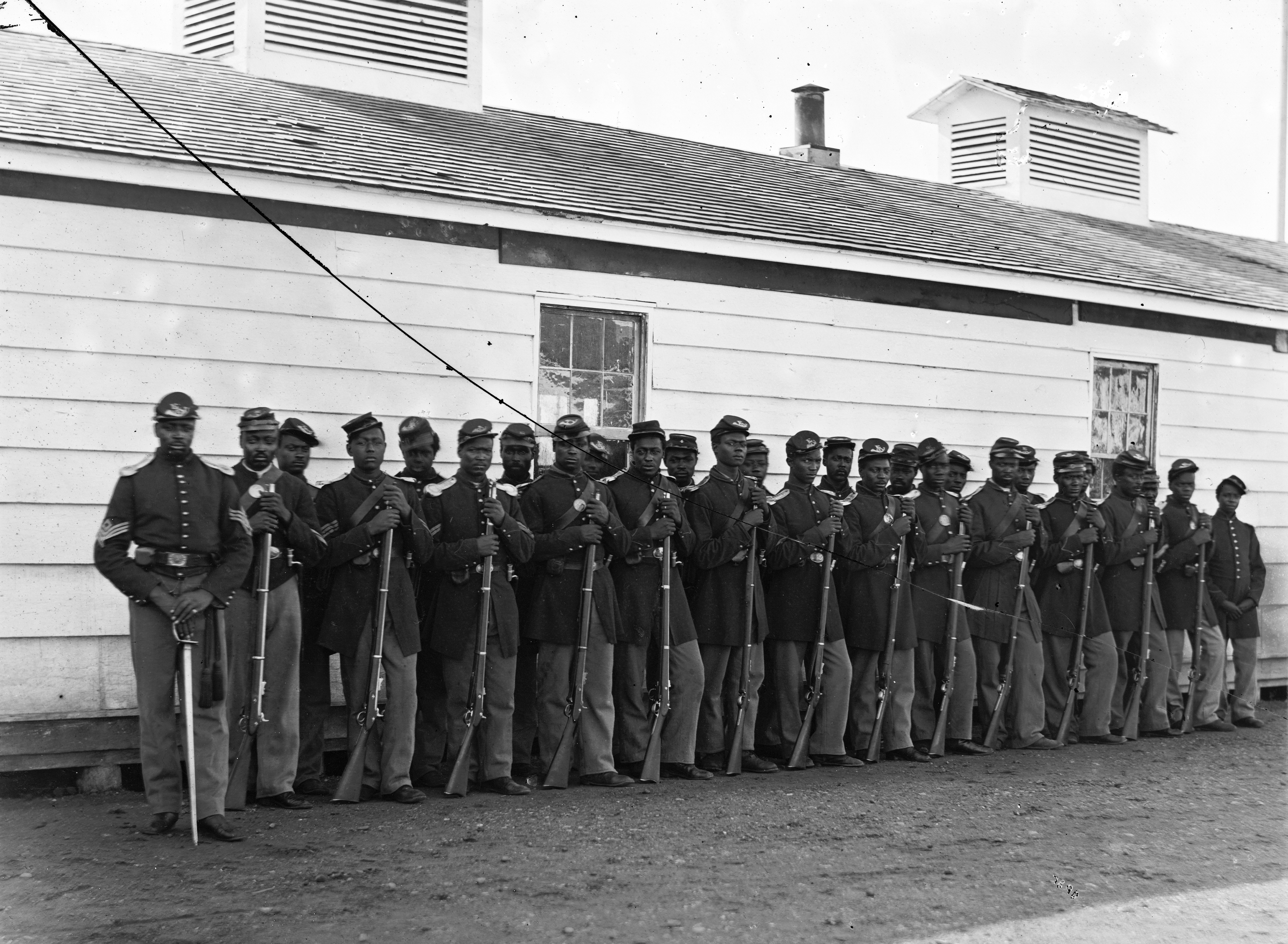
Company E of the 4th United States Colored Troops Infantry Regiment, which served in the Battle of Chaffin's Farm.

At about the same time Birney's first attack moved forward, the Union XVIII Corps under Major General Edward Ord, assaulted Fort Harrison to the west of New Market Heights. Ord's assault was led by Brig. Gen. George Stannard, a veteran of Gettysburg. Stannard's men rushed across an open field and took cover in a slight depression just in front of the fort and, after a moment's rest, took the fort. The Confederate defenders broke to the rear, seeking refuge behind a secondary line. Brig. Gen. Hiram Burnham was killed during the attack, and the Union troops renamed the captured fort in his honor.

Once inside the fort, the Union attackers became disorganized. All three of Stannard's brigade commanders were wounded or killed. A supporting column under Brig. Gen. Charles A. Heckman veered far off to the north and was repulsed. Ord personally attempted to rally the troops to exploit their success, but he too fell with a critical wound. The loss of commanders and the presence of Confederate ironclads on the James put an end to the XVIII Corps' drive on Chaffin's Bluff along the James River.

Robert E. Lee realized the severity of the loss of Fort Harrison and personally brought 10,000 reinforcements under Maj. Gen. Charles Field north from Petersburg. On September 30, Lee ordered a counter-attack to retake Fort Harrison, now commanded by Maj. Gen. Godfrey Weitzel, replacing the wounded Ord. The Confederate attacks were uncoordinated and were easily repulsed.

== Aftermath ==
Just as Grant had anticipated, the fighting around Chaffin's Farm forced Lee to shift his resources and helped the Union army south of Petersburg win the Battle of Peebles' Farm. After October, the two armies settled into trench warfare that continued until the end of the war. The fighting around Chaffin's Farm cost the nation nearly 5,000 casualties.

=== Medal of Honor recipients ===
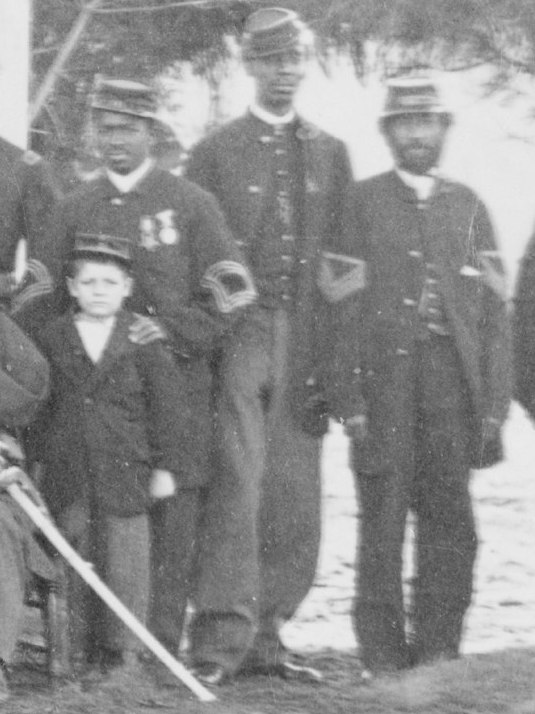
Standing at left, Sgt. Major Christian Fleetwood wearing both the Medal of Honor and the Butler Medal with non-commissioned officers of the 4th U.S. Colored Infantry, Fort Slocum, April 1865

The following men received the Medal of Honor for action in the battle:

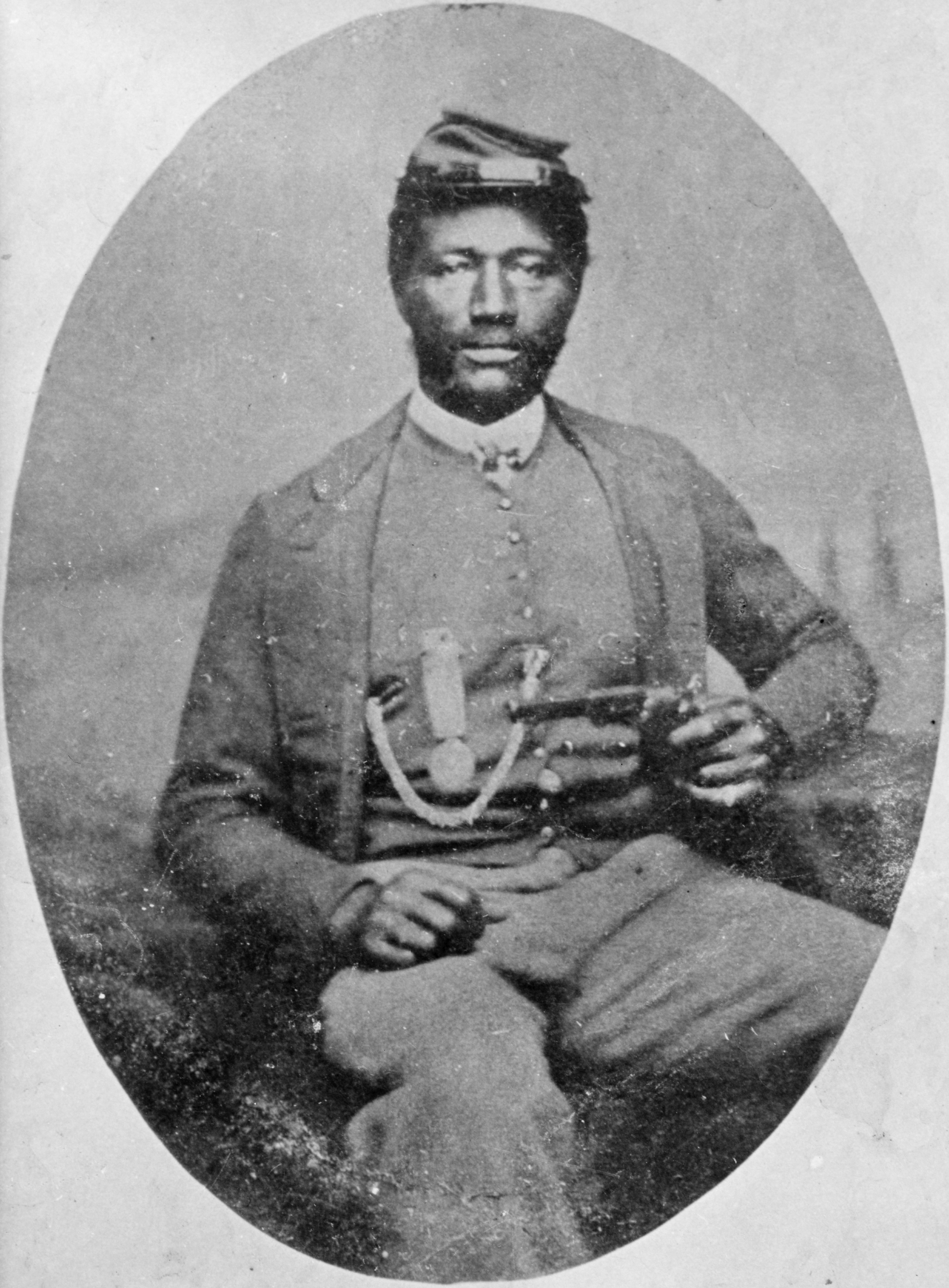
James H. Harris, of the 38th Colored Infantry Unit, who earned the Medal of Honor for his actions in the Battle of Chaffin's Farm.

- William H. Barnes
- Joseph H. Shea
- Powhatan Beaty
- Thomas Belcher
- James H. Bronson
- George A. Buchanan
- Nathan Huntley Edgerton
- Augustine Demetrius Flanagan
- Christian Fleetwood
- James Daniel Gardner
- James H. Harris
- Thomas R. Hawkins
- Alfred B. Hilton
- Milton M. Holland
- William Stone Hubbell
- Miles James
- Franklin Johndro
- Alexander Kelly
- Nathaniel A. McKown
- Robert A. Pinn
- Edward Ratcliff
- John Schiller
- Ebenezer Skellie
- Charles Veale
- William Laing

Three Medal of Honor recipients from the 6th U.S. Colored Infantry Regiment are depicted in a painting, Three Medals of Honor by artist Don Troiani. The painting was unveiled June 24, 2013 at the Union League of Philadelphia. Portrayed in the painting are Nathan H. Edgerton, Thomas R. Hawkins, and Alexander Kelly.

== Battlefield preservation ==
As of late 2021, the American Battlefield Trust and its partners have acquired and preserved 87 acres (0.35 km^{2}) of the battlefield.

== See also ==
- Butler Medal, awarded to numerous participants
