= Don Troiani =

American painter

- Born: 1949 (age 76–77); New York City
- Education: Pennsylvania Academy of Fine Arts

Don Troiani (born 1949) is an American painter whose work focuses on his native country's military heritage, mostly from the American Revolution, War of 1812 and American Civil War. His highly realistic and historically accurate oil and watercolor works are most well known in the form of marketed mass-produced printed limited-edition reproductions, illustrated books, book compilations, museum and government collections. He also collects militaria.

== Biography ==
Troiani was born in New York City and lived in Pound Ridge, N.Y.. He went to Fox Lane High School and afterwards studied at the Pennsylvania Academy of Fine Arts and New York City's Art Students League between 1967 and 1971. He currently lives in Connecticut.

== Artistic style and historical accuracy ==
Don Troiani's paintings are realistic and academic in style, mostly oil on canvas or Gouache on paper. He uses posed models with clothing and equipment from his collection of original uniforms, equipage, insignia and weapons. Troiani also studies battlefields, weather conditions, and structures depicted in his paintings firsthand. Forty of his original paintings have been in a special exhibition at the Museum of the American Revolution in Philadelphia from October 2021 until September 2022. Also the Heinz History Center, "Wars of Empire and Liberty" July 2023 through July 2024.

== Militaria collector ==
Troiani has an extensive collection of Civil War, War of 1812, Revolutionary War, and World War II uniforms, equipage, insignia and weapons. He also consults and appraises for museums and collectors on the subject of military artifacts. Items from his militaria collection have appeared in the Time-Life "Echoes Of Glory" series on the Civil War. Other artifacts of his have been loaned for exhibition at the Smithsonian Institution, Delaware Historical Society, Connecticut Museum of History, Museum of the American Revolution, Pamplin Historical Park, The West Point Museum, Virginia Historical Society, and the National Park Service Visitors Center in Gettysburg, Pennsylvania.

== Historical consultant and artwork credits ==
Troiani has been a consultant on Civil War uniforms and equipage for the feature film, Cold Mountain, 52 episodes of History Channel's Civil War Journal, and the 1994 A&E miniseries The American Revolution and "FOX Nation".

He has appraised and authenticated collections for the Connecticut State Capitol, Connecticut State Library, Atlanta History Center (Atlanta Historical Society), Confederate Memorial Hall in New Orleans, auction houses and private individuals.

Numerous items from his collection have appeared in the Time-Life "Echoes Of Glory" series on the Civil War and countless other publications. Other of his artifacts have been loaned for the exhibition at the Smithsonian Institution, Delaware Historical Society, Connecticut Museum of History, Pamplin Park, The West Point Museum, Virginia Historical Society and the National Park Service Visitors Center in Gettysburg, PA.

Troiani's artwork has appeared in print and television productions; NBC, PBS, CPTV, CNN, PBS News Hour, A&E, Fox News, History Channel, Military and Discovery channels and in publications including "National Geographic", "The New York Post", "Fine Art Connoisseur", "The Washington Post", "The Washington Times", "US News and World Reports", "American Heritage", "American Battlefield Trust", "Los Angeles Times", American Rifleman", "USA Today", "The Magazine Antiques", "The Boston Globe", "Numismatic News", "The New York Times", "Smithsonian", " The Hartford Courant".

In 1995 he designed 3 Civil War Commemorative Coins for the United States Mint. His work has also appeared on a U.S. postal card commemorating the 350th anniversary of the U.S. National Guard. Troiani is also a recipient of the Meritorious Service Award of the United States National Guard.

Many of his paintings appeared on Ken Burns"The American Revolution" documentary on PBS.

== Institutions holding or have displayed Troiani's work ==
Troiani's work is held or has been displayed by numerous institutions including The U.S. Army National Museum, National Museum of African American History and Culture, African American Museum in Philadelphia, National Civil War Museum, The National Park Service, Pritzker Military Museum & Library, Museum of the American Revolution, Heinz History Center, Fort Ticonderoga, Booth Western Art Museum, Cody Firearms Museum, Oneida Indian Nation, Rhode Island State House, Boston Tea Party Ships and Museum, West Point Museum at the United States Military Academy, Virginia Military Institute, Smithsonian National Museum of American History, Springfield Armory National Historical Site, Heritage Center of the Union League of Philadelphia, Star Spangled Banner National Historical Trail.

== Books ==
Books authored and co-authored by Don Troiani:

- Troiani, Don (1995). Don Troiani's Civil War. Mechanicsburg, OA: Stackpole Books. p. 224. ISBN 0-8117-0341-X.
- Don Troiani's Civil War (1995) ISBN 0-8117-0341-X OCLC 32051224
- Soldiers in America 1754-1865 (1998) ISBN 0-8117-0519-6
- Military Buttons of the American Revolution (2001) ISBN 1-57747-061-3
- Don Troiani's Soldiers of the American Revolution (2007) ISBN 0-8117-3323-8 OCLC 65207021
- Don Troiani's Regiments and Uniforms of the Civil War (2002) ISBN 0-8117-0520-X OCLC 48920181
- Don Troiani's American Battles: the art of the nation at war, 1754-1865 (2006) ISBN 0-8117-3327-0 OCLC 64065817
- Insignia of Independence - Military Buttons and Accoutrement Plates of the American Revolution (2012) ISBN 978-1-57747-169-1
- Don Troiani's Civil War Soldiers (2017) ISBN 978-0-8117-1970-4
- Don Troiani's Campaign to Saratoga-1777 (2019) ISBN 978-0-8117-3852-1
- Don Troiani's Gettysburg: 36 Masterful Paintings and Riveting History of the Civil War's Epic Battle (2019) ISBN 978-0-8117-3835-4
- Liberty Don Troiani's Paintings of the Revolutionary War (2021) ISBN 978-0-8117-7040-8, 978-0-8117-7068-2
- Don Troiani's Black Soldiers in America's Wars 1754-1865 (2025) ISBN 978-0-8117-7371-3, 978-0-8117-7372-0
- Don Troiani's Civil War Uniforms of Union and Confederate Soldiers(2026) ISBN 978-0-8117-7570-0
