= 85th Pennsylvania Infantry Regiment =

Union Army infantry regiment

85th Regiment Pennsylvania Volunteer Infantry
- Active: October 16, 1861, to November 22, 1864
- Country: United States
- Allegiance: Union
- Branch: Infantry
- Engagements: Siege of Yorktown; Battle of Williamsburg; Battle of Seven Pines; Seven Days Battles; Battle of Kinston; Battle of White Hall; Battle of Goldsborough Bridge; Second Battle of Fort Wagner; Second Battle of Charleston Harbor; Bermuda Hundred Campaign; Second Battle of Deep Bottom; Battle of Chaffin's Farm; Battle of Darbytown and New Market Roads; Battle of Fair Oaks & Darbytown Road

The 85th Regiment Pennsylvania Volunteer Infantry was an infantry regiment that served in the Union Army during the American Civil War.

== Service ==
The 85th Pennsylvania Infantry was organized at Uniontown, Pennsylvania, beginning October 16, 1861, and mustered in for a three-year enlistment under the command of Colonel Joshua B. Howell.

The regiment was attached to 2nd Brigade, Casey's Division, Army of the Potomac, to March 1862.

- 2nd Brigade, 3rd Division, IV Corps, Army of the Potomac, to June 1862.
- 2nd Brigade, 2nd Division, IV Corps, to September 1862.
- Wessell's Brigade, Division at Suffolk, Virginia, VII Corps, Department of Virginia, to December 1862.
- 1st Brigade, 1st Division, Department of North Carolina, to January 1863.
- 2nd Brigade, 3rd Division, XVIII Corps, Department of North Carolina, to February 1863.
- 2nd Brigade, 2nd Division, XVIII Corps, Department of the South, to April 1863.
- Folly Island, South Carolina, X Corps, Department of the South, to June 1863.
- 1st Brigade, Folly Island, South Carolina, X Corps, to July 1863.
- 1st Brigade, 2nd Division, Morris Island, South Carolina, X Corps, July 1863.
- 2nd Brigade, Morris Island, South Carolina, X Corps, to October 1863.
- Howell's Brigade, Gordon's Division, Folly Island, South Carolina, X Corps, to December 1863.
- District of Hilton Head, South Carolina, X Corps, to April 1864.
- 1st Brigade, 1st Division, X Corps, Department of Virginia and North Carolina, to November 1864.

The 85th Pennsylvania Infantry mustered out November 22, 1864. Veterans and recruits were transferred to the 188th Pennsylvania Infantry.

== Detailed service ==
- Left Pennsylvania for Washington, D.C. Duty in the defenses of Washington, D. C., until March 1862.
- Advance on Manassas, Va., March 10–15.
- Moved to the Peninsula March 28.
  - Siege of Yorktown April 5-May 4.
  - Battle of Williamsburg May 5.
  - Reconnaissance to Seven Pines May 24–27.
  - Skirmishes at Seven Pines, Savage Station and Chickahominy May 24.
  - Battle of Seven Pines, May 31-June 1.
  - Seven days before Richmond June 25-July 1.
  - Brackett's June 30.
  - Malvern Hill July 1.
  - At Harrison's Landing until August 16.
- Moved to Fortress Monroe August 16–23.
- Suffolk, September 18-December.
  - Reconnaissance to Franklin on the Blackwater October 3.
- Ordered to New Bern, N.C., December 4.
- Foster's Expedition to Goldsborough December 10–21.
  - Southwest Creek December 13–14.
  - Kinston, December 14.
  - White hall, December 16.
  - Goldsborough, December 17.
- Duty at New Bern, N.C., until January 1863.
- Moved to Port Royal, S.C., January 28–31.
- At St. Helena Island, S.C., until April.
- At Folly Island, S.C., until July.
- Siege of Forts Wagner and Gregg, Morris Island, and operations against Fort Sumter and Charleston, July 18-September 7.
  - Attack on Morris Island July 10.
  - Assaults on Fort Wagner, July 11 and 18.
- Duty on Morris and Folly Islands operating against Charleston until December.
- Moved to Hilton Head, S.C., and duty there until April 1864.
- Expedition to Whitemarsh Island, Ga., February 22.
- Moved to Gloucester Point, Va., April.
- Butler's operations on south side of James River and against Petersburg and Richmond May 4–28.
  - Ware Bottom Church May 9.
  - Swift Creek May 9–10.
  - Proctor's Creek and operations against Fort Darling May 12–16.
    - Battle of Drewry's Bluff May 14–16.
  - Operations on Bermuda Hundred front May 17–30.
    - Ware Bottom Church May 20.
- Siege operations against Petersburg and Richmond June 16-November 22, 1864.
  - Port Walthall June 16–17.
  - Ware Bottom Church June 20.
  - Demonstration on north side of the James at Deep Bottom August 13–20.
    - Strawberry Plains, Deep Bottom, August 14–18.
  - Chaffin's Farm, New Market Heights, September 28–30.
  - Darbytown Road October 7.
  - Battle of Fair Oaks October 27–28, 1864.

== Casualties ==
The regiment lost a total of 247 men during service; 7 officers and 90 enlisted men killed or mortally wounded, 4 officers and 146 enlisted men died from disease-related causes.

== Commanders ==
- Colonel Joshua B. Howell
- Major Edward Campbell

== Notable members ==
- Captain John Adam Gordon, the first superintendent of schools in Greene County.
- Sergeant Marquis Lafayette Gordon, son of John A. Gordon, who wrote two books about his time as a medical missionary in Japan in the late 1800s. He is also the great grandfather of Wyoming Governor Mark Gordon.
- Colonel Joshua Blackwood Howell, prominent Uniontown lawyer who created and organized the 85th regiment. Tragically died in September 1864 near Richmond when thrown from his horse.
- James Huff, who also served in the artillery and cavalry in his career, was awarded a Medal of Honor for "valiant conduct against the Apaches during the winter of 1872-73."
- Captain Robert Patterson Hughes, who enlisted as a private and, in a military career of more than 50 years, rose to the rank of major general.
- Private William E. Leonard, Company F - Medal of Honor recipient for the capture of an enemy flag during the Second Battle of Deep Bottom near Richmond, VA in August of 1964
- Private Francis Morrison, Company H - Medal of Honor recipient for risking his life to drag a fallen comrade, Jesse Dial, to safety action during the Battle of Bermuda Hundred on June 17th, 1864.
- Lieutenant Colonel Henry A. Purviance, co-editor and publisher of the Washington (PA) Reporter and Tribune. Killed in the trenches on Morris Island near Fort Wagner by friendly fire in August 1863.
- 1st Lieutenant Norman B. Ream, Company H - purportedly the youngest soldier to be promoted from private to 1st lieutenant in the Union Army; served on the board of directors of the National Biscuit Company
- Chief Musiciain Henry L. Regar of Connellville, who was the longest living Pennsylvania veteran to serve in both the Mexican War and Civil War.
- Adjutant Andrew Stewart, who later served in the U.S. House of Representatives.
- Edward Campbell of Uniontown, who rose in rank from private to lieutenant colonel during his war service. After the war, in 1866, he was appointed to district judge by the governor, becoming the youngest judge in Pennsylvania at age 28.
- Milton McJunkin of Bentleyville, whose letters were published a book called, "The Bloody 85th" by Patrick Schroeder, Ronn Palm and Richard Sauers in 2000. McJunkin died from disease in 1864, shortly before the end of his 3-year enlistment.
- Boyd Crumrine, who became a prominent attorney and local historian in Washington, PA following the war.

== See also ==
- List of Pennsylvania Civil War Units
- Pennsylvania in the Civil War
