= Troop engagements of the American Civil War, 1864 =

Years
1861
1862
1863
1864
1865
or return to the main page.

The following engagements took place in the year 1864 during the American Civil War. The Union armies, under the command of U.S. Grant, launched multiple offenses in all theaters of the war, in an attempt to prevent Confederate forces from transferring troops from one army to another.

== History ==
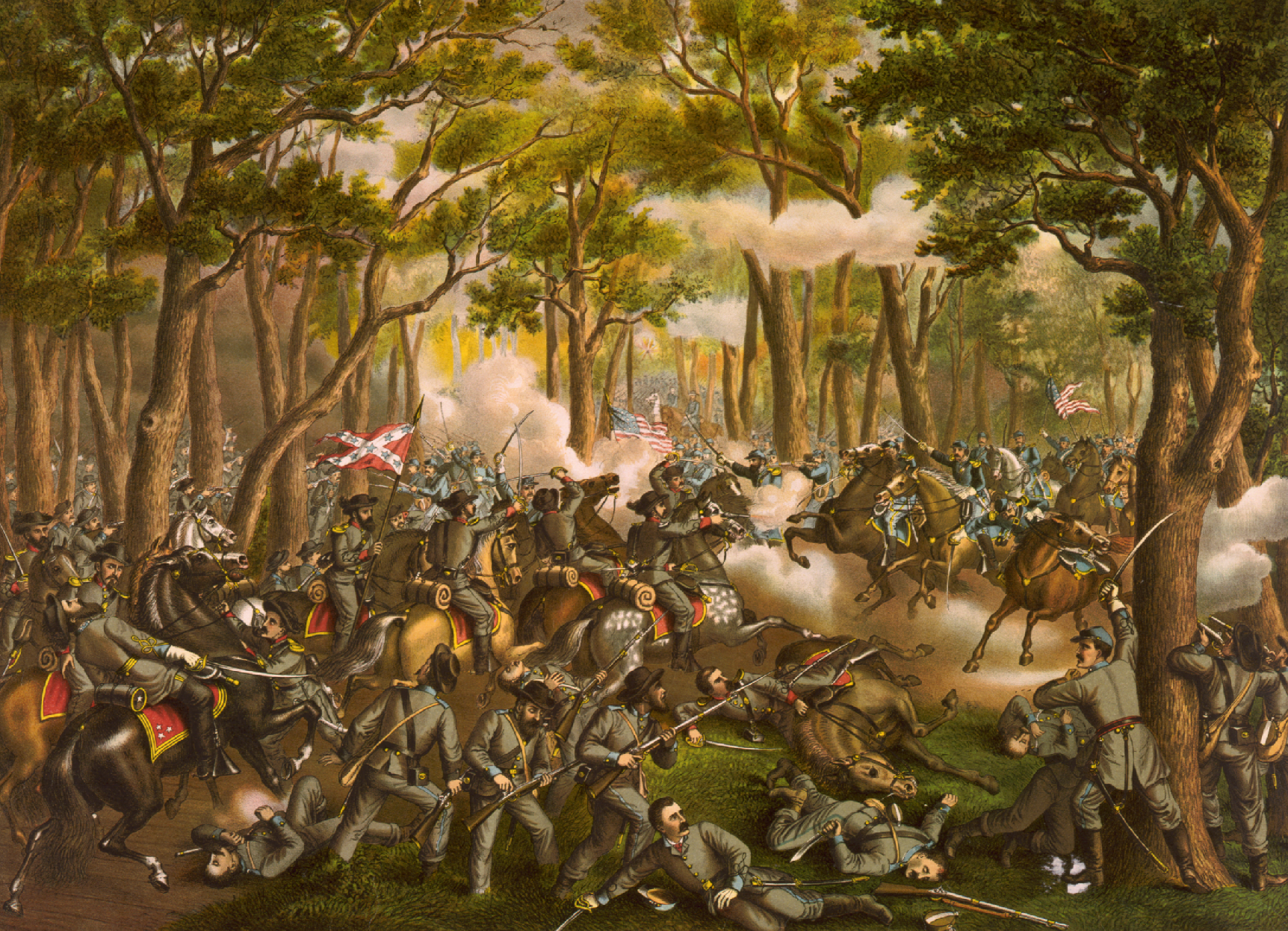
19th century illustration of the Battle of the Wilderness

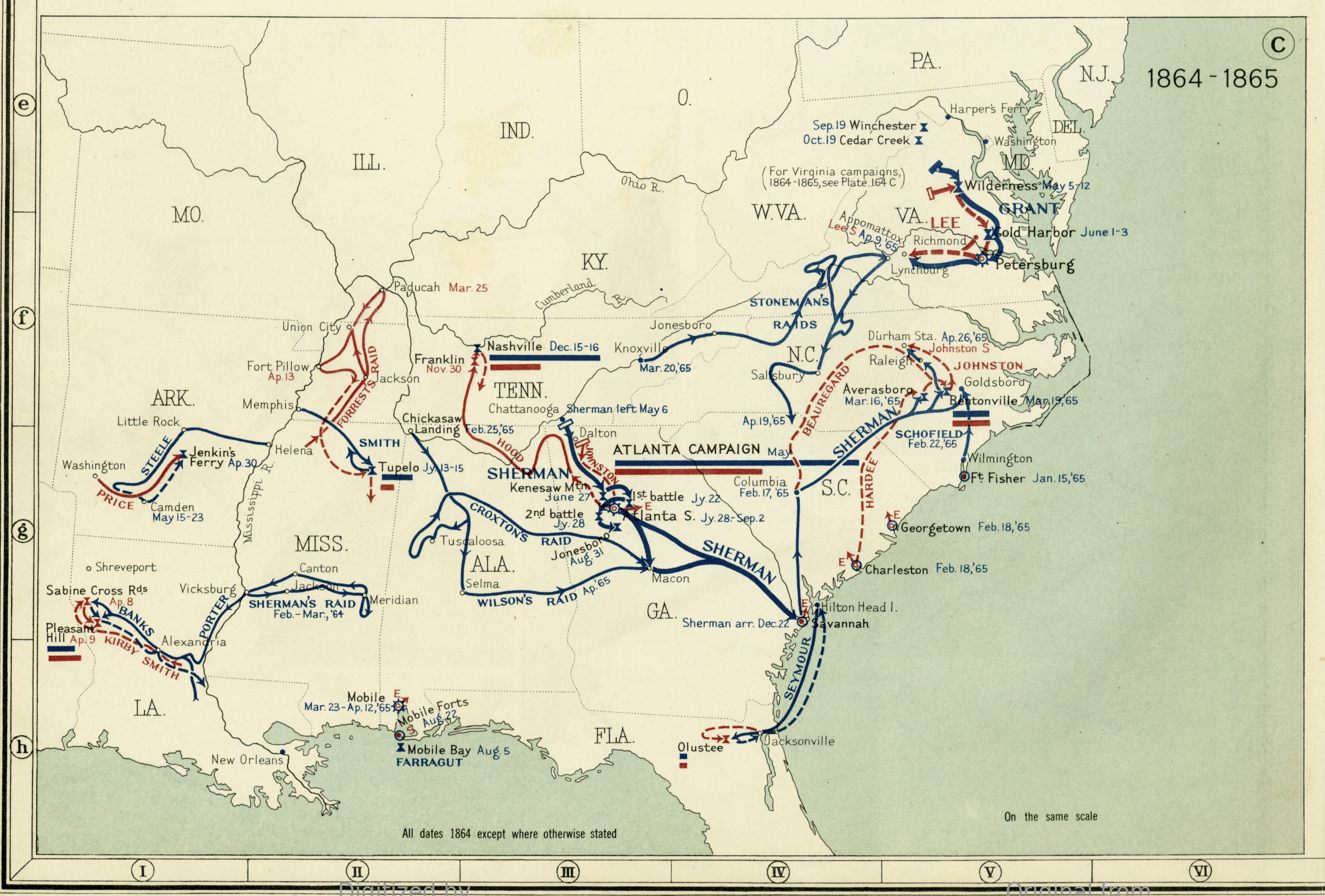
Map of the American Civil War in 1864-1865.

In March, Ulysses S. Grant was promoted to lieutenant general and appointed general-in-chief of the Union Army. He decided on a strategy of simultaneous offenses in the Eastern, Western, and Trans-Mississippi Theaters in order to grind down and ultimately defeat the Confederate armies. Grant himself planned to travel with the Army of the Potomac, commanded by George G. Meade, and the IX Corps, commanded by Ambrose Burnside, both to coordinate the two forces and to avoid the politics of Washington, D.C. (Burnside was senior to Meade and therefore would have the right to command the Army of the Potomac, so in order to retain Meade Grant had both commanders report to him. Grant concluded on May 25 that this command structure was unwieldy and placed Burnside under Meade's command.) In the Eastern Theater, Grant's forces fought General Robert E. Lee's Army of Northern Virginia in a series of battles that became known as the Overland Campaign from May to June. Although he lost heavily during the campaign and failed to gain a tactical advantage in any of the battles, Grant inflicted a larger percentage of casualties on Lee than the Union army incurred and also forced Lee into retreating closer to Richmond. Following the Battle of Cold Harbor, Grant crossed the James River and attacked the city of Petersburg, which was a vital rail center for Lee's supply lines to North Carolina. Several Union attacks on the Confederate defenses near the city in early June resulted in failure; as a result, Grant settled into a nine-month siege at Petersburg, during which he continued to move westward in order to cut Lee's supply lines.

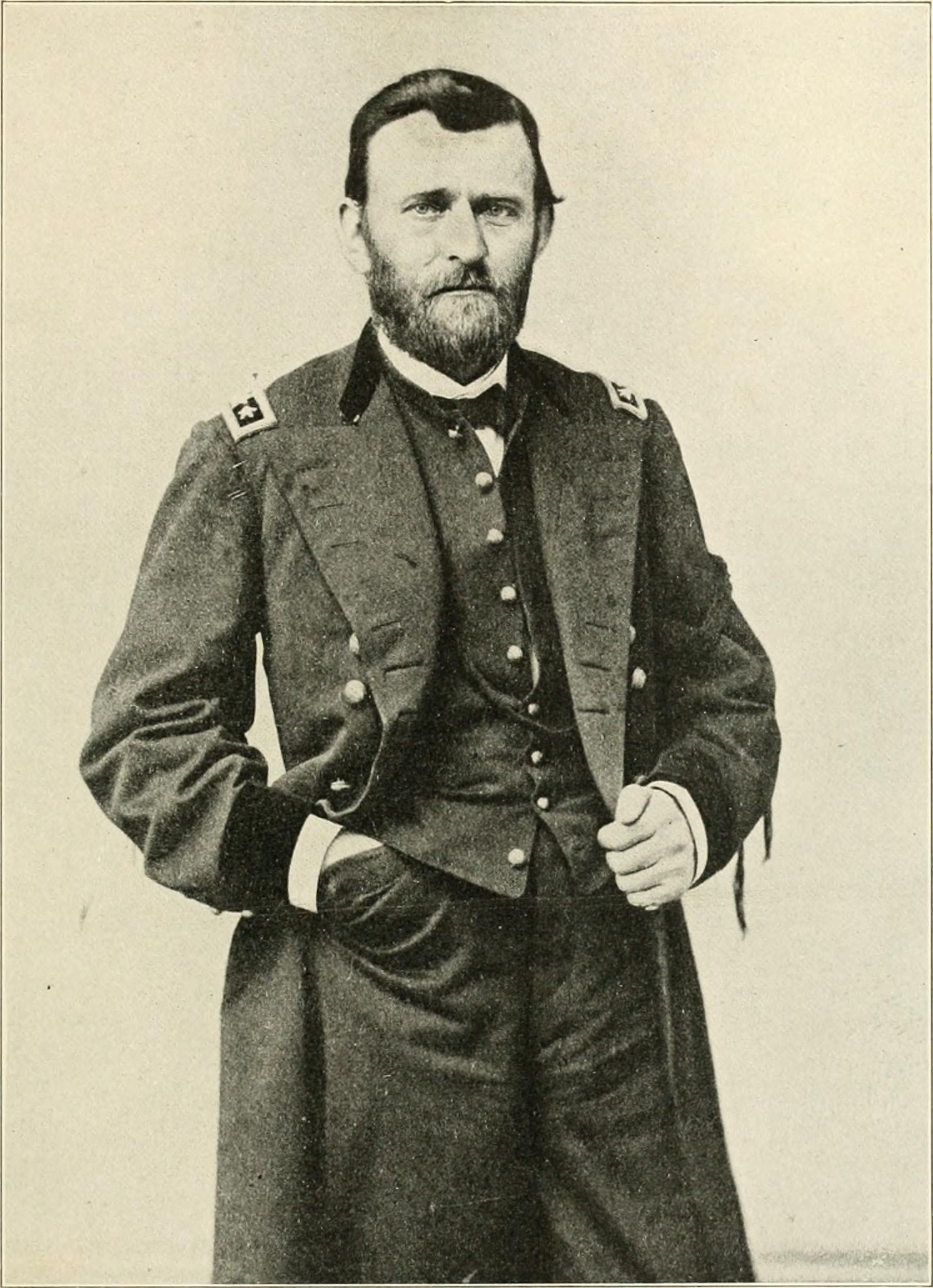
Ulysses S. Grant, general-in-chief of the Union armies

Grant planned for two other campaigns in the Eastern Theater: the Army of the James commanded by Major General Benjamin Butler landed on the Bermuda Hundred peninsula near Petersburg, with orders to cut the Richmond & Petersburg Railroad and to prevent reinforcements from reaching Lee's army. After building fortifications on the peninsula, Butler made several advances towards the railroad, each time retreating back to his fortifications after a brief skirmish with Confederate forces. Following the Battle of Ware Bottom Church, the Confederates built a line of fortifications parallel to the Union lines, bottling up Butler's force and allowing reinforcements to be detached to Lee.

In the Shenandoah Valley, another Union force commanded by Major General Franz Sigel advanced southward until he encountered a small Confederate force commanded by Major General John C. Breckinridge at the Battle of New Market on May 15, which resulted in a Confederate victory. Sigel was replaced by David Hunter, who started his campaign near the end of May. His victory at Piedemont on June 5 caused to Lee to detach his Second Corps, under Lieutenant General Jubal Early, to the Valley to deal with the Union forces. Hunter attacked Early's command at Lynchburg but was defeated; Hunter then retreated through West Virginia to the Ohio River, allowing Early to move north through the Valley. Early then launched a raid on Washington, D.C., but due to the delay caused by the Battle of Monocacy failed to arrive at the city before Union reinforcements did, making a successful attack impossible. Early was then able to retreat back into the Shenandoah Valley with the supplies his army had seized and from there launched several additional small raids which the local Union commanders were unable to prevent. To deal with these raids and combat the Confederate forces in the Valley effectively, Grant consolidated the various military departments in the area into the Middle Military Division, commanded by Philip H. Sheridan. During a three-month campaign, Sheridan successfully destroyed both the Confederate fighting capabilities in the Shenandoah and the supplies the Confederates needed to feed Lee's army at Petersburg.

In the Western Theater, Union forces were placed in the Military Division of the Mississippi, commanded by Major General William T. Sherman, who had orders to capture Atlanta. During the three-month Atlanta campaign, Sherman outflanked Joseph E. Johnston's Army of Tennessee out of one position after another until the two forces reached Atlanta. Fearing he would abandon the city without a fight, Confederate President Jefferson Davis replaced Johnston with John B. Hood, who launched a series of attacks on Sherman's armies, which each time failed with heavy Confederate casualties. When Sherman cut the Montgomery & Atlanta Railroad in early September, the Confederate supply lines into the city were cut and Hood was forced to abandon Atlanta. For the next two months, Hood and Sherman skirmished as Hood attempted to cut Sherman's supply lines to the North; Sherman eventually gave up trying to catch Hood and instead embarked on his Savannah campaign. Hood, instead of following Sherman, moved north into Tennessee, intending to capture Nashville before going into Kentucky. He lost heavily in a frontal attack at the Battle of Franklin on November 30, suffering over 7,000 casualties including thirteen generals killed, wounded, or captured; this left him with too few men to overrun the Union fortifications at Nashville, so Hood instead constructed fortifications a few miles to the south and tried to entice the Union commander, Major General George H. Thomas, to attack him. On December 15–16, Thomas did attack, routing most of the Confederate army on both days and capturing over 70 cannons and 15,000 prisoners. Hood retreated back to Alabama, where he was relieved of command by his own request; the Army of Tennessee was reduced to barely 20,000 men by casualties and desertions during the retreat.

In the Trans-Mississippi Theater, Major General Nathaniel P. Banks led his Army of the Gulf up the Red River in Louisiana, intending to invade eastern Texas and to seize cotton to supply the New England cotton mills. The Confederate commander of the District of Western Louisiana, Major General Richard Taylor, steadily retreated until both forces neared Mansfield, where on April 7, Taylor attacked and routed Banks' force; another battle was fought the next day near Pleasant Hill but the Confederates were defeated. Banks continued retreating along the river until he reached the Red River's confluence with the Mississippi. A simultaneous campaign from Union controlled northern Arkansas was launched, which was planned to link up with Banks' force at Shreveport, Louisiana, but was turned back due to a lack of supplies.

== Engagements ==
Date	Engagement	Military units	Losses
January 17	Dandridge, Tennessee	Elements of Confederate First Corps, Army of Northern Virginia and Union IV Corps, Army of the Cumberland	Confederate unknown, Union 150
January 26	Athens, Alabama	Confederate cavalry brigade, Union garrison	Confederate 30, Union 20
January 27 – 28	Fair Garden, Tennessee	Elements of Confederate First Corps, Army of Northern Virginia and Union IV Corps, Army of the Cumberland	Confederate 165, Union 100
February 6 – 7	Morton's Ford, Virginia	Confederate Second Corps, Army of Northern Virginia, Union two divisions from the Army of the Potomac	Confederate 60, Union 261
February 13	Middle Boggy, Oklahoma	Confederate Seminole battalion of Mounted Rifles, Union 14th Kansas Cavalry and two howitzers	Confederate 47, Union 0
February 14 – 20	Meridian, Mississippi	Confederate Department of Alabama, Mississippi, and East Louisiana, Union Army of the Tennessee	Confederate 5, Union 170
February 20	Olustee, Florida	Confederate District of East Florida, Union detachment from the Department of the South	Confederate 946, Union 1,861
February 22	Okolona, Mississippi	Confederate Forrest's Cavalry Corps, Union detachment, Army of the Tennessee	Confederate 144, Union 388
February 22 – 27	Dalton I, Georgia	Confederate Army of the Tennessee, Union Army of the Cumberland	Confederate 140, Union 289
March 2	Walkerton, Virginia	Confederate Department of Richmond, Union Cavalry Corps, Army of the Potomac	Confederate none, Union 100
March 14	Fort DeRussy, Louisiana	Confederate District of West Louisiana, Union Army of the Gulf	Confederate 269, Union 48
March 18	Laredo, Texas	Confederate 33rd Texas Cavalry, Union 1st Texas Cavalry	unknown
March 21	Henderson's Hill, Louisiana	Confederate and Union cavalry	Confederate 250, Union unknown
March 25	Paducah, Kentucky	Confederate Forrest's Cavalry Corps, Union garrison	Confederate 50, Union 90
April 3–4	Elkin's Ferry, Arkansas	Confederate District of Arkansas, Union Department of Arkansas	Confederate 29, Union 26
April 7	Wilson's Farm, Louisiana	Cavalry from Confederate District of West Louisiana and Union Army of the Gulf	unknown
April 8	Mansfield, Louisiana	Confederate District of West Louisiana, Union Army of the Gulf	Confederate 1,000, Union 2,235
April 9	Pleasant Hill, Louisiana	Confederate District of West Louisiana, Union Army of the Gulf	Confederate 1,626, Union 1,369
April 10–15	Prairie D'Ane, Arkansas	Confederate District of Arkansas, Union Department of Arkansas	Confederate 50, Union 100
April 12	Blair's Landing, Louisiana	Confederate cavalry brigade, Union transports and gunboats	Confederate 57, Union 60
April 12	Fort Pillow, Tennessee	Confederate Forrest's Cavalry Corps, Union garrison	Confederate 100, Union 549
April 17–20	Plymouth, North Carolina	Confederate infantry division from Department of North Carolina, Union garrison	Confederate 300, Union 2,900 (including 2,834 prisoners)
April 18	Poison Spring, Arkansas	Union detachment, Confederate cavalry from Trans-Mississippi Department	Confederate 114, Union 301
April 23	Monett's Ferry, Louisiana	Union and Confederate cavalry	Confederate 400, Union 200
April 25	Marks' Mills, Arkansas	Confederate District of Arkansas, Union Department of Arkansas	Confederate 293, Union 1,500
April 30	Jenkins' Ferry, Arkansas	Confederate District of Arkansas, Union Department of Arkansas	Confederate 1,000, Union 700
May 5	Albemarle Sound, North Carolina	Confederate ships Albemarle and Bombshell, Union ships Miami and two others	88 total
May 5–7	the Wilderness, Virginia	Confederate Army of Northern Virginia, Union Army of the Potomac and IX Corps	Confederate 10,830, Union 17,666
May 6–7	Port Walthall Junction, Virginia	Confederate Department of North Carolina and Southern Virginia, Union Army of the James	550 total
May 7–13	Rocky Face Ridge, Georgia	Confederate Army of Tennessee, Union Military Division of the Mississippi	Confederate 600, Union 837
May 8–21	Spotsylvania Court House, Virginia	Confederate Army of Northern Virginia, Union Army of the Potomac	Confederate 12,062, Union 18,399
May 9	Swift Creek and Fort Clifton, Virginia	Confederate Department of North Carolina and Southern Virginia, Union Army of the James	990 total
May 9	Cloyd's Mountain, Virginia	Confederate Department of Southwest Virginia, Union Army of West Virginia	Confederate 538, Union 688
May 10	Chester Station, Virginia	Confederate Department of North Carolina and Southern Virginia, Union Army of the James	569 total
May 10	Cove Mountain, Virginia	Cavalry from Confederate Department of South-West Virginia and Union Army of West Virginia	300 total
May 11	Yellow Tavern, Virginia	Cavalry corps from Confederate Army of Northern Virginia and Union Army of the Potomac	800 total
May 12–16	Proctor's Creek (Drewry's Bluff), Virginia	Confederate Department of North Carolina and Southern Virginia, Union Army of the James	Confederate 1,000, Union 3,004
May 13–15	Resaca, Georgia	Confederate Army of Tennessee, Union Military Division of the Mississippi	Confederate 2,800, Union 2,747
May 15	New Market, Virginia	Confederate Department of Western Virginia, Union Army of West Virginia	Confederate 587, Union 762
May 16	Mansura, Louisiana	Confederate District of West Louisiana, Union Army of the Gulf	Confederate unknown, Union unknown
May 17	Adairsville, Georgia	Confederate Army of Tennessee, Union Military Division of the Mississippi	Confederate unknown, Union 200
May 18	Yellow Bayou, Louisiana	Confederate District of West Louisiana, Union Army of the Gulf	Confederate 500, Union 360
May 20	Ware Bottom Church and Howlett Line, Virginia	Confederate Department of North Carolina and Southern Virginia, Union Army of the James	1,500 total
May 23–26	North Anna, Virginia	Confederate Army of Northern Virginia, Union Army of the Potomac	Confederate 1,251, Union 2,138
May 24	Wilson's Wharf	Confederate cavalry from Army of Northern Virginia, Union detachment from Army of the James	Confederate 140, Union 26
May 25–26	New Hope Church, Georgia	Confederate Army of Tennessee, Union Military Division of the Mississippi	Confederate 350, Union 665
May 27	Pickett's Mill, Georgia	Confederate Army of Tennessee, Union Military Division of the Mississippi	Confederate 450, Union 1,600
May 28	Haw's Shop, Virginia	Confederate Cavalry Corps, Army of Northern Virginia, Union Cavalry Corps, Army of the Potomac	Confederate 400, Union 344
May 28	Dallas, Georgia	Confederate Army of Tennessee, Union Military Division of the Mississippi	Confederate 1,000–1,500, Union 380
May 28–30	Totopotomoy Creek and Bethesda Church, Virginia	Confederate Army of Northern Virginia, Union Army of the Potomac	Confederate 1,159, Union 731
May 30	Matadequin Creek (Old Church), Virginia	Cavalry brigade from Army of Northern Virginia, Cavalry brigade from Union Army of the Potomac	Confederate unknown, Union 90
May 31 – June 12	Cold Harbor, Virginia	Confederate Army of Northern Virginia, Union Army of the Potomac	Confederate 4,847, Union 14,932
June 5	Piedmont, Virginia	Confederate Department of Western Virginia, Union Army of West Virginia	Confederate 1,600, Union 875
June 5–6	Old River Lake, Arkansas	Confederate division from District of Arkansas, Two Union brigades from District of Arkansas	Confederate 37, Union 133
June 9	Petersburg I, Virginia	Confederate Army of Northern Virginia, Union Army of the Potomac	120 total
June 9–18	Lost Mountain–Brushy Mountain Line, Georgia	Confederate Army of Tennessee, Union Military Division of the Mississippi	unknown
June 10	Brices Cross Roads, Mississippi	Confederate Forrest's Cavalry Corps, Union infantry and cavalry	Confederate 493, Union 2,612
June 11–12	Trevilian Station, Virginia	Cavalry corps from Union Army of the Potomac and Confederate Army of Northern Virginia	Confederate 1,071, Union 1,007
June 11–12	Cynthiana, Kentucky	Confederate Morgan's brigade, Union garrison	Confederate 1,000, Union 1,092
June 15–18	Petersburg II, Virginia	Confederate Army of Northern Virginia, Union Army of the Potomac	Confederate 2,974–4,700, Union 9,964–10,600
June 17–18	Lynchburg, Virginia	Confederate Department of Southwest Virginia and Second Corps, Army of Northern Virginia, Union Army of West Virginia	Confederate 200, Union 700
June 21–23	Jerusalem Plank Road, Virginia	Confederate Army of Northern Virginia, Union Army of the Potomac	Confederate 572, Union 2,962
June 22	Kolb's Farm, Georgia	Confederate Army of Tennessee, Union Army of the Ohio and XX Corps	Confederate 1,000, Union 350
June 24	Saint Mary's Church (Samaria Church), Virginia	Cavalry corps from Confederate Army of Northern Virginia and Union Army of the Potomac	Confederate 250, Union 350
June 25	Staunton River Bridge, Virginia	Confederate Home Guards, Union cavalry division from Army of the Potomac	150 total
June 27	Kennesaw Mountain, Georgia	Confederate Army of Tennessee, Union Military Division of the Mississippi	Confederate 1,000, Union 3,000
June 28	Sappony Church, Virginia	Cavalry from Confederate Army of Northern Virginia and Union Army of the Potomac	unknown
June 29	Reams Station I, Virginia	Cavalry from Confederate Army of Northern Virginia and Union Army of the Potomac	unknown
July 9	Monocacy, Maryland	Confederate Army of the Valley District, Union Middle Department	Confederate 700–900, Union 1,294
July 11–12	Fort Stevens, District of Columbia	Confederate Army of the Valley, Union Department of Washington	Confederate 500, Union 373
July 14–15	Tupelo, Mississippi	Confederate Forrest's Cavalry Corps, Union Right Wing, 16th Army Corps	Confederate 1,326, Union 674.
July 17–18	Cool Spring, Virginia	Confederate Army of the Valley District, Union Army of West Virginia	Confederate 397, Union 422
July 18	Bartram's Shop, Mississippi	Confederate Forrest's Cavalry Corps, Union Right Wing, 16th Army Corps	Confederate unknown, Union 36
July 20	Rutherford's Farm, Virginia	Confederate detachment from Army of the Valley, Union cavalry division from Army of West Virginia	Confederate 500, Union 242
July 20	Peachtree Creek, Georgia	Confederate Army of Tennessee, Union Army of the Cumberland	Confederate 4,796, Union 1,710
July 22	Atlanta, Georgia	Confederate Army of Tennessee, Union Army of the Tennessee	Confederate 8,499, Union 3,641
July 24	Second Kernstown, Virginia	Confederate Army of the Valley, Union Army of West Virginia	Confederate 600, Union 1,185
July 27–29	First Deep Bottom, Virginia	Confederate Army of Northern Virginia, Union II Corps and cavalry from Army of the Potomac	1,000 total
July 28	Ezra Church, Georgia	Confederate Army of Tennessee, Union XV Corps	Confederate 4,642, Union 700
July 28–29	Killdeer Mountain, Dakota Territory	Union Department of the Northwest, Lakota and Dakota Sioux tribes	Union 15, Dakotas and Lakotas 31
July 30	The Crater, Virginia	Confederate Army of Northern Virginia, Union Army of the Potomac	Confederate 1,491, Union 3,798
August 1	Folck's Mill, Maryland	Confederate cavalry from Army of the Valley, Union garrison from Army of West Virginia	Confederate 30, Union 30
August 5	Mobile Bay, Alabama	Confederate and Union naval forces	Confederate 1,500, Union 327
August 5–7	Utoy Creek, Georgia	Confederate Army of Tennessee, Union Army of the Ohio	Confederate 225, Union 400
August 7	Moorefield, West Virginia	Cavalry from Union Army of West Virginia and Confederate Army of the Valley	Confederate 500, Union 31
August 7–9	Badlands, Dakota Territory	Union Department of the Northwest, Lakota and Dakota Sioux tribes	Union 9 killed and at least 100 wounded, Dakotas and Lakotas 100 killed.
August 13–20	Second Deep Bottom, Virginia	Confederate Army of Northern Virginia, Union Army of the Potomac	Confederate 1,300, Union 2,900
August 14–15	Dalton II, Georgia	Confederate Army of Tennessee, Union Army of the Tennessee, Army of the Cumberland, and Army of the Ohio	unknown
August 16	Guard Hill, Virginia	Confederate Army of the Valley District, Union Army of the Shenandoah	Confederate 480, Union 71
August 18–21	Globe Tavern, Virginia	Confederate Army of Northern Virginia, Union Army of the Potomac	Confederate 1,600, Union 4,455
August 20	Lovejoy's Station, Georgia	Confederate Army of Tennessee, Union Army of the Tennessee, Army of the Cumberland, and Army of the Ohio	Confederate 240, Union 237
August 21	Summit Point and Cameron's Depot, West Virginia	Confederate Army of the Valley District, Union Army of the Shenandoah	Confederate 400, Union 600
August 21	Second Memphis, Tennessee	Confederate Forrest's Cavalry Corps, Union garrison	Confederate 62, Union 80
August 25	Second Reams Station, Virginia	Confederate Third Corps, Army of Northern Virginia, Union II Corps and cavalry, Army of the Potomac	Confederate 814, Union 2,742
August 28–29	Smithfield Crossing, West Virginia	Confederate Army of the Valley District, Union Army of the Shenandoah	Confederate 200, Union 100
August 29–30	Chaffin's Farm, Virginia	Confederate Army of Northern Virginia, Union Army of the Potomac	Confederate 1,700, Union 3,300
August 29–30	New Market Heights, Virginia	Confederate Army of Northern Virginia, Union Army of the Potomac	Confederate 50, Union 850
August 31 – September 1	Jonesboro, Georgia	Confederate Army of Tennessee, Union Army of the Tennessee, Army of the Cumberland, and Army of the Ohio	Confederate 2,000, Union 1,149
September 3–4	Berryville, Virginia	Confederate Army of the Valley District, Union Army of the Shenandoah	Confederate 195, Union 312
September 19	Third Winchester, Virginia	Confederate Army of the Valley, Union Army of the Shenandoah	Confederate 3,610, Union 5,020
September 19	Cabin Creek, Indian Territory	Confederate cavalry, Union garrison	unknown
September 21–22	Fisher's Hill, Virginia	Confederate Army of the Valley, Union Army of the Shenandoah	Confederate 1,235, Union 528
September 26–28	Pilot Knob, Missouri	Confederate Army of Missouri, Union Missouri State Militia and volunteer troops	Confederate 1,500, Union 73
September 27	Fort Davidson, Missouri	Confederate Army of Missouri, Union garrison	Confederate 1,500, Union 183
September 29–30	Chaffin's Farm, Virginia	Union Army of the James, Confederate II Corps, Army of Northern Virginia	Confederate 1,300, Union 2,869
October 2	Pebbles' Farm, Virginia	Confederate Third Corps, Army of Northern Virginia, Union V Corps, Army of the Potomac	Confederate 1,300, Union 2,869
October 3	Big Shanty, Georgia	Confederate Army of Tennessee, Union garrison	Confederate none, Union 175 (captured)
October 5	Allatoona, Georgia	Confederate division from Army of Tennessee, Union garrison from XV Corps	Confederate 799, Union 706
October 7	Darbytown and New Market Roads, Virginia	Confederate Army of Northern Virginia, Union Army of the Potomac	Confederate 700, Union 458
October 9	Tom's Brook, Virginia	Confederate cavalry from the Army of the Valley, Union cavalry from the Union Army of the Shenandoah	Confederate 350, Union 57
October 13	Darbytown Road, Virginia	Confederate Army of Northern Virginia, Union X Corps	Confederate 50, Union 437
October 15	Glasgow, Missouri	Confederate Army of Missouri, Union garrison	Confederate 50, Union 400
October 19	Cedar Creek, Virginia	Confederate Army of the Valley, Union Army of the Shenandoah	Confederate 2,910, Union 5,672
October 19	Second Lexington, Missouri	Confederate Army of Missouri, Union detachment of Army of the Border	Unknown
October 21	Little Blue River, Missouri	Confederate Army of Missouri, Union detachment of Army of the Border	Unknown
October 21 – 22	Second Independence, Missouri	Confederate Army of Missouri, Union Army of the Border	Confederate approximately 140, Union unknown
October 22 – 23	Byram's Ford, Missouri	Confederate Army of Missouri, Union Army of the Border	Unknown
October 23	Westport, Missouri	Confederate Army of Missouri, Union Army of the Border	Confederate 1,500, Union 1,500
October 25	Mine Creek, Kansas	Confederate Army of Missouri, Union Army of the Border	Confederate 800, Union 150
October 25	Marmiton River, Missouri	Confederate Army of Missouri, Union cavalry from Army of the Border	Unknown
October 26 – 29	Decatur, Alabama	Confederate Army of Tennessee, Union garrison and other troops	Confederate 200, Union 155
October 27 – 28	Fair Oaks and Darbytown Road, Virginia	Confederate detachments from Army of Northern Virginia, Union Army of the James	Confederate less than 100, Union 1,603
October 27 – 28	Boydton Plank Road, Virginia	Confederate Third Corps, Army of Northern Virginia, Union Army of the Potomac	Confederate 1,300, Union 1,758
October 28	Ladiga, Alabama	Cavalry brigade from Confederate Army of Tennessee, Cavalry division from Union Department of the Cumberland	Confederate unknown, Union 25
October 28	Second Newtonia, Missouri	Cavalry from Union Army of the Border and Confederate Army of Missouri	Confederate 250, Union 400
November 4 – 5	Johnsonville, Tennessee	Confederate Forrest's Cavalry Corps, Union garrison	Unknown
November 11 – 14	Bull's Gap, Tennessee	Confederate Department of Southwest Virginia, Union garrison	Confederate 100, Union 24 (including 300 prisoners)
November 22	Griswoldville, Georgia	Confederate militia, Union Grand Army of the West	Confederate 650, Union 62
November 24 – 29	Columbia, Tennessee	Confederate Army of Tennessee, Union IV Corps and XXIII Corps	unknown
November 28	Buck Head Creek, Georgia	Cavalry from Confederate Department of South Carolina, Georgia, and Florida and Union Grand Army of the West	Confederate 600, Union 46
November 29	Sand Creek, Colorado	Union 1st Colorado Cavalry and 3rd Colorado Cavalry, Southern Cheyenne and Southern Arapaho	Union 48, Southern Cheyenne and Southern Arapaho 150
November 29	Spring Hill, Tennessee	Confederate Army of Tennessee, Union IV Corps and XXIII Corps	Confederates 500, Union 350
November 30	Second Franklin, Tennessee	Confederate Army of Tennessee, Union IV Corps and XXIII Corps	Confederate 7,300, Union 2,655
December 4	LaVergne, Tennessee	Confederate Forrest's Cavalry Corps, Union garrison	Confederate none, Union 150 (all captured)
December 4	Overall Creek, Tennessee	Detachments of Confederate Army of Tennessee and Union Department of the Cumberland	Confederate 86, Union unknown
December 5–7	Third Murfreesboro, Tennessee	Confederate detachment from Army of Tennessee, Union garrison	Confederate 214, Union 208
December 15	Fort McAllister	Confederate Department of South Carolina, Georgia, and Florida and Union Grand Army of the West	Confederate 230, Union 134
December 15–16	Nashville, Tennessee	Confederate Army of Tennessee, Union Army of the Cumberland	Confederate 6,500, Union 3,061
December 17–18	Marion, Virginia	Confederate Department of Southwest Virginia, Union cavalry	300 total
December 20–21	Second Saltville, Virginia	Confederate Department of Southwest Virginia, Union cavalry	unknown
December 24	Richland Creek, Tennessee	Confederate Forrest's Cavalry Corps, Union cavalry, Army of the Cumberland	Confederate 6, Union unknown
December 24–27	Fort Fisher I, North Carolina	Confederate Cape Fear District, Department of North Carolina, Union Fort Fisher Expeditionary Force, Army of the James	Confederate 261, Union 59
December 25	Pulaski, Tennessee	Confederate Forrest's Cavalry Corps, Union cavalry, Army of the Cumberland	unknown
December 26	Sugar Creek, Tennessee	Confederate Forrest's Cavalry Corps, Union cavalry, Army of the Cumberland	Confederate unknown, Union 162

== See also ==
- 1864 in the United States
