= Second Battle of Petersburg =

1864 battle of the American Civil War

- Part of the American Civil War
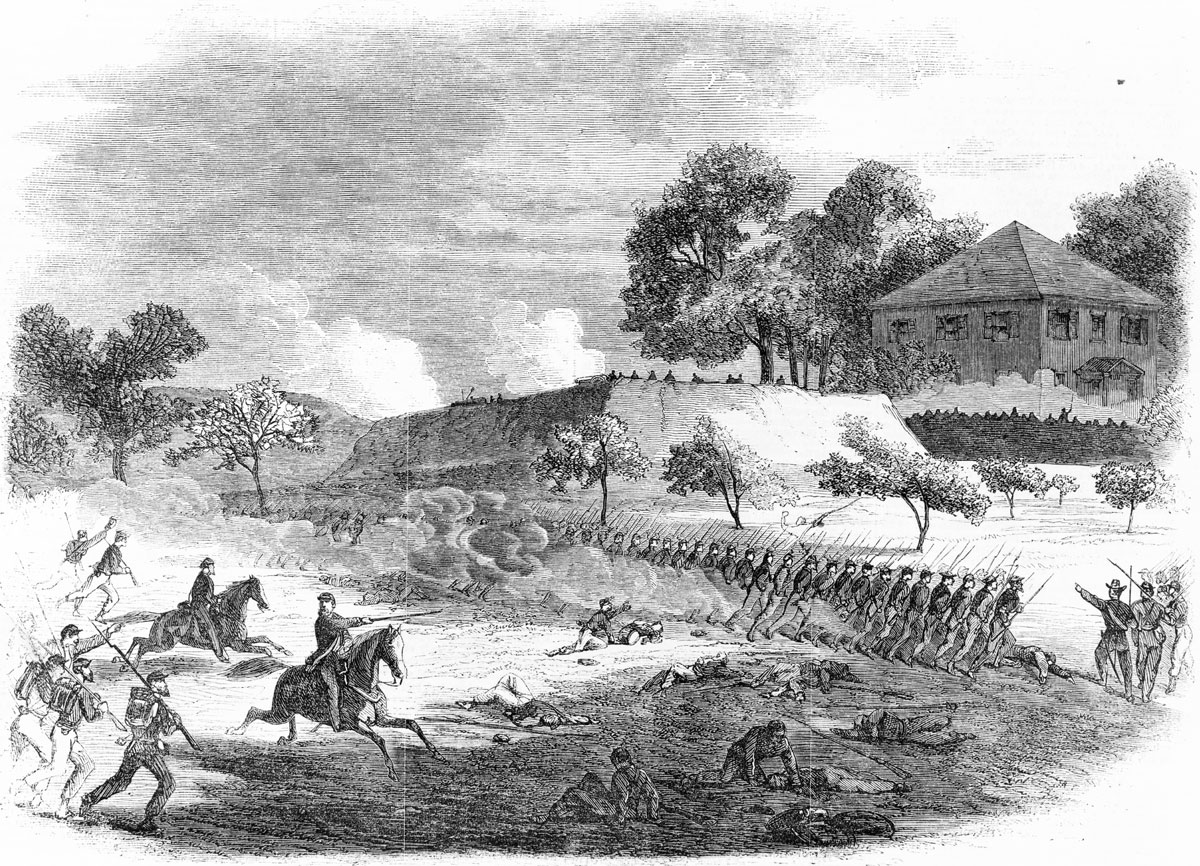
- The war in Virginia – the 18th Army Corps storming a fort on the right of the Rebel line before Petersburg, June 15, sketch by Edwin Forbes (Dunn House at the Confederate Dimmock Line)
Date	June 15, 1864 – June 18, 1864
Location	Petersburg / Prince George County, Virginia 37.221°N 77.378°W
Result	Confederate victory

Belligerents
United States (Union)	CSA (Confederacy)

Commanders and leaders
Ulysses S. Grant; George G. Meade; Benjamin Butler	Robert E. Lee; P. G. T. Beauregard

Units involved
Army of the Potomac Army of the James	Army of Northern Virginia

Strength
13,700–62,000 (reinforcements arrived over four days)	5,400–38,000

Casualties and losses
11,386 total (1,688 killed, 8,513 wounded, 1,185 missing or captured)	4,000 total (200 killed, 2,900 wounded, 900 missing or captured)

The Second Battle of Petersburg, also known as the assault on Petersburg, was fought June 15–18, 1864, at the beginning of the Richmond–Petersburg Campaign (popularly known as the Siege of Petersburg). Union forces under Lieutenant General Ulysses S. Grant and Major General George G. Meade attempted to capture Petersburg, Virginia, before General Robert E. Lee's Confederate Army of Northern Virginia could reinforce the city.

The four days included repeated Union assaults against substantially smaller forces commanded by General P. G. T. Beauregard. Beauregard's strong defensive positions and poorly coordinated actions by the Union generals (notably Major General William F. "Baldy" Smith, who squandered the best opportunity for success on June 15) made up for the disparity in the sizes of the armies. By June 18, the arrival of significant reinforcements from Lee's army made further assaults impractical. The failure of the Union to defeat the Confederates in these actions resulted in the start of the ten-month Siege of Petersburg.

== Background ==
The First Battle of Petersburg occurred on June 9, when Major General Benjamin Butler dispatched 4,500 troops from his Army of the James in the Bermuda Hundred area and assaulted the Dimmock Line, the outer line of earthworks protecting Petersburg. The Confederates, under the overall command of General P. G. T. Beauregard, numbered 2,500, many of whom were teenage boys and elderly men. Timid leadership on the part of Union Major General Quincy A. Gillmore and Brigadier General August Kautz led to the failure of the assault, squandering a prime opportunity to seize lightly defended Petersburg. Butler's men returned to their positions in Bermuda Hundred.

After the Battle of Cold Harbor in Lieutenant General Ulysses S. Grant's 1864 Overland Campaign, the Union Army of the Potomac slipped away from General Robert E. Lee and began crossing the James River. Although the Overland Campaign's objective had been to defeat Lee's Army of Northern Virginia in a decisive battle, Grant changed his objective to be the city of Petersburg, an important rail junction that controlled the supplies leading to the Confederate capital of Richmond. Grant knew that Lee could not protect Richmond if Petersburg fell and he would be forced to battle Grant in the open. He also knew from the unsuccessful first assaults on June 9 how weak the Petersburg defenses actually were. Speed was essential to Grant's plan, requiring success before Lee realized Grant's objective and could reinforce Petersburg. Lee was not in fact fully cognizant of Grant's moves until June 18, assuming until then that Grant would target Richmond. Beauregard, however, had been loudly warning of the danger to Petersburg since June 9.

Grant selected Butler's Army of the James, which had performed poorly in the Bermuda Hundred Campaign, to lead the expedition toward Petersburg. On June 14 he directed Butler to augment the XVIII Corps, commanded by Brigadier General William F. "Baldy" Smith, to a strength of 16,000 men, including Kautz's cavalry division, and use the same route employed in the unsuccessful attacks of June 9. The II Corps of the Army of the Potomac, commanded by Major General Winfield S. Hancock, would follow Smith. Grant wrote in his post-war memoirs, "I believed then, and still believe, that Petersburg could have been easily captured at that time."

One advantage for the Confederates was the strength of the Dimmock Line, formidable artillery positions connected by earthworks and trenches for over 10 miles (16 km), circling the city and anchored on the Appomattox River to the east and west. Since Beauregard had insufficient men available to defend the entire line, he concentrated 2,200 troops under Brigadier General Henry A. Wise in the northeastern sector, between Redan number 1 on the Appomattox River and Redan number 23, protecting the Norfolk and Petersburg Railroad to the southeast. Even with this concentration, infantrymen were spaced 10 feet (3.0 m) apart. His remaining 3,200 men were facing Butler's army at Bermuda Hundred.

== Opposing forces ==
Opposing commanders
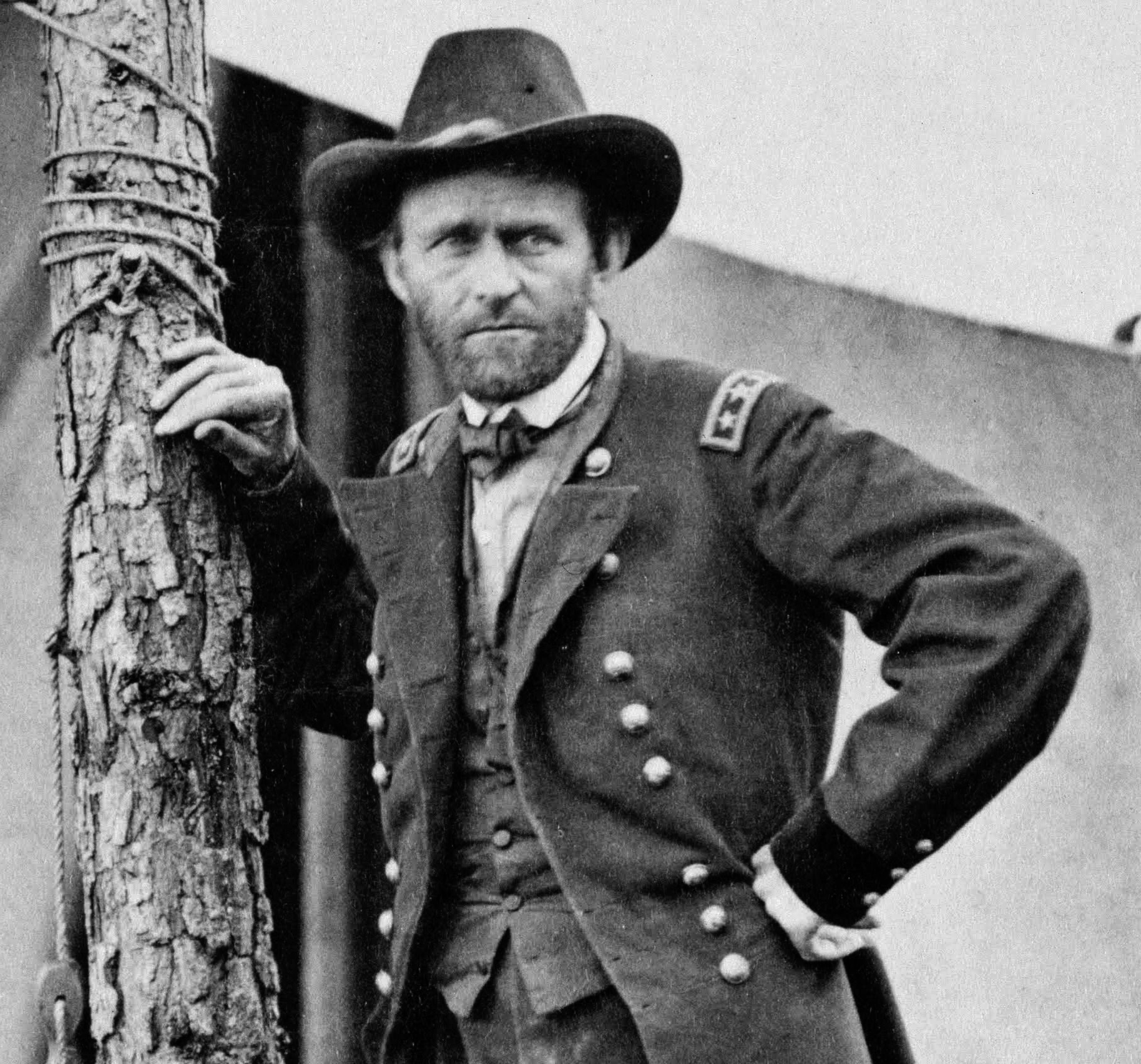
Ltg.
Ulysses S. Grant, USA

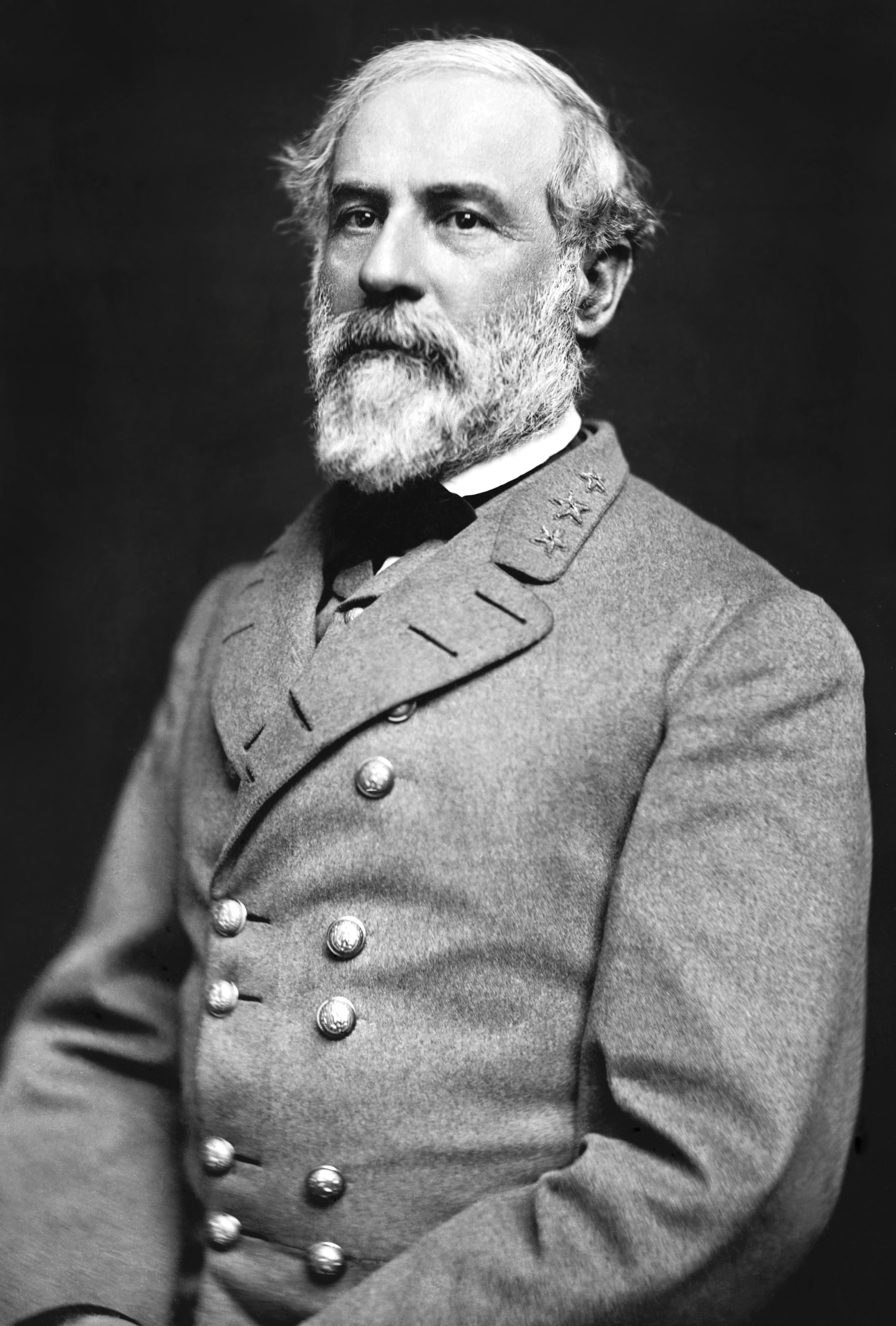
General
Robert E. Lee, CSA

== Battle ==
=== June 15 ===
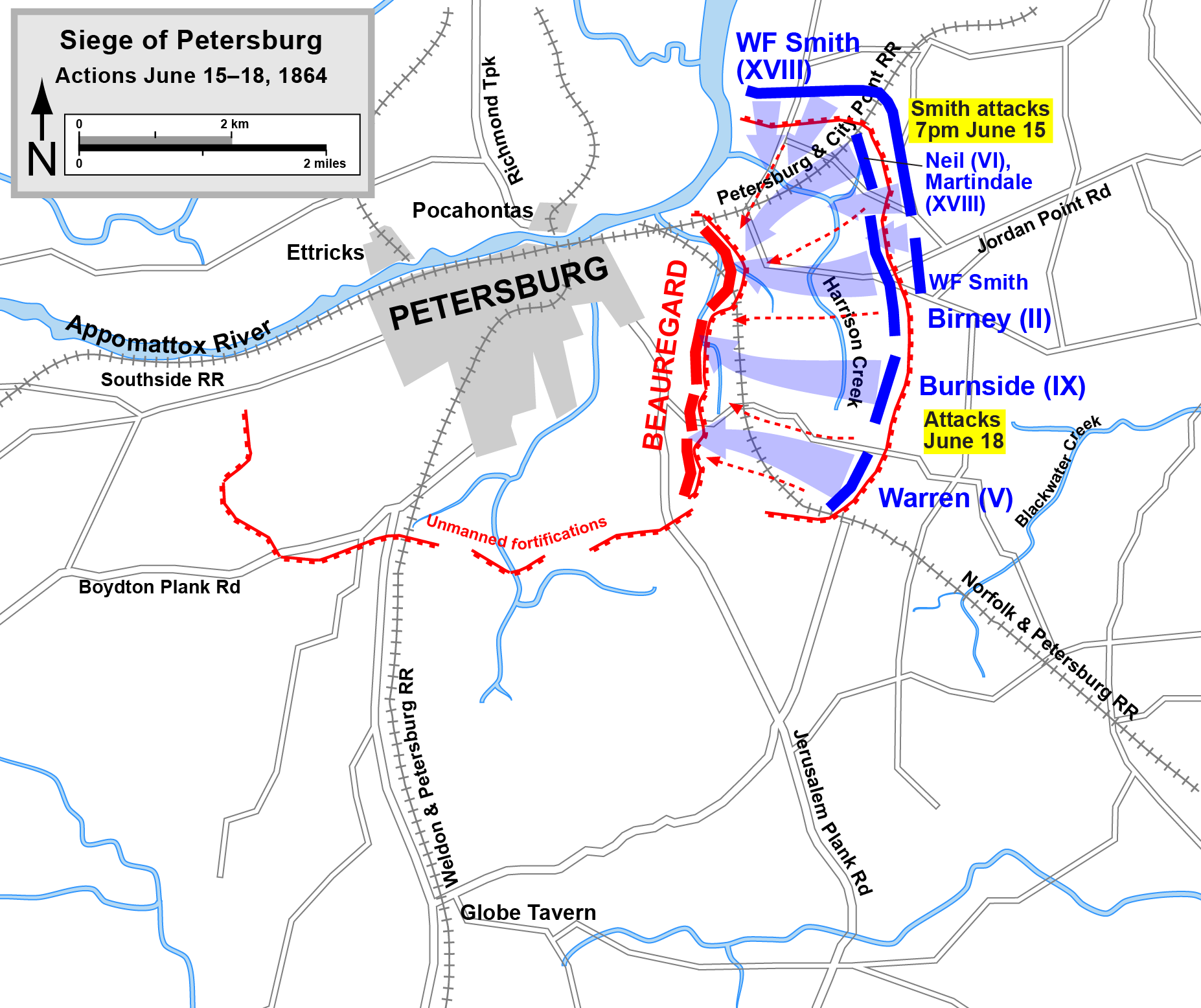
Siege of Petersburg, assaults on June 15–18, 1864 Confederate Union

Baldy Smith and his men crossed the Appomattox shortly after dawn on June 15. His force consisted of the infantry divisions of Brigadier Generals. William T. H. Brooks, John H. Martindale, and Edward W. Hinks, and the cavalry division of Brigadier General August Kautz. The transport vessels delivered these divisions almost at random to landing sites on the opposite shore, confusing Smith's plans and wasting time reorganizing. Kautz's cavalry division was ordered to clear the line of advance for the infantry, Brooks and Martindale would march down the City Point Railroad, and Hinks's U.S. Colored Troops would approach on the Jordan Point Road.

Delays in the advance continued after the landing. The cavalry encountered an unexpected stronghold at Baylor's farm northeast of Petersburg. Hinks's men launched two attacks on the Confederates and captured a cannon, but the overall advance was delayed until early afternoon. Smith performed a reconnaissance and, despite his sense of nervousness about the strength of the enemy position, planned to carry the defensive works with a strong skirmish line. He was delayed again when his artillery commander allowed all of the horses to be watered simultaneously, making it impossible to bring up his guns until about 7 p.m.

While Smith was delaying, Kautz reached the railroad near Redan number 20 on the right flank of the Confederate line around noon. Approximately 600 Confederates under Brigadier General James Dearing bombarded Kautz with artillery and the Union cavalrymen got no closer than 500 yards (460 m) from the line. In a manner similar to the June 9 battle, Kautz listened for evidence that Smith was attacking to his right and, hearing none, gave up and withdrew.

When Smith finally started his attack, his skirmishers swept over the earthworks on a 3.5-mile (5.6 km) front, capturing Batteries 3 and 5–11, causing the Confederates to retreat to a weaker defensive line on Harrison's Creek. Despite this initial success and the prospect of a virtually undefended city immediately to his front, Smith decided to wait until dawn to resume his attack. By this time Winfield Hancock had arrived at Smith's headquarters. The normally decisive and pugnacious Hancock, who outranked Smith, was uncertain of his orders and the disposition of forces, and uncharacteristically deferred to Smith's judgment to wait. Smith's timid service on June 15 would turn out to be his last combat command. Butler indirectly accused Smith of "dilatoriness" and the dispute escalated to Grant. Although Grant originally contemplated replacing Butler by Smith as commander of the Army of the James, he eventually retained Butler and reassigned Smith to New York to await further orders, which were never issued.

Beauregard wrote later that Petersburg "at that hour was clearly at the mercy of the Federal commander, who had all but captured it." But he used the time he had been granted to good advantage. Receiving no guidance from Richmond in response to his urgent requests, he unilaterally decided to strip his defenses from the Howlett Line, which was bottling up Butler's army in Bermuda Hundred, making the divisions of Major Generals Robert Hoke and Bushrod Johnson available for the new Petersburg defensive line. Butler might have used this opportunity to move his army between Petersburg and Richmond, which would have doomed the Confederate capital, but he once again failed to act.

=== June 16 ===
By the morning of June 16, Beauregard had concentrated about 14,000 men in his defensive line, but this paled in comparison to the 50,000 Federals that now faced him. Grant had arrived with Major General Ambrose Burnside's IX Corps, addressed the confusion of Hancock's orders, and ordered a reconnaissance for weak points in the defensive line. Hancock, in temporary command of the Army of the Potomac until Major General George G. Meade arrived, prepared Smith's XVIII Corps on the right, his own II Corps in the center, and Burnside's IX Corps on the left.

Hancock's assault began around 5:30 p.m. as all three corps moved slowly forward. Beauregard's men fought fiercely, erecting new breastworks to the rear as breakthroughs occurred. Upon the arrival of General Meade, a second attack was ordered and Brigadier General Francis C. Barlow led his division against Redans 13, 14, and 15. Confederate artillery fire caused significant Union casualties, including the death of Colonel Patrick Kelly, commander of the famous Irish Brigade. Although Barlow's men managed to capture their objectives, a counterattack drove them back, taking numerous Union prisoners. The survivors dug in close to the enemy works.

=== June 17 ===
June 17 was a day of uncoordinated Union attacks, starting on the left flank where two brigades of Burnside's IX Corps under Brigadier General Robert B. Potter stealthily approached the Confederate line and launched a surprise attack at dawn. Initially successful, it captured nearly a mile of the Confederate fortifications and about 600 prisoners, but the effort eventually failed when Potter's men moved forward to find another line of entrenchments. Their mobility was limited because of tangled logs in a ravine behind them and Confederate guns were able to strike them with enfilade fire.

At 2 p.m., the IX Corps launched a second attack, led by the brigade of Brigadier General John F. Hartranft. They were somehow sent forward at a right angle to the Confederate line, which left them vulnerable to enfilading fire. In the evening, Brigadier General James H. Ledlie's division also failed in its assault, during which Ledlie was observed to be drunk (a behavioral pattern that would repeat itself notoriously at the Battle of the Crater).

We find the enemy, as usual, in a very strong position, defended by earthworks, and it looks very much as if we will have to go through a siege of Petersburg before entering on the siege of Richmond. ... Well, it is all in the cruise, as the sailors say.

— Major General George G. Meade, letter to his wife, June 17

During the day, Beauregard's engineers had laid out new defensive positions a mile to the west of the Dimmock Line, running along a creek named Taylor's Branch to the Appomattox. Late that night the Confederates pulled back to their new position. Beauregard expressed his frustration with the lack of support or concern from Robert E. Lee, writing years after the war, "The Army of Northern Virginia was yet far distant, and I had failed to convince its distinguished commander of the fact that I was then fighting Grant's whole army with less than eleven thousand men." Lee had systematically ignored all of Beauregard's pleas and it was not until his own son, cavalry Major General W.H.F. "Rooney" Lee, had verified Grant's movements across the river, that he acknowledged the current perilous situation at Petersburg. He immediately dispatched two divisions of his men, exhausted from the Overland Campaign, to Petersburg, beginning at 3 a.m. on June 18.

=== June 18 ===
With the arrival of Lee's two divisions, under Major General Joseph B. Kershaw and Charles W. Field, Beauregard had over 20,000 men to defend the city, but Grant's force had been augmented by the arrival of Major General Gouverneur K. Warren's V Corps and 67,000 Federals were present. The first Union attack began at dawn, started by the II and XVIII Corps on the Union right. Hancock began to suffer effects from his lingering Gettysburg wound and he turned over command of the II Corps to Major General David B. Birney. The men of the II Corps were surprised to make rapid progress against the Confederate line, not realizing that Beauregard had moved it back the night before. When they encountered the second line, the attack immediately ground to a halt and the corps suffered under heavy Confederate fire for hours.

By noon, the IX and V Corps, which had a longer distance to march to join the attack, came up alongside the II Corps. Major General Orlando B. Willcox's division of the IX Corps led a renewed attack but it suffered significant losses in the marsh and open fields crossed by Taylor's Branch. Willcox's division emerged with only 1,000 men standing. Warren's V Corps was halted by murderous fire from Rives's Salient (also known as Battery 27, the position where the Dimmock Line crossed the Jerusalem Plank Road, present-day U.S. Route 301), an attack in which Colonel Joshua Lawrence Chamberlain, commanding the First Brigade, First Division, V Corps, was severely wounded. His wound was believed to be mortal and Chamberlain was granted a battlefield promotion to brigadier general by General Grant. At 6:30 p.m., Meade ordered a final assault, which also failed with more horrendous losses. One of the leading regiments was the 1st Maine Heavy Artillery Regiment, 900 men that had been converted from essentially garrison duty manning artillery to be infantrymen at the start of the Overland Campaign. The regiment quickly lost 632 men in the assault, the heaviest single-battle loss of any regiment during the entire war.

== Aftermath ==
It is a source of great regret that I am not able to report more success.

— Major General George G. Meade, report to Lieutenant General Grant, June 18

Having achieved almost no gains from four days of assaults, Meade ordered his army to dig in. Union casualties were 11,386 (1,688 killed, 8,513 wounded, 1,185 missing or captured), Confederate 4,000 (200 killed, 2,900 wounded, 900 missing or captured). Grant's opportunity to take Petersburg easily had been lost, but Lee, who arrived at Petersburg around noon on June 18, was unable to prevent the Union army from laying siege to the city.

Historians generally argue that the battle itself was a Confederate victory. Historian Sean Michael Chick has asserted: "In spite of having outmaneuvered Lee, after three days of battle in which the Confederates at Petersburg were severely outnumbered, Union forces failed to take the city, and their final, futile attack on the fourth day only added to already staggering casualties. By holding Petersburg against great odds, the Confederacy arguably won its last great strategic victory of the Civil War". Nevertheless, after the battle, the resulting siege of the city would last until April 1865.

== Preservation ==
The Petersburg National Battlefield covers only part of the battlegrounds around Petersburg. The American Battlefield Trust and its partners have preserved 131 additional acres of the Petersburg battlefield through mid-2023.

== See also ==
- Troop engagements of the American Civil War, 1864
- Overland Campaign
- Battle of Cold Harbor
- Siege of Petersburg
- List of costliest American Civil War land battles
