= Francis Morrison =

American Civil War soldier

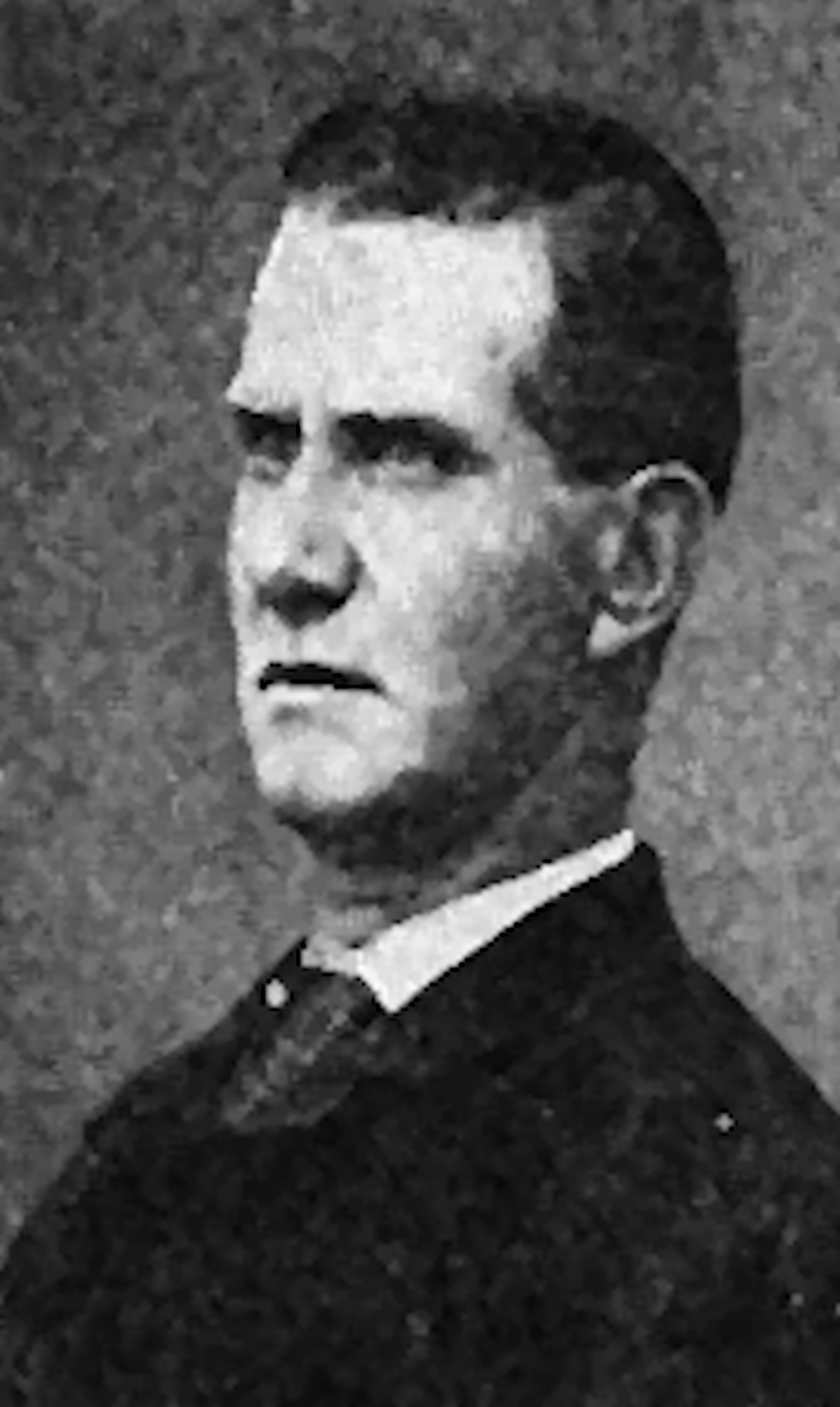
- Born: January 15, 1845; Ohiopyle, Pennsylvania
- Died: April 30, 1913 (aged 68)
- Burial place: Ohiopyle, Pennsylvania
- Military career
- Allegiance: United States of America
- Branch: United States Army; Union Army
- Rank: Private
- Units: Company H, 85th Pennsylvania Infantry
- Conflicts: Bermuda Hundred Campaign; American Civil War
- Awards: Medal of Honor

Private Francis Morrison (January 15, 1845 - April 30, 1913) was an American soldier who fought in the American Civil War. Morrison received his country's highest award for bravery during combat, the Medal of Honor. Morrison's medal was won for his actions in the Bermuda Hundred Campaign on June 17, 1864. He was honored with the award on April 4, 1898.

Morrison was born in Ohiopyle, Pennsylvania, entered service in Drakestown, Pennsylvania, and was buried in Ohiopyle.

== Medal of Honor citation ==
The President of the United States of America, in the name of Congress, takes pleasure in presenting the Medal of Honor to Private Francis Morrison, United States Army, for extraordinary heroism on 17 June 1864, while serving with Company H, 85th Pennsylvania Infantry, in action at Bermuda Hundred, Virginia. Private Morrison voluntarily exposed himself to a heavy fire to bring off a wounded comrade.

== See also ==
- List of American Civil War Medal of Honor recipients: M–P
