= William E. Leonard =

- Born: c. 1836; Greene County, Pennsylvania
- Died: February 8, 1891 (aged 54–55); Greene County, Pennsylvania
- Burial place: Jacksonville Cemetery Wind Ridge, Pennsylvania
- Military career
- Allegiance: United States of America; Union
- Branch: United States Army; Union Army
- Rank: Private
- Units: Company F, 85th Pennsylvania Volunteer Infantry Regiment
- Conflicts: American Civil War
- Awards: Medal of Honor

William E. Leonard (c. 1836–February 8, 1891) was a Private in the Union Army and a Medal of Honor recipient for his actions in the American Civil War.

He is buried at Jacksonville Cemetery Wind Ridge, Pennsylvania.

== Medal of Honor citation ==
Rank and organization: Private, Company F, 85th Pennsylvania Infantry. Place and date: At Deep Bottom, Va., April 16, 1864. Entered service at: Jacksonville, Pa. Birth: Greene County, Pa. Date of issue: April 6, 1865.

Citation:

Capture of battle flag.

== See also ==
- List of Medal of Honor recipients
- List of American Civil War Medal of Honor recipients: G–L
