= Howlett Line =

Coordinates: 37°20.964′N 77°23.664′W

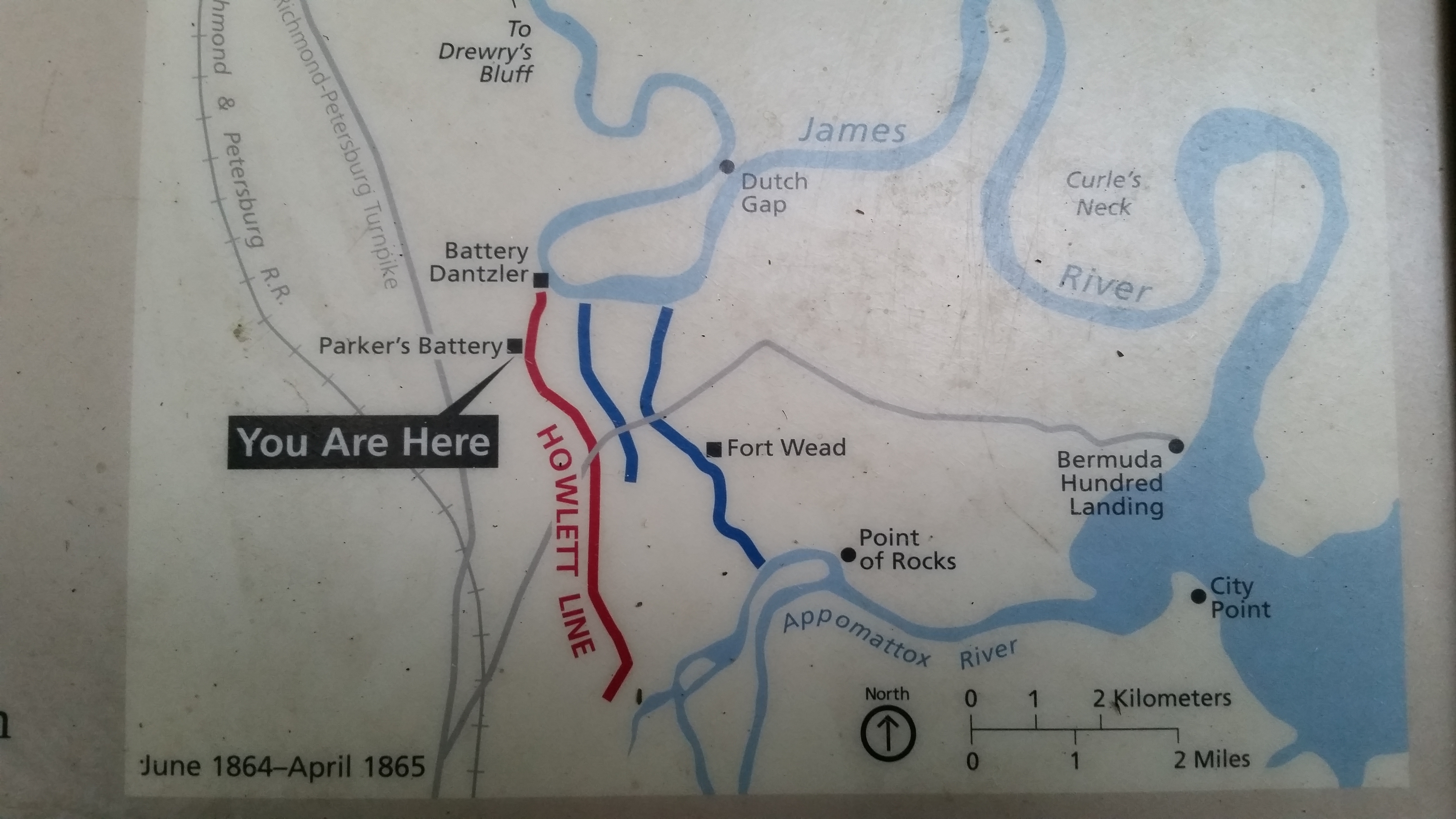
National Park Service marker located at Parker's Battery

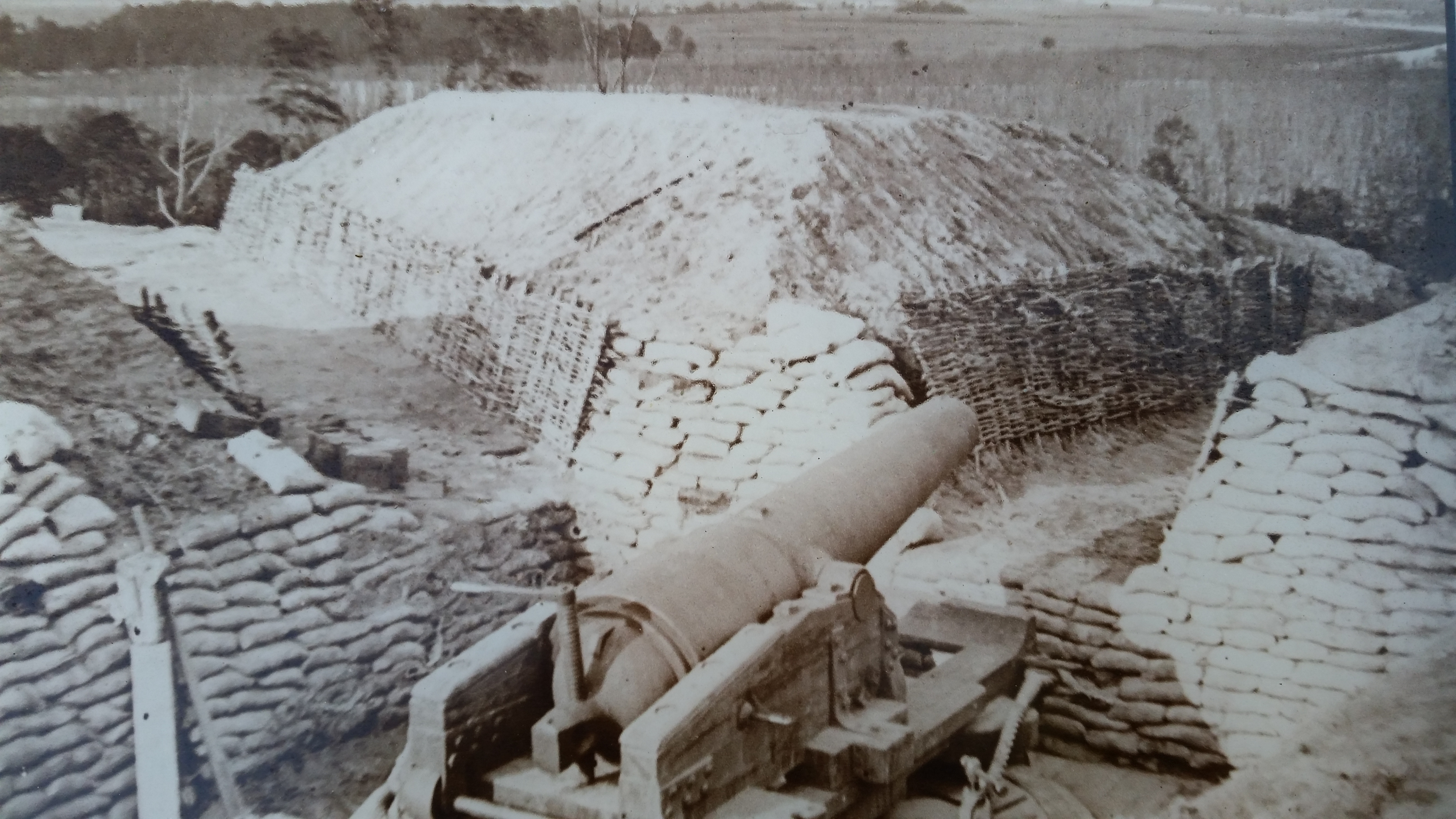
Battery Dantzler Civil War vintage photo

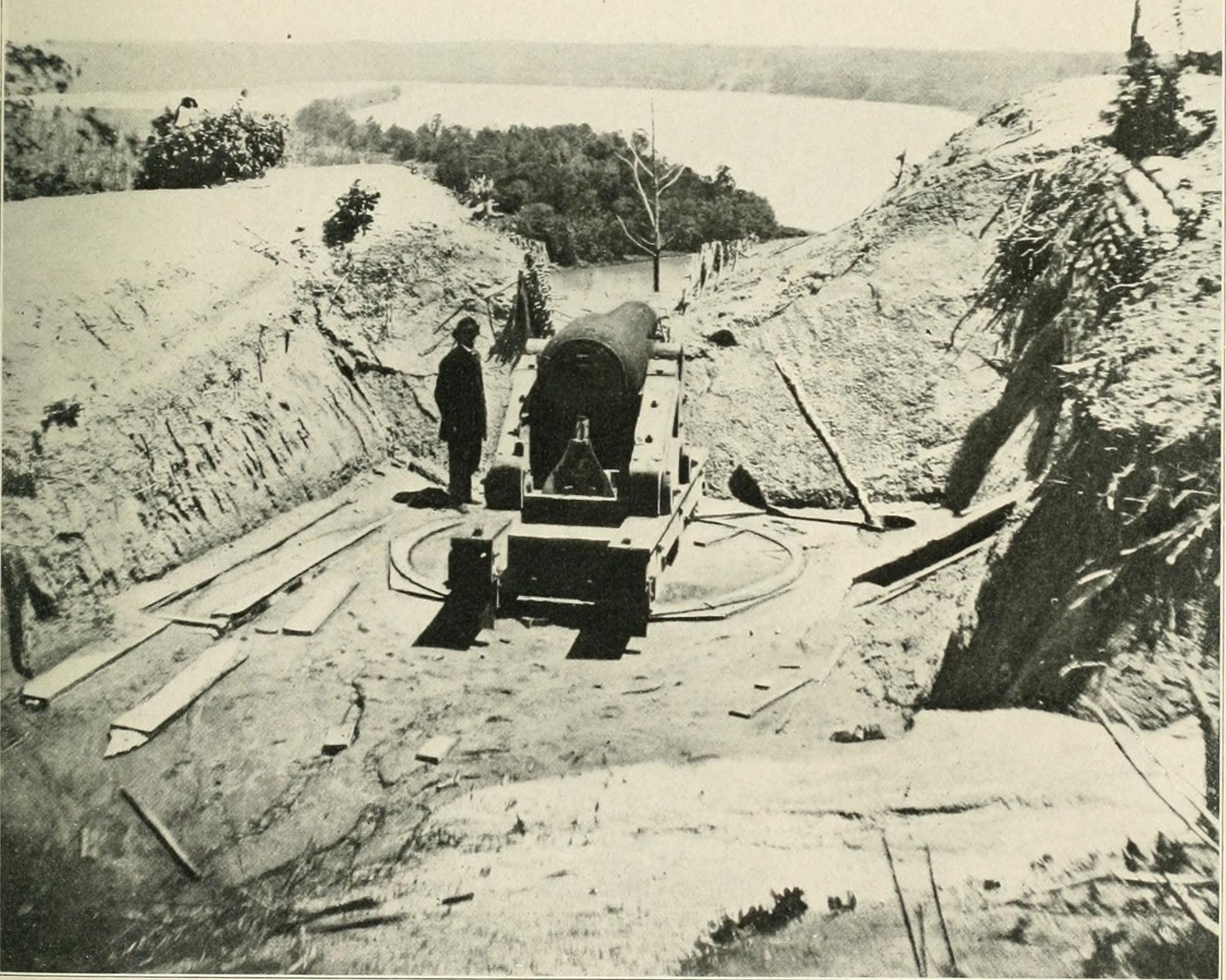
Another view of Battery Dantzler

The Howlett Line was a critical Confederate earthworks dug during the Bermuda Hundred Campaign of the United States Civil War in May 1864. Specifically, the line stretched across the Bermuda Hundred peninsula from the James River to the Appomattox River. It was named for the Dr. Howlett's House that overlooked the James River at the north end of the line. The Howlett Line became famous as the "Cork in the Bottle" by keeping the 30,000-man strong General Butler's Army of the James at bay.

== History ==
Following the Battle of Ware Bottom Church (May 20, 1864), the Confederates began digging a decisive set of defensive earthworks that became known as the Howlett Line. It continued for three miles from river to river and aimed to hold down the railroad and turnpike of crucial importance, which connected Richmond and Petersburg that were at the time slightly defended. Gen. Daniel H. Hill directed the construction of the Confederate fortifications.

In Personal Memoirs Gen. Ulysses S. Grant described a conversation with his Chief Engineer Gen. John G. Barnard regarding Butler's predicament:

He said that the general occupied a place between the James and Appomattox rivers which was of great strength, and where with an inferior force he could hold it for an indefinite length of time against a superior; but that he could do nothing offensively. I then asked him why Butler could not move out from his lines and push across the Richmond and Petersburg Railroad to the rear and on the south side of Richmond. He replied that it was impracticable, because the enemy had substantially the same line across the neck of land that General Butler had. He then took out his pencil and drew a sketch of the locality, remarking that the position was like a bottle and that Butler's line of intrenchments across the neck represented the cork; that the enemy had built an equally strong line immediately in front of him across the neck; and it was therefore as if Butler was in a bottle. He was perfectly safe against an attack; but, as Barnard expressed it, the enemy had corked the bottle and with a small force could hold the cork in its place.

— Ulysses S. Grant, Personal Memoirs

Battery Dantzler, called Howlett's Battery before it was renamed to honor Col. Olin M. Dantzler of the 22nd South Carolina, and Parker's Virginia Battery anchored the Howlett Line. During the Second Battle of Petersburg (June 15, 1864) Gen. P. G. T. Beauregard pulled part of the troops from the Howlett Line to reinforce his main defenses. Overall, the construction of Confederate fortifications and trenches known as the Howlett Line held Butler in place until General Robert E. Lee evacuated the position on April 2, 1865.

== Preservation ==
The Chesterfield Historical Society of Virginia works on preservation of the extant earthworks in the Howlett Line Park, which belongs to the Chesterfield County Parks System.

== See also ==
- Richmond National Battlefield Park
- Troop engagements of the American Civil War, 1864
