= Battle of Ware Bottom Church =

Part of the American Civil War in Virginia

- Part of the American Civil War
Date	May 20, 1864
Location	Chesterfield County, Virginia 37°20′40″N 77°23′29″W
Result	CSA (Confederate) victory

Belligerents
United States (Union)	(Confederate States of America) CSA (Confederacy)

Commanders and leaders
Benjamin Butler	P. G. T. Beauregard

Strength
12,000	15,500

Casualties and losses
702	700
- Location within Virginia

The Battle of Ware Bottom Church was fought on May 20, 1864, between Union and Confederate forces during the American Civil War. The Union troops were led by Benjamin Butler, while the Confederates were led by P.G.T. Beauregard. The Confederates were victorious, and Butler's forces remained in their Bermuda Hundred defenses. Following the battle, the Confederates began digging a critical set of defensive earthworks that became known as the Howlett Line.

== Ware Bottom Church ==
The church, one of the oldest in Virginia, was destroyed during the fighting. The church stood until June 18, 1864, when it became a source of annoyance for Parker's Virginia Battery, only a few hundred yards west of the church. Federal sharpshooters had been using the church to harass the gunners. In 2009, 2 acres of this historic site was donated to the Richmond Battlefields Association by a local company.

== Battlefield preservation ==
In addition to the acquisition of the two-acre historic site of Ware Bottom Church by the Richmond Battlefields Association, the Civil War Trust (a division of the American Battlefield Trust) and its partners have acquired and preserved 22 acres (0.089 km^{2}) of the battlefield.

== Gallery ==
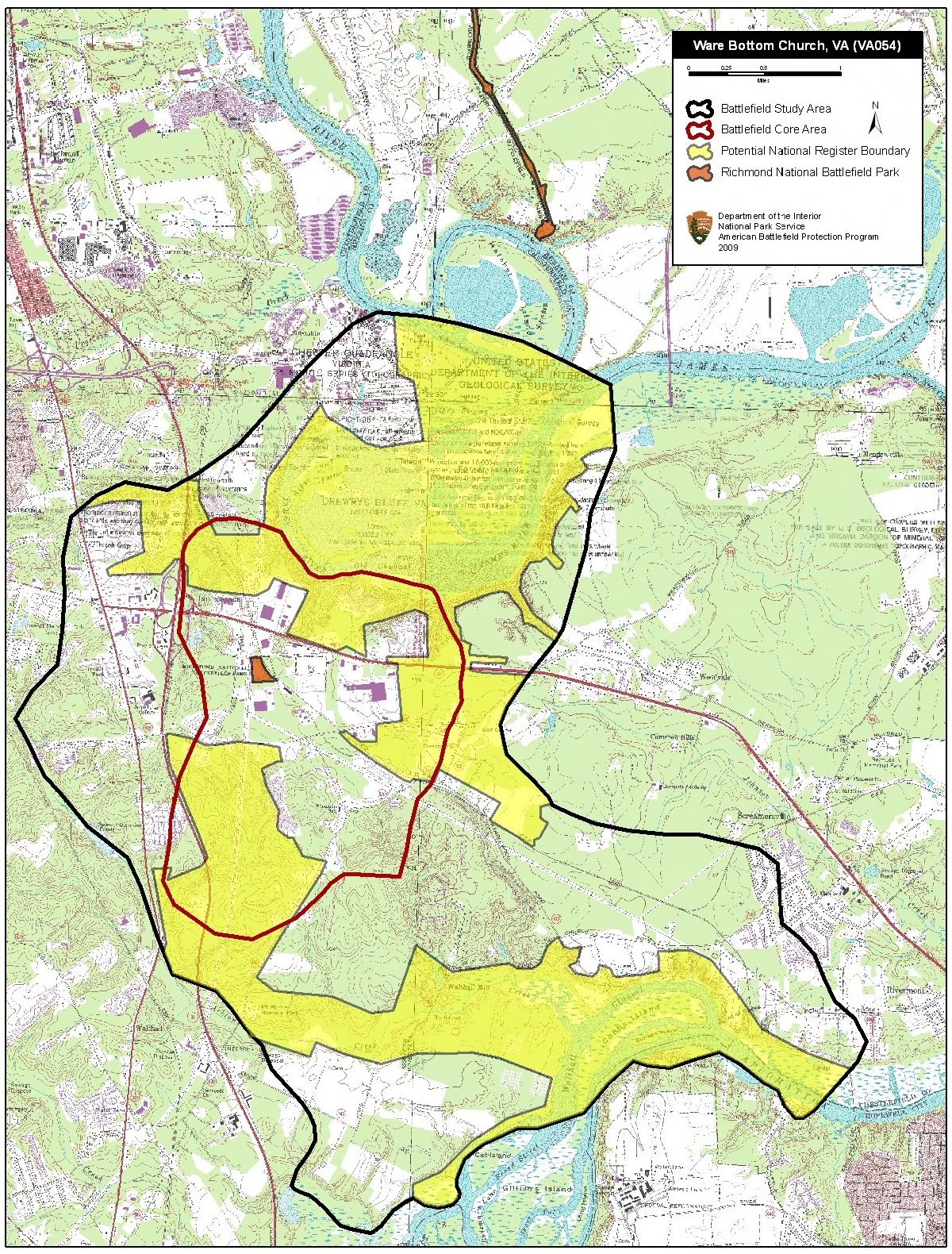
Map of battlefield core and study areas.
