= Bermuda Hundred campaign =

Part of the American Civil War in Virginia

Coordinates: 37.3432°N 77.3197°W

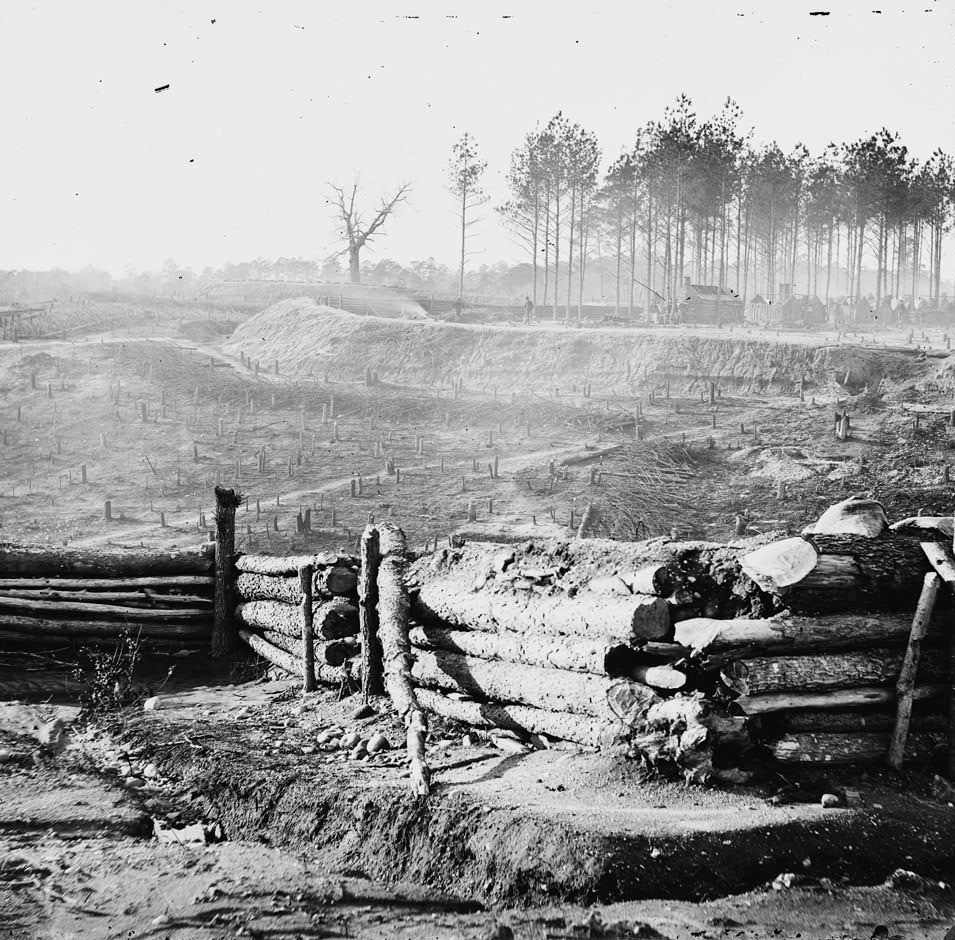
Federal earthworks at Bermuda Hundred

The Bermuda Hundred campaign was a series of battles fought at the town of Bermuda Hundred, outside Richmond, Virginia, during May 1864 in the American Civil War. Union Maj. Gen. Benjamin Butler, commanding the Army of the James, threatened Richmond from the east but was stopped by forces under Confederate Gen. P.G.T. Beauregard.

== Background ==
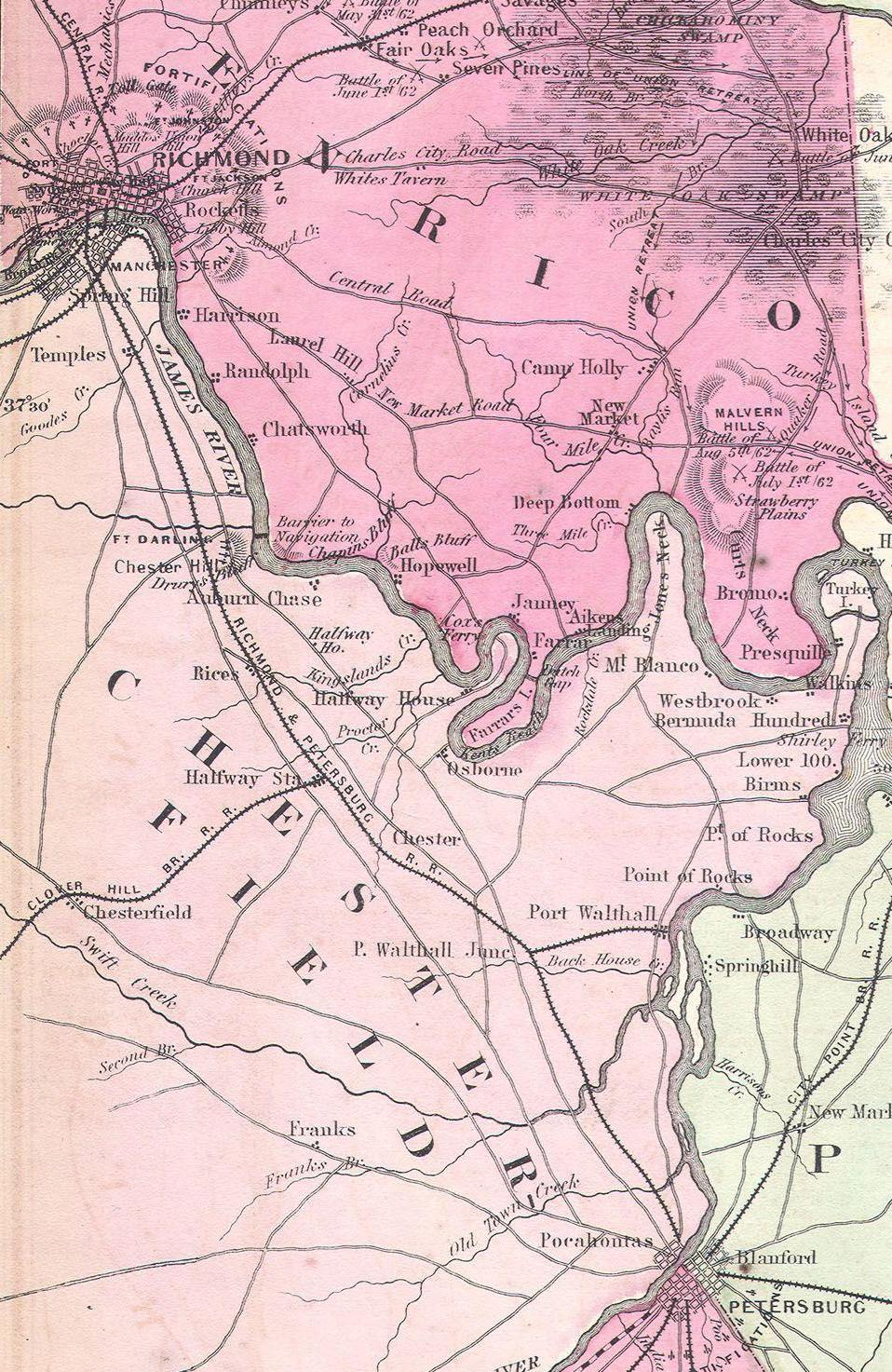
During the Civil War, the Confederacy was generally able to keep the Union troops west of the Richmond and Petersburg Railroad, with the main exception being the Bermuda Hundred campaign of 1864.

In March 1864, Ulysses S. Grant was summoned from the Western Theater, promoted to lieutenant general, and given command of all Union armies. Grant devised a coordinated strategy that would strike at the heart of Confederacy from multiple directions: Grant, George G. Meade, and Butler against Robert E. Lee near Richmond; Franz Sigel in the Shenandoah Valley; William Tecumseh Sherman to invade Georgia, defeat Joseph E. Johnston, and capture Atlanta; George Crook and William W. Averell to operate against railroad supply lines in West Virginia; Nathaniel Banks to capture Mobile, Alabama. This was the first time the Union armies would have a coordinated offensive strategy across multiple theaters.

Grant and Meade attacked Lee's Army of Northern Virginia directly in the Overland Campaign. Butler's mission was to deploy his 33,000-man army via the James River to the Virginia Peninsula and strike northwest to Richmond. The objective was not to capture the Confederate capital directly, but to cut the Richmond and Petersburg Railroad—a critical Southern supply line—and force Lee to send reinforcements to that front, weakening him against Grant and Meade.

Butler was one of several "political generals" in the war – selected for his political support of Abraham Lincoln rather than his skill on the battlefield. His military career contained more controversies than victories. Grant hoped to compensate for Butler's weaknesses by assigning him two strong subordinate generals: Quincy A. Gillmore, commanding the X Corps, and William F. "Baldy" Smith, commanding the XVIII Corps, but neither proved assertive enough to counteract Butler's inexperience.

The campaign took its name from the fishing village of Bermuda Hundred on the peninsula at the confluence of the Appomattox and James rivers. The village is southeast of Richmond and northeast of Petersburg. It was downriver on the James from the practical limit of advance for Union warships, the fortifications at Drewry's Bluff.

Butler's Army of the James disembarked from navy transports at Bermuda Hundred on May 5, the same day Grant and Lee began fighting in the Battle of the Wilderness. He also dropped units at City Point, which could be used to threaten Petersburg. For a brief time, Butler attempted to move out smartly. Opposing him was a Confederate force (from the Department of North Carolina and Southern Virginia) of 18,000 under Gen. P.G.T. Beauregard; some of these soldiers were pieced together from the ranks of teenagers and elderly men in the Richmond-Petersburg area, theoretically no match for Butler's soldiers. Beauregard's subordinate commanding troops around Petersburg was George Pickett of Pickett's Charge fame.

== Battles ==
The battles fought during the Bermuda Hundred campaign were:

=== Port Walthall Junction (May 6–7, 1864) ===
On May 6, Brig. Gen. Johnson Hagood's brigade stopped initial Federal probes at Port Walthall Junction, a junction critical to controlling the railroad. On May 7, a Union division drove Hagood's and Bushrod Johnson's brigades from the depot and cut the railroad. Confederate defenders retired behind Swift Run Creek and awaited reinforcements. Soldiers of the Confederate States of America later melted down the railroad tracks leading to the port to manufacture cannons.

=== Swift Creek (May 9) ===
Butler made a thrust toward Petersburg and was met by Johnson's division at Swift Creek. A premature Confederate attack at Arrowfield Church was driven back with heavy losses, but Union forces did not follow up. After skirmishing, Butler seemed content to tear up the railroad tracks and did not press the defenders. In conjunction with the advance to Swift Creek, five Union gunboats steamed up the Appomattox River to bombard Fort Clifton, while Brig. Gen. Edward W. Hincks's U.S. Colored Troops division struggled through marshy ground from the land side. The gunboats were quickly driven off, and the infantry attack was abandoned.

=== Chester Station (May 10) ===
Elements of Maj. Gen. Robert Ransom's division conducted a reconnaissance-in-force against a portion of Butler's army that was destroying the railroad at Chester Station. The Confederates attacked near the Winfree House, and the Federals retired to their Bermuda Hundred entrenchments.

=== Proctor's Creek (May 12–16) ===
Butler moved north against the Confederate line at Drewry's Bluff but again adopted a defensive posture when his attack was not supported by gunboats. On May 13, a Union column struck the right flank of the Confederate line at the Wooldridge House, carrying a line of works. Butler remained cautious, however, giving Beauregard time to concentrate his forces. At dawn on May 16, Ransom's division opened an attack on Butler's right flank, routing many units. Subsequent attacks lost direction in the fog, but the Federals were disorganized and demoralized. After severe fighting, Butler extricated his army from battle, withdrawing again to his Bermuda Hundred line. Butler's offensive against Richmond was effectively ended.

=== Ware Bottom Church (May 20) ===
Confederate forces under Beauregard attacked Butler's line near Ware Bottom Church. About 10,000 troops were involved in this action. After driving back Butler's advanced pickets, the Confederates constructed the Howlett Line, effectively bottling up the Federals at Bermuda Hundred.

== Aftermath ==
Butler's expedition was an overall failure, and he was "bottled up" at Bermuda Hundred, unable to move. Although he was able to distract Confederate forces for a brief time, their victories at Proctor's Creek and Ware Bottom Church enabled Beauregard to detach strong reinforcements for Lee's army in time for the fighting at Cold Harbor.

In Grant's Personal Memoirs he described a conversation with his Chief Engineer regarding Butler's predicament:

He said that the general occupied a place between the James and Appomattox rivers which was of great strength, and where with an inferior force he could hold it for an indefinite length of time against a superior; but that he could do nothing offensively. I then asked him why Butler could not move out from his lines and push across the Richmond and Petersburg Railroad to the rear and on the south side of Richmond. He replied that it was impracticable, because the enemy had substantially the same line across the neck of land that General Butler had. He then sketched the locality, remarking that the position was like a bottle and that Butler's line of intrenchments across the neck represented the cork; that the enemy had built an equally strong line immediately in front of him across the neck; and it was therefore as if Butler was in a bottle. He was perfectly safe against an attack; but, as Barnard expressed it, the enemy had corked the bottle and with a small force could hold the cork in its place.

— Ulysses S. Grant, Personal Memoirs

Butler's forces were eventually used in the Siege of Petersburg. Bermuda Hundred was garrisoned by Federal troops throughout the siege.

== See also ==
- Francis Morrison
- Overland Campaign
- Point of Rocks
